= Tubalcain =

Tubalcain may refer to:

- Tubal-cain, biblical character associated with metalworking
- Tubalcain Alhambra, anime and manga character
- Tubal Cain mine, abandoned copper mine in Olympic National Park in the U.S. state of Washington
- Clan of Tubal Cain, a traditional witch coven formed by British neopagan Robert Cochrane
- Tubal Cain, the pen name of Tom Walshaw, a prolific British writer on model engineering
- Tubalcain, a 1990s band with Athan Maroulis as a member
