= Six-column beam engine =

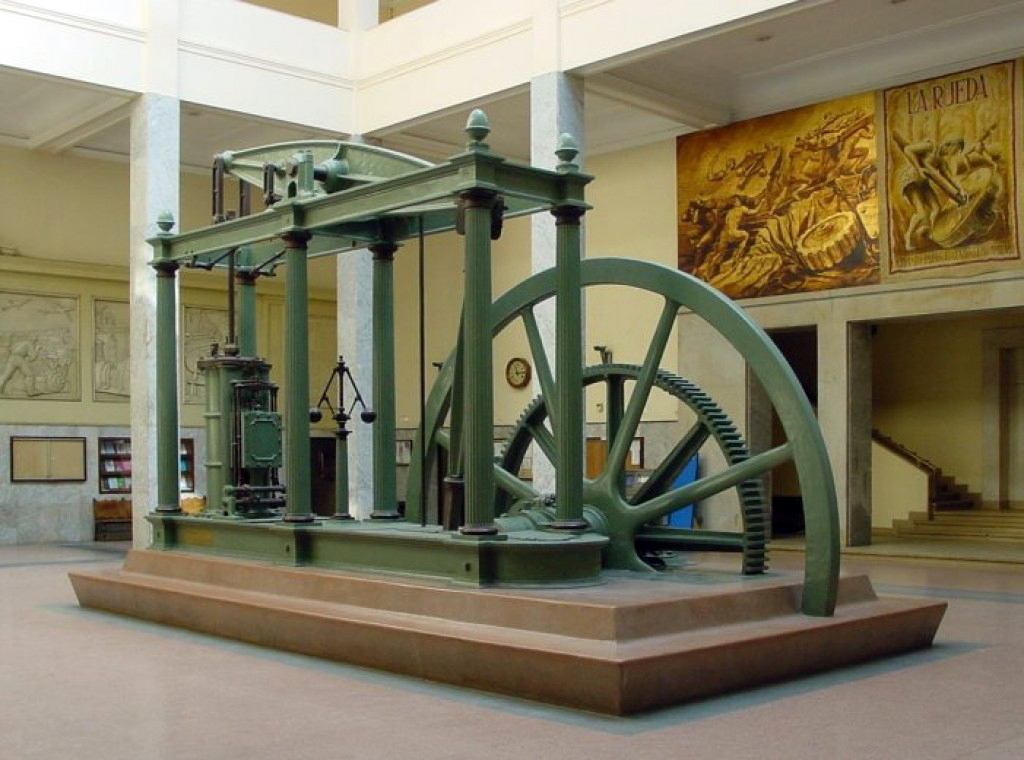
Six-column engine by Napier of London (1859). One of the first beam engines in Spain, it drove coining presses at the Royal Spanish Mint until the end of the 19th century. Now preserved at the Universidad Politécnica de Madrid

Six-column beam engines are a type of beam engine, where the beam's central pivot is supported on a cast-iron frame or 'bedstead', supported on six iron columns.

== History ==
These engines were a development after the house-built engine. Their cast-iron frames could be built and test-assembled at a factory before delivery, allowing rapid assembly or 'erection' once on site. Their main advantage was that they avoided the need for complex masonry foundations in their engine house, merely a simple level platform to which the iron frame could be bolted. The difficult alignment between their cylinder, the beam pivot and the crankshaft was all taken care of by the factory-made frame. Although the upper part of the frame only supports the beam's central pivot and any Watt's parallel motion gear, it also has an important function in stiffening the frame overall against vertical bending forces between the cylinder and crankshaft. Cast iron is weak against bending, and a shallow frame alone would need either rigid masonry support, or would soon fracture.

One of the oldest surviving six-column engines is a small engine of 1820, possibly by Boulton & Watt, preserved at the Birmingham Museum of Science and Industry. Another six-column engine was within that collection, an Easton & Amos engine of 1864. This engine is rather larger and a Woolf compound.

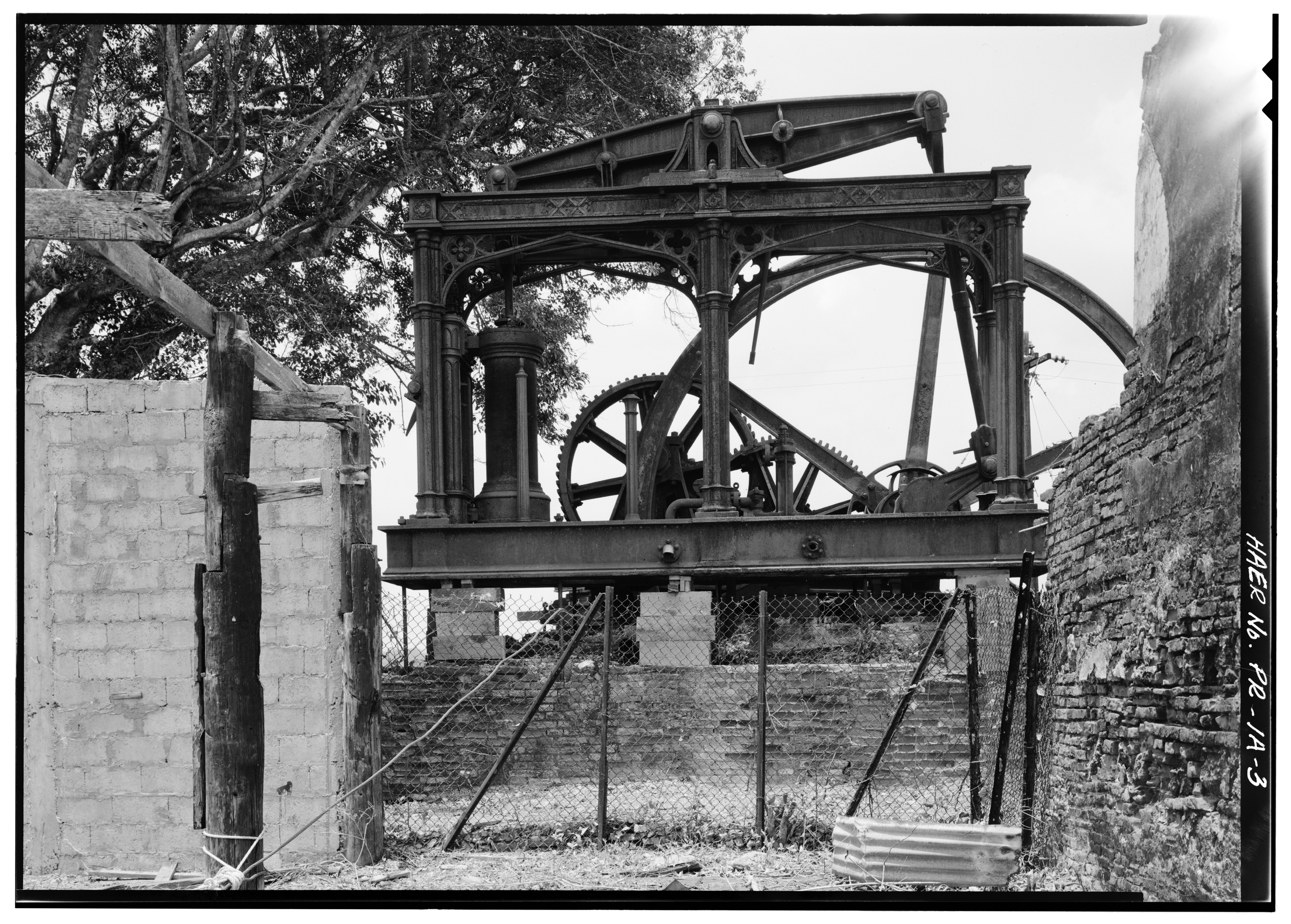
Hacienda La Esperanza engine

Six-column engines were most popular for the smaller sizes of engine. They were all rotative beam engines, with a flywheel and rotating output shaft. These were used to drive machinery, as diverse as sugar cane crushing mills, winding engines in coal mines and sawmills. Many beam engines, working into the late 20th century, (Note: The six pumping engines of the Severn Tunnel at Sudbrook were only replaced in 1962.) were non-rotative and drove vertical water pumps directly. These did not use the six column layout.

The small six-column engine may be considered as an early form of semi-portable engine. Its pre-fabricated nature and avoidance of foundations made it quicker, thus cheaper, to first install. It also encouraged the re-use of engines on other sites. The small Birmingham engine is known to have worked on at least three different sites as a winding engine, grinding fireclay and finally as a farm chaff cutter, a working life of around 130 years. The Cobb's Brewery engine (1825) at Margate was one of a batch built for a sugar plantation in the West Indies, but owing to their bankruptcy before shipping it was sent instead to South America. Its ship then foundered on the North Foreland and it was purchased from the wreck for use locally. The versatility of this design meant that they could be used easily by a variety of industries.

Six-column engines were not usually built outside the UK, although at least one was built by the US West Point Foundry in the 1840s and exported to the Hacienda Azucarera La Esperanza in Puerto Rico, to drive a sugar cane mill. It remains there today and in 1979 was designated as a National Historic Mechanical Engineering Landmark by the American Society of Mechanical Engineers.

== Variations ==
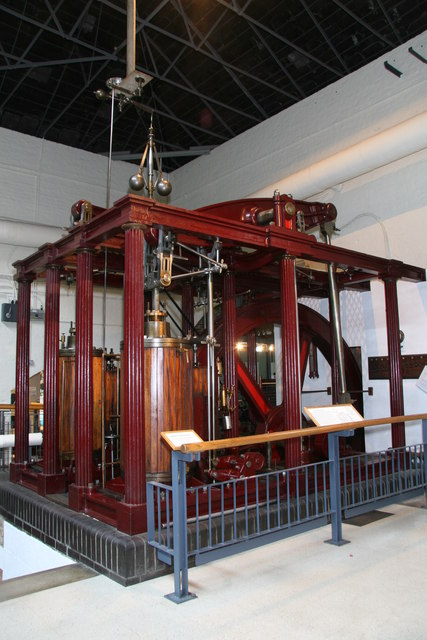
Dancers End twin six-column engine

The twin six-column engine was used where two engines drove a shared flywheel. Typical cast-iron six-column frames were used over each engine, but joined by additional frames between them. An example of such an 1867 Kay & Co. engine from Dancers End pumping station in the Chiltern Hills is now at Kew Bridge

Larger engines rarely used the six-column form, as the upper framework would become unwieldy. The weight of their large beams was more than the slim columns supporting the beam pivot could cope with. A rare form was the eight-column engine, where the pivot was supported by four close-set pillars rather than two. An example of such an engine survives at Markfield Road. With the extra power of the largest engines, the bending forces on the frame would become too much altogether and these engines used either masonry beds, or a deep iron bed casting, set at the base of the engine.

== Tank-bed engines ==
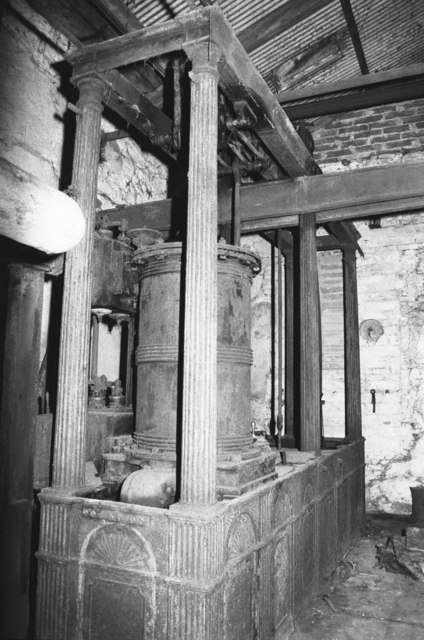
Tank-bed engine at Middleton Distillery

A further development as a semi-portable engine was the tank-bed engine. This replaced the flat lower frame with a deep, cast-iron 'bath tub'. This improved the rigidity of the frame, such that the engines could be placed on the very weakest foundations. Many of these engines, in colonial use, were merely staked down to timber baulks, rather than being built onto masonry.

Most beam engines were also condensing. Fittings such as the hot well and air pump could be conveniently placed within such a water-tight tank, so that their efflux water was contained.

A model of a tank-bed engine was the basis of Tubal Cain's model beam engine design, Lady Stephanie.
