= Cialitos River =

River of Puerto Rico

Coordinates: 18.3443951°N 66.4690599°W

- Native name: Río Cialitos (Spanish)

Location
- Commonwealth: Puerto Rico
- Municipality: Ciales

Physical characteristics
- Source
  - location: Tres Picachos in Toro Negro, Ciales
- Mouth
  - location: Manatí River at Ciales Pueblo

Basin features
- Tributaries
  - left: Barbas River
- Waterfalls: La Escalera, Las Delicias

The Cialitos River (Spanish: Río Cialitos) is a tributary of the Manatí River (Río Grande de Manatí) that flows through the municipality of Ciales, Puerto Rico. Its headwaters are located in the northward slopes of Los Tres Picachos massif of the Cordillera Central, from where it flows towards the Northern Karst belt of Puerto Rico, where it meets the Manatí River by Ciales Pueblo.

== Cialitos River Nature Reserve ==
The Cialitos River Nature Reserve (Reserva Natural Río Cialitos) was established in 1999 to protect the forested tracts along the stretch of the river that represents an ecological corridor between the Cordillera Central and the Northern Karst of Puerto Rico. In addition to its ecological value, this area also represents a geological transition stage between the volcanogenic Cordillera Central and the karst zone. The heterogeneous nature of the area is reflected in its high biodiversity, with endemic species such as the Puerto Rican sharp-shinned hawk. The headwaters of the Cialitos River are also protected as part of the Los Tres Picachos State Forest.

== See also ==
- List of rivers of Puerto Rico
