= Barbas River =

River of Puerto Rico

Coordinates: 18.2968971°N 66.5218387°W

- Native name: Río Barbas (Spanish)

Location
- Commonwealth: Puerto Rico
- Municipality: Ciales

Physical characteristics
- Source
  - location: Cordillera Central in Cialitos, Ciales
- Mouth
  - location: Cialitos River in Cialitos, Ciales

The Barbas River (Spanish: Río Barbas), located in the municipality of Ciales, Puerto Rico, is a tributary of the Cialitos River. The river has its source in the foothills of the Cordillera Central of barrio Cialitos and flows northward, meeting the Cialitos River at the boundaries of the Cialitos and Frontón barrios of the same municipality.

== See also ==
- List of rivers of Puerto Rico
- Cialitos River
