= Semi-portable engine =

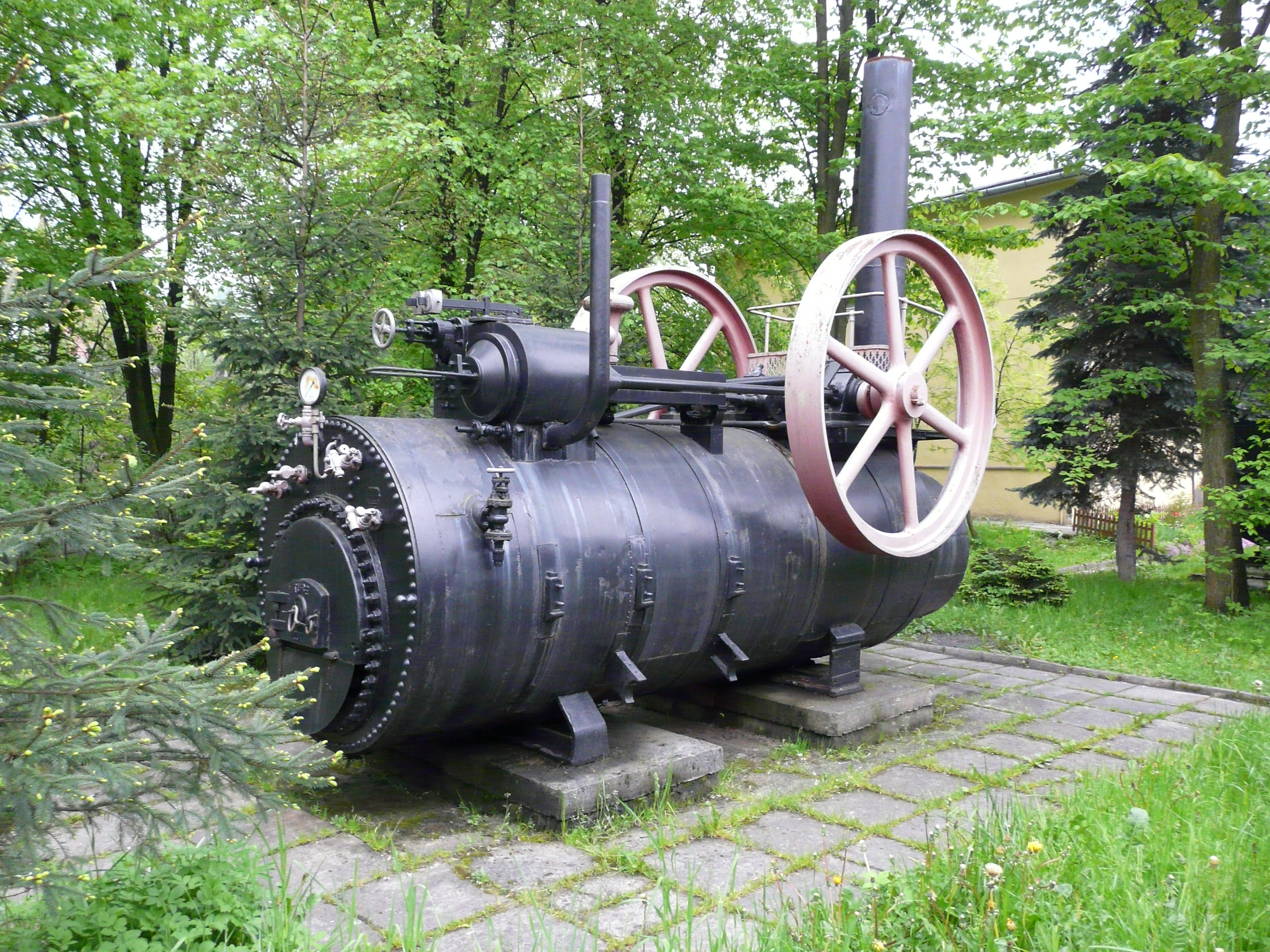
Polish semi-portable engine with launch-type boiler

A semi-portable engine is a form of stationary steam engine. They were built in a factory as a single unit including the boiler, so that they could be rapidly installed on site and brought into service.

Although the earliest examples can be dated to Richard Trevithick in around 1800, the type is best known as the products of Robey & Co. of Lincoln who patented their design in 1873. The distinctive Robey design was an undertype with one or two cylinders mounted beneath a locomotive boiler. The cylinders were mounted beneath the smokebox and a transverse crankshaft ran crossways beneath the boiler, just ahead of the firebox. The frame of these engines was a large iron box casting that formed a single piece foundation for both the engine and boiler.

Owing to the small height available with this pre-fabricated foundation, the semi-portable engine had no large flywheel, as was standard practice for stationary engines. The need for a more even power delivery, without the smoothing effect of a flywheel, encouraged the use of twin cylinder engines, even though a larger single cylinder would be cheaper and equally powerful. Where a flywheel was supplied, this was smaller than usual and would still require a pit digging in which to site it. During factory testing, the engine bed would have to be raised on timber baulks to provide this extra height.

A typical large stationary engine of this time used a number of lancashire boilers, set in brickwork surrounds. These took a considerable time to build their masonry, let alone install the equipment. The vertical cross-tube boilers used for small portable machinery such as steam cranes had much less steam generation capacity and could only run at full power intermittently. Locomotive boilers though, as used here, had greater capacity and could provide a mechanical plant that could run continuously for long periods. Robey also built some examples, around 1886, with launch-type boilers.

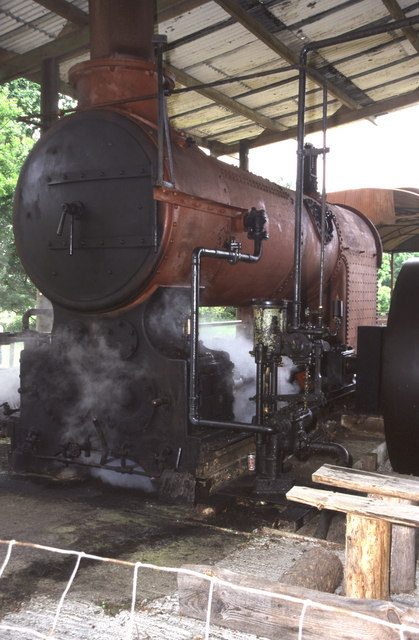
Marshall undertype engine

Where engines were to be shipped overseas, the ancillary equipment, spare parts etc. were packed into riveted iron sheet boxes. On installation, these boxes could be re-used as water tanks.

== Applications ==
Many of these semi-portable engines were used for large civil engineering and mining projects, driving water pumps, air compressors, drilling and piling machinery. Some specialised engines were also built with drums for winding in mine shafts, especially when exploratory shafts were being sunk. If a mine was successful and went into production, a full engine house could be built later.

== See also ==
- House-built engine
- Six-column beam engine
