= José Ramon Fernández (businessman) =

Puerto Rican sugar baron

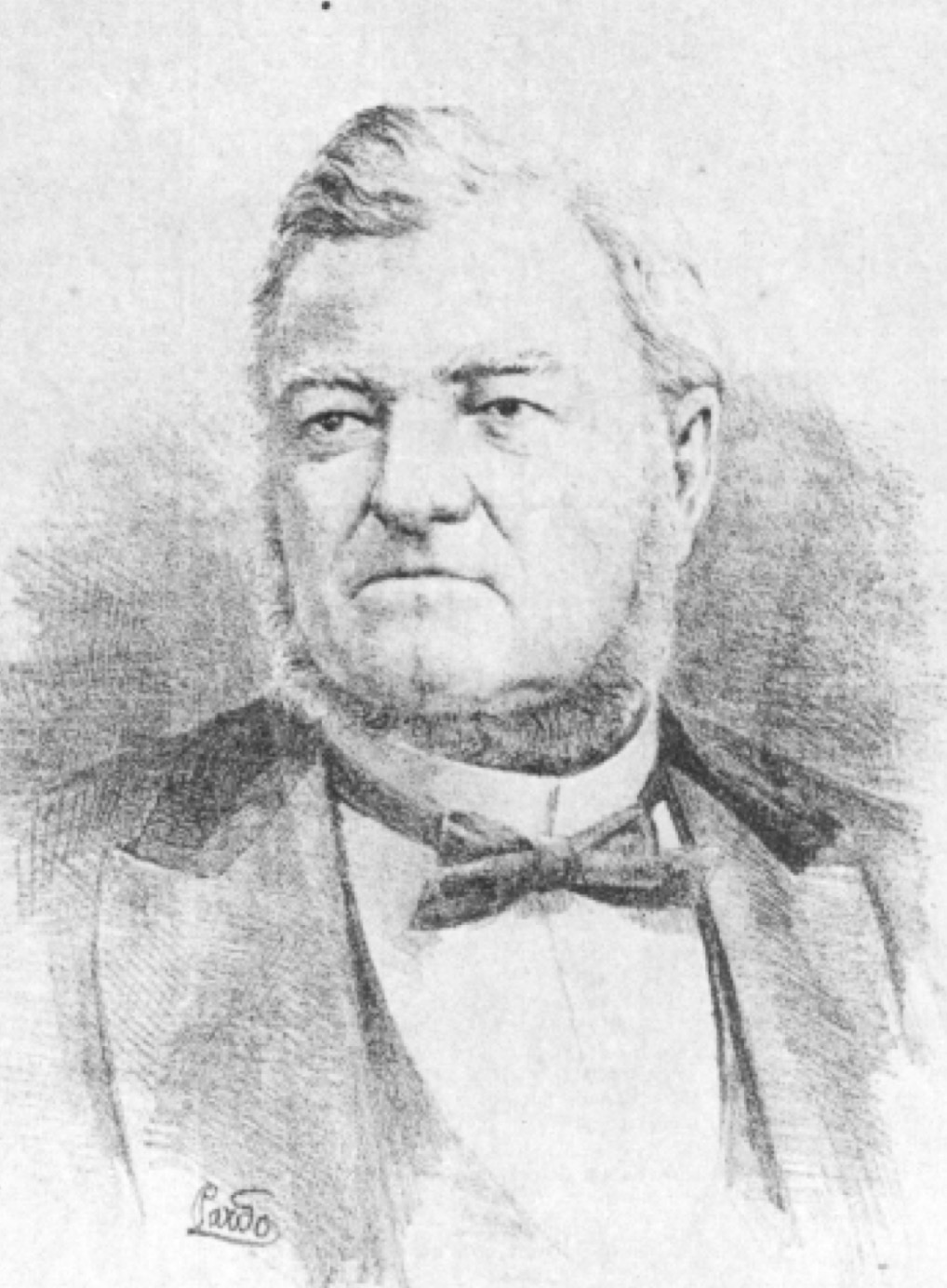
- José Ramon Fernández "Marqués de La Esperanza"
- Born: 22 December 1804; San Juan, Puerto Rico
- Died: 1883 (aged 78–79); Manatí, Puerto Rico
- Occupation: Sugar baron

Notes
- The Spanish Crown bestowed upon him the title of Marquis of La Esperanza (Spanish: Marqués de La Esperanza)

José Ramon Fernández, 1st Marquis of La Esperanza (1808–1883), was the wealthiest sugar baron in Puerto Rico in the 19th century. He was also one of the most powerful men of the entire Spanish Caribbean. He owned an immense plantation of nearly 2300 acres on the northern coast of Puerto Rico, and a sugar mill with an advanced steam engine. His wealth and political connections gave him the power to convince the Spanish Colonial government in the island to split the municipality of Manati in two, and thus found the municipality of Barceloneta.

The Hacienda La Esperanza steam engine has been designated a National Historic Mechanical Engineering Landmark. Today the entire property is owned by the Puerto Rico Conservation Trust, which preserves and protects it, including some of the only coastal forest left in the region.

== Early years ==
Fernández (birth name: José Ramon Fernández y Martínez) was one of three siblings born to Fernando Fernández and Francisca Martínez in San Juan, Puerto Rico. Fernández's father was a Spanish naval captain from Castile who fought against pirates and English merchant ships. In 1797, the Spanish Crown granted him large plots of land in the towns of Bayamon and Manati in recognition of his service to Spain.

In Bayamon he planted sugar cane and raised cattle. He named the property the "Santa Ana Plantation". Like other planters, he depended on imported African slaves for labor on the plantations. In 1804, the senior Fernández used a mixture of sugar and honey to process and distill rum. He aged his product in special barrels imported from Europe. The rum he produced was only for his own personal use and that of his family and friends, and he served it with pleasure.

Fernández received his primary education in Puerto Rico. In 1819 when he was eleven years old, his father sent him to Spain for schooling and to study business. When he was seventeen, the young Fernández went to England to continue his education, where he became fluent in the English language. He went to the United States in his early twenties and continued his education in New York City. There he befriended various businessmen who in the future would help him in his commercial endeavors.

== Return to Puerto Rico ==
Fernández returned to Puerto Rico in 1826 and helped his father to administer La Esperanza sugar plantation. He met and befriended George C. Latimer, the United States consul in San Juan. Together with Latimer, who was also a sugar broker, he founded Latimer & Fernández Co. The company, which was located in San Juan, was a distributor of sugar, molasses and rum, and also dealt with other commodities such as food and textiles.

In 1827, Fernández ordered his 127 slaves to build an enormous windmill shaped like a tower. The windmill helped to extract the juice from the sugar canes. He still used manpower whenever the wind wasn't strong enough for to operate the windmill. The senior Fernández did the same with his other plantation in Manati, which he named Hacienda La Esperanza.

According to Puerto Rican historian Federico Ribes Tovar, there were many instances when rival tribes in Africa would kidnap royal members of another tribe and sell them to slave traders. This was the case of one of Fernández's slave in 1832. He noticed that the slave in question received special treatment from his other slaves. When he found out about the slave's royal lineage, he sent him back to Africa.

Fernández married Clemencia Dorado y Serrano. They had four daughters, the youngest of whom died young. Their later marriages reflected the family's international connections: one daughter, Barbara, married the nephew of American George Latimer; another daughter married an Englishman.

In 1834, Fernández decided to concentrate on his commercial interests instead of the agricultural ones. He established a warehouse in the town of Mayaguez on the west coast, where he moved with his family. It was for shipping to the Caribbean and Latin America.

== Political life ==
Fernández became president of the "Partido Incondicional Español" (Unconditional Spanish Party), a conservative political party in Puerto Rico. He was appointed to several political positions. Because of his political views and status, he was in good political standing with Queen Isabella II of Spain and the Spanish-appointed government of the island; he favored the monarchy and the Spanish colonial government.

He became involved with various businesses. In 1850, used his political influence to lobby for the establishment of a railroad line between San Juan and Arecibo, with the financial backing of Augusto de Cottes and Cornelio Kortwright. The improved transportation would help planters get their commodities to market.

== Marqués de La Esperanza ==
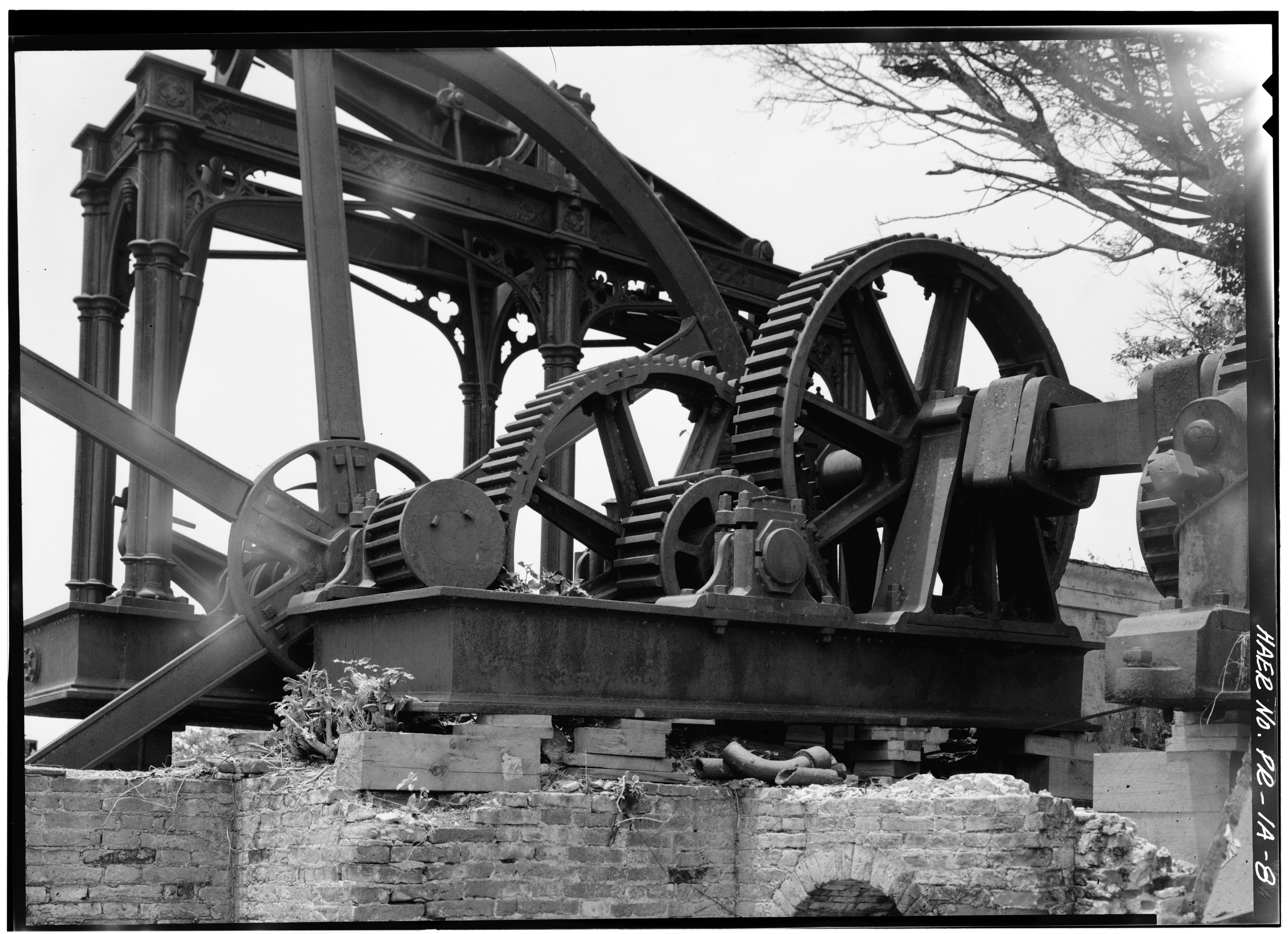
Hacienda La Esperanza's steam engine and mill. It was designated a National Historic Mechanical Engineering Landmark by the American Society of Mechanical Engineers in 1979.

An 1868 uprising against the monarchs of Spain forced Queen Isabella II to go into exile in September of that year. This revolt, which deposed the queen, is known as the Glorious Revolution. It ushered the First Spanish Republic into power. After much deliberation, the new government replaced Isabella with Amadeo I, son of the Italian king.

The new provisional government allowed its colonies to send representatives to the Spanish Court. Fernández was among those who represented Puerto Rico. On February 5, 1869, the Spanish government bestowed the title of "Marqués de La Esperanza" (Marquis of Hope, related to the name of his plantation) upon Fernández.

When his father died, Fernández inherited La Esperanza, which at the time was one of the largest and the most technically advanced sugar plantations in Puerto Rico. "La Esperanza" was situated on 2,265 acres of land rich in alluvial deposits, an important element for the cultivation of sugar cane. By 1880, he controlled 80 percent of the valley. Fernández built the wealth of his plantation on the labor of ethnic African slaves who provided the manpower to cultivate and harvest the sugar cane on the plantation and to run the factory and mill. By the time of emancipation in 1873, Fernández owned 175 slaves.

In the 1840s, he and his father had installed an advanced steam engine with two-flue boiler, purchased from the West Point Foundry of New York. Designated in 1979 as a National Historic Mechanical Engineering Landmark, the steam engine is the

"only West Point Foundry beam engine known to survive. It is also the only known 6-column beam engine by any American manufacturer. Additionally, it is one of only eight beam engines of American manufacture known to exist anywhere."

The system includes an elaboration (Jamaican) train, conveyor belt, and four evaporators for processing of sugar cane.

In a demonstration of his political influence, Fernández convinced the government to divide the municipality of Manati in two and found the new municipality of Barceloneta. This was clearly for his own economic benefit. If he used the port of Manati, Fernández would have to pay taxes for the movement of goods and slaves. In Barceloneta, he built his own port and was able to ship his commodities and products free of taxes.

== Legacy ==
Fernández incurred many debts because of the money which he borrowed to mechanize his plantation. He was unable to pay his debts. When he died, his family became involved in a feud as to who was the rightful inheritor of the plantation. As two of the daughters had married foreigners (Barbara married George Latimer's son, William F. Latimer. Maria Teresa married Edward Savage), the third, Clemencia, said she was the only rightful heir. As Fernandez' major creditor, the Colonial Company Ltd. claimed ownership of the land.

In 1975, the Puerto Rico Conservation Trust acquired the Hacienda La Esperanza. La Esperanza is one of the most valuable assets of the Trust. The land includes varied terrain of karst, wetlands, forest, including some of the only coastal forest on the north coast, and river valley. In 1984 the conservation trust began work on the restoration of the plantation structures.

=== Rum ===
Another of Fernando Fernández' sons inherited the property at Bayamon. His line has kept some of the property. Based on a son's education in France and learning about cognac aged in oak barrels, the family made changes to their rum-making process. In 1915, they started producing Ron del Barrilito (literally, rum from the little barrel) for commercial sales. Fernández descendants still produce this local brand of Puerto Rican rum at Bayamon.

== See also ==
- Fernando Fernández
- List of Puerto Ricans
