= Tom Walshaw =

English mechanical engineer and author (1912–1998)

Tom D. Walshaw
- Born: 1912; North Lincolnshire, England
- Died: May 1998 (aged 85–86)
- Other name: Tubal Cain
- Occupations: Mechanical engineer, author, model engineer
- Known for: Author of model engineering books, founder of Tubal Cain workshops
- Notable work: The Model Engineer's Workshop Manual, The Complete Workshop Manual

Tom D. Walshaw (1912–1998) was a mechanical engineer and author born in North Lincolnshire, England. He contributed to the British magazines Model Engineer and Engineering in Miniature.

Many of his magazine contributions and books were authored under the pseudonym Tubal Cain. The pseudonym relates to the Tubal-cain, the biblical metal worker. These were mainly divided between workshop equipment articles and model stationary engine constructional articles.

== Life and education ==
He graduated in mechanical engineering at Loughborough University in 1934. After his career in mechanical design, he went back to Loughborough University in 1943, becoming a senior lecturer in mechanical engineering. He went on in 1948 to teach at University of Liverpool.

In 1952, he was appointed Head of Department of Mechanical, Civil and Electrical Engineering at Darlington College of Technology. His final academic post was Head of Mechanical, Production and Civil Engineering at Lancashire Polytechnic. He gained his first model engineering exhibition awards in 1949.

By 1971, he made over 424 contributions to Model Engineer under Tubal Cain.

He became an editor of the Transactions of the Newcomen Society. Walshaw died on 2 May 1998.

== Model stationary steam engine designs ==
Among his most notable contributions to Model Engineer were constructional series detailing models of steam engines dating from the Industrial Revolution:

- A Vertical Columnar Engine. A model of the "Williamson" engine (serialised in 1976)
- Mary, a four-column beam engine (serialised in 1977)
- Lady Stephanie, six-column tank-bed beam engine
- Georgina, a 19th-century overcrank engine (serialised in 1980–81)
- Boreas, a Crowther-type blast furnace blowing engine (serialised in 1983–84)
- Princess Royal & Goliath: variants on mid-19th century mill engines (serialised in 1984–86)
- Trevithick's Dredger Engine (serialised in 1987–88)

== Books published ==
Walshaw published the following under his own name:

- Diesel engine design. London: George Newnes, 1949 (448 p). 2nd ed: 1953 (440 p).
- Ornamental Turning. Hemel Hempstead, UK: Argus Books, 1990 (208 p).
- The I.S.O. System of Units. Special Interest Model Books, Swanley, Kent, UK, 1991.

Walshaw published the following under the name 'Tubal Cain':

- Building the beam engine Mary. Watford, UK: Model & Allied Publications, Argus Books, 1981 (83 p).
- Building the Overcrank Engine "Georgina".
- Building the Williamson engine. Watford, UK: Argus Books, 1981 (85p).
- Model engineers handbook. Watford, UK: Model & Allied Publications, 1981 (170 p). 2nd ed: 1986. 3rd ed: 1996.
- Hardening, tempering and heat treatment. Workshop practice series no. 1. Hemel Hempstead UK: Argus Books, 1984, (124 p).
- Milling operations in the lathe. Workshop practice series no. 5. London: Argus Books, 1984 (125 p).
- Soldering and Brazing. Workshop practice series no. 9. Hemel Hempstead UK: Argus Books, 1985 (136 p).
- Drills, Taps and Dies. Workshop practice series no. 12. Swanley, England: Nexus Special Interests, 1987 (103 p).
- Workshop drawing. Workshop practice series no. 13. London: Argus Books, 1988 (110 p).
- Workholding in the lathe. Workshop practice series no. 15. London: Argus Books, 1987 (111 p).
- Simple workshop devices. Workshop practice series. Hemel Hempstead, UK: Argus Books, 1980 (127 p).
- Spring design and manufacture. Workshop practice series no. 19. Hemel Hempstead, UK: Argus Books, 1988 (95 p).
- Building simple model steam engines. Watford, UK, Model and Allied Publications, 1980 (107 p).
- Building simple model steam engines. Book 2. Hemel Hempstead, UK: Nexus Special Interests Ltd., 1998 (106 p).
