= Río Grande de Manatí =

River in Puerto Rico

Manatí River
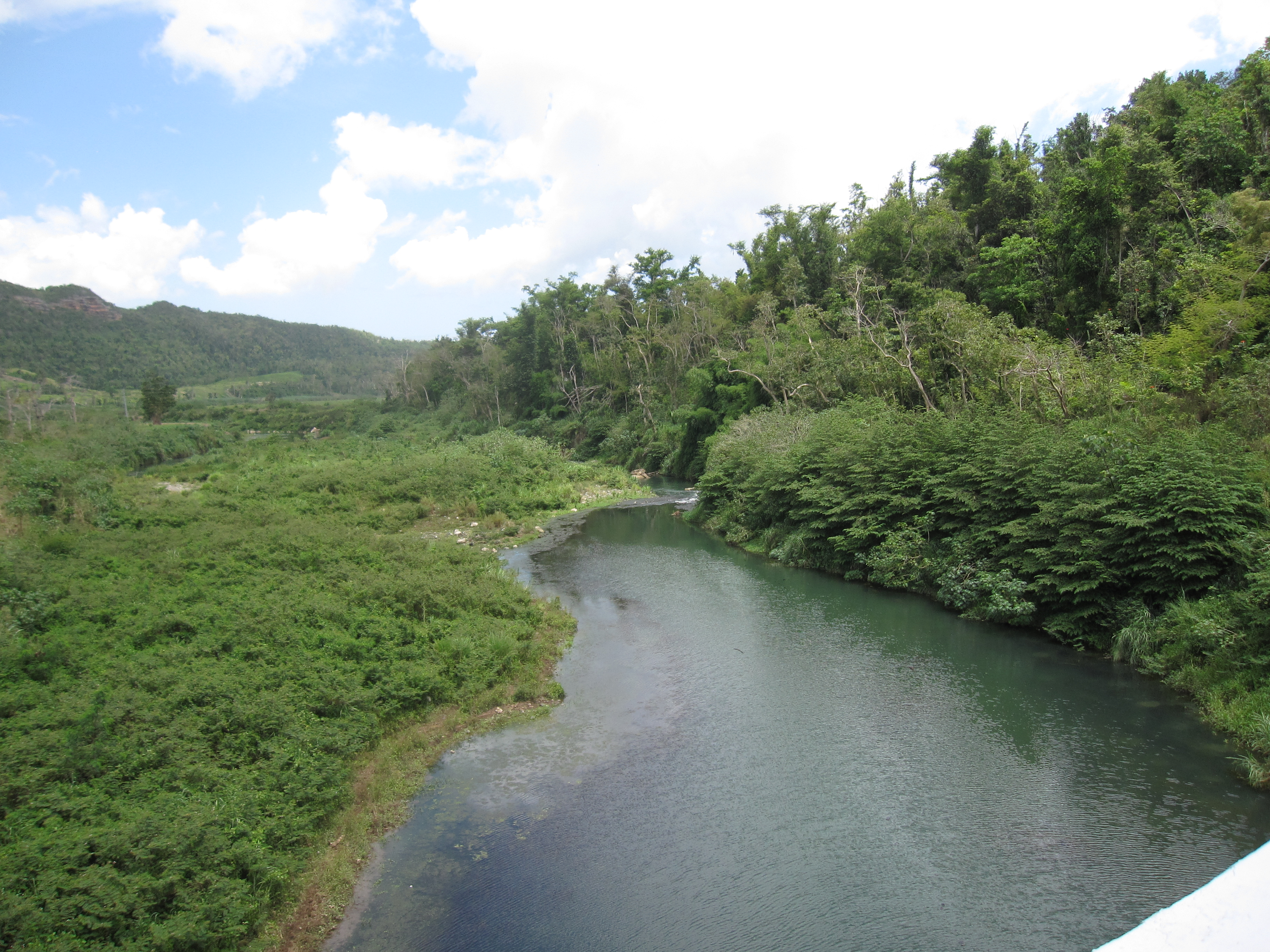
- Río Grande de Manatí from a bridge on PR-642 in Manatí

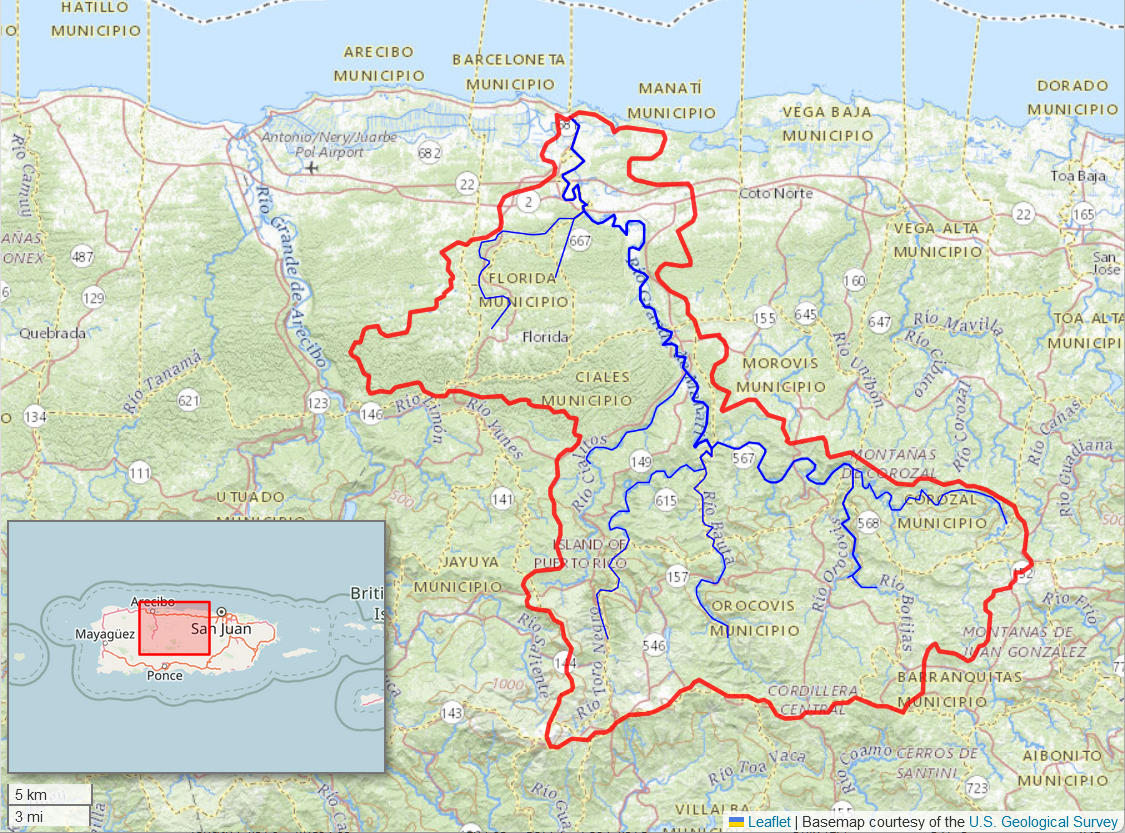
- Manatí River watershed (Interactive map)
- Etymology: Named after the municipality of Manatí, itself meaning manatee in Spanish
- Native name: Río Grande de Manatí (Spanish)

Location
- Commonwealth: Puerto Rico
- Municipality: Barranquitas, Naranjito, Corozal, Morovis, Ciales, Manatí and Barceloneta

Physical characteristics
- Source
  - location: Juan Gonzales Mountains, southeast of La Torecilla
  - coordinates: 18.200°N 66.330°W
  - elevation: 2,650 ft
- Mouth
  - location: Atlantic Ocean, northeast of Barcaloneta
  - coordinates: 18.482, -66.533
  - elevation: sea level
- Basin size: 610 km^{2} (240 mi^{2})
- Discharge
  - location: Manati Municipio, Puerto Rico (USGS gage 50037000)
  - average: 462 cu ft/s (13.1 m^{3}/s)
  - maximum: 106,000 cu ft/s (3,000 m^{3}/s)

The Manatí River (Spanish: Río Grande de Manatí) is a river in Puerto Rico, which flows through several northern municipalities of the island. The river is named after the municipality of Manatí where the river mouth is located.

== Description ==
The river travels in sequence through Barranquitas, the municipal boundaries of Orocovis, Corozal and Naranjito, Ciales, Morovis, Barceloneta and Manatí in Puerto Rico. The river flows into the Atlantic Ocean in the municipal boundary between Barceloneta and Manatí.

== History ==
In the 1898 Military Notes on Puerto Rico by the U.S. it is written that the "Manatí River is bounded on the east 'south by the Sierra Grande and on the west by the iales ridge. It rises in the Sierra Grande, and parallel with the preceding river, it flows through Siales and Manatí, to the north of which latter town it empties into the Atlantic."

The Manatí River delta, located between the municipalities of Barceloneta (where it is locally known as La Boca) and Manatí, has been protected as a wildlife refuge within the Hacienda La Esperanza Nature Reserve since the 1970s. The river, within the wider ecological region of the Caño Tiburones karstic wetlands of northern Puerto Rico, was recognized as an Important Bird Area by BirdLife International in 2007.

=== USACE project ===
In mid 2018, the United States Army Corps of Engineers announced it had earmarked $1.2 million to study flooding on the river.

== Galleries ==
=== Corozal ===
View of Río Grande de Manatí from Puerto Rico Highway 802 Bridge in Corozal.

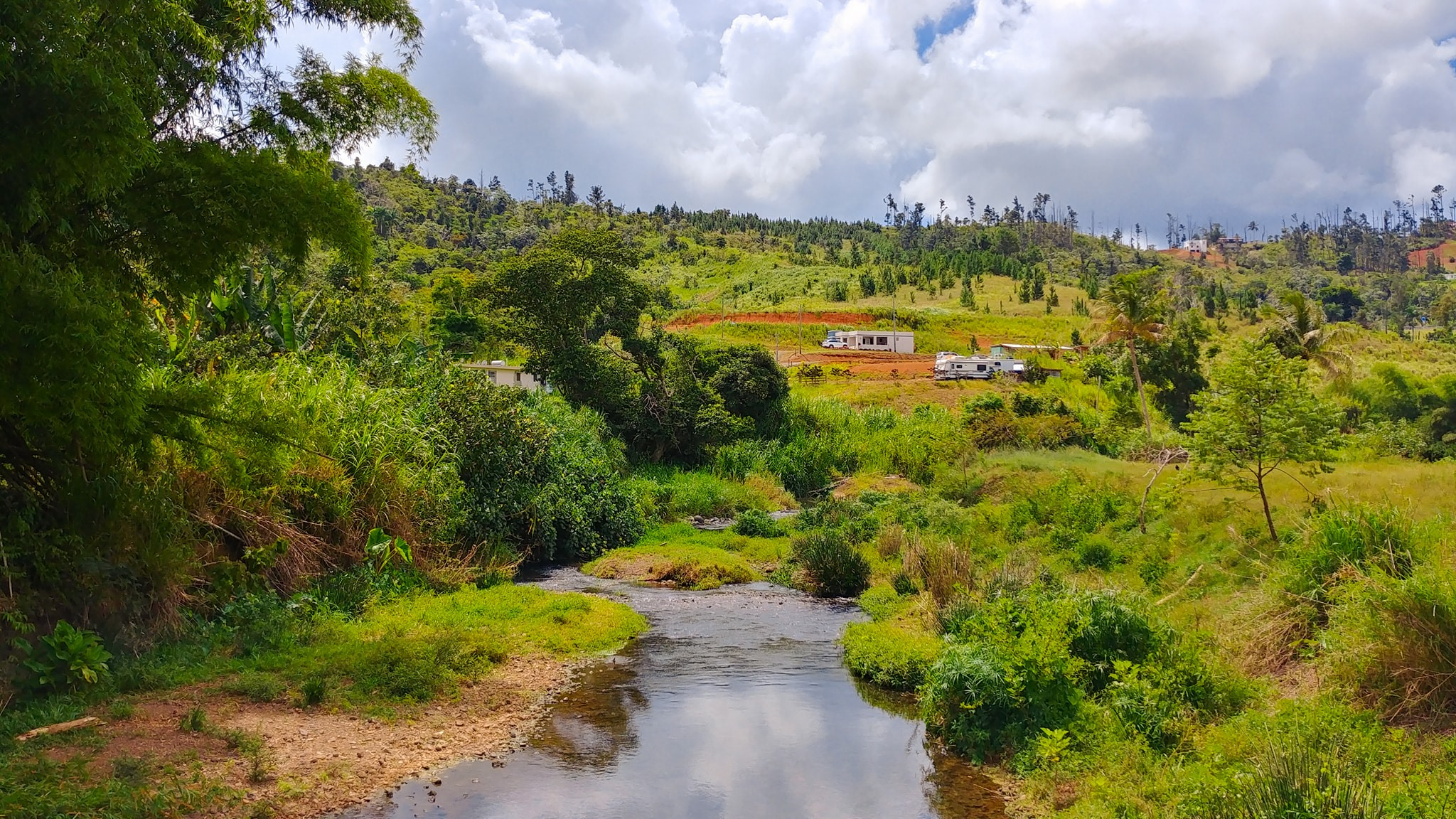

=== Morovis ===
View of Río Grande de Manatí in Río Grande barrio, near La Playita restaurant on PR-155.

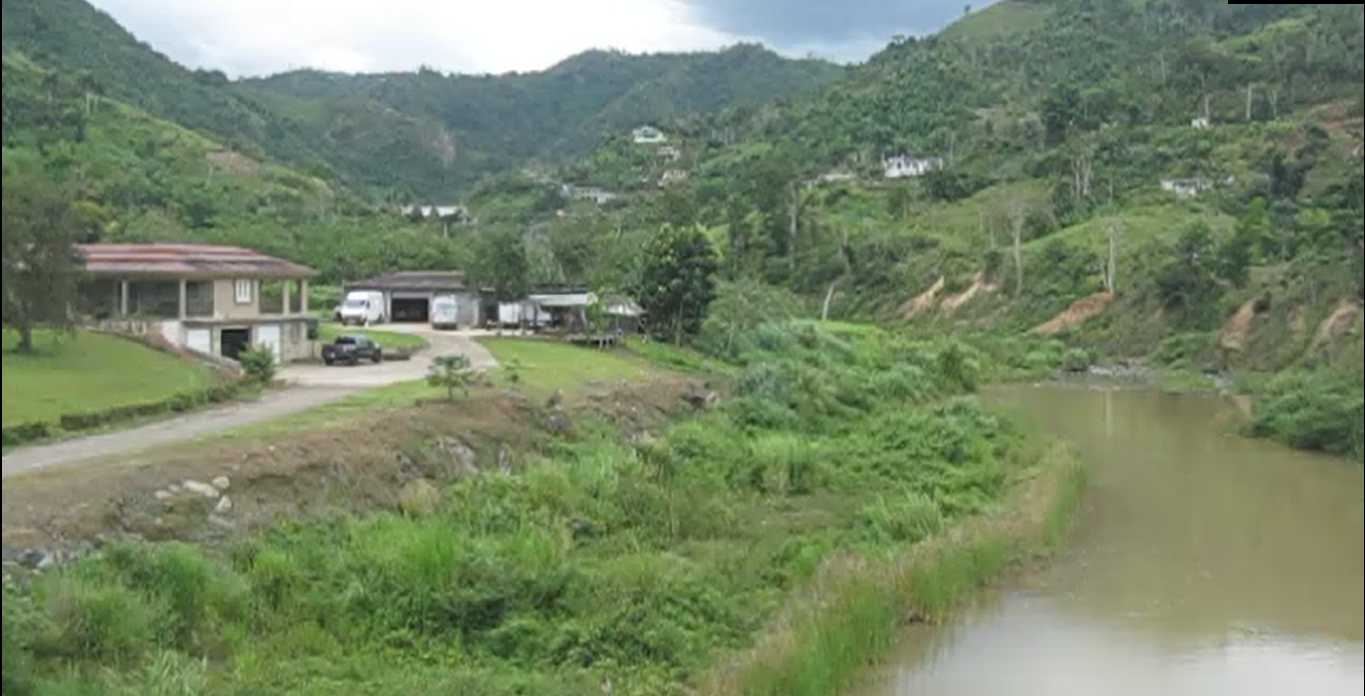

=== Ciales ===
Views of Río Grande de Manatí from historic Manatí Bridge at Mata de Plátano in Ciales.

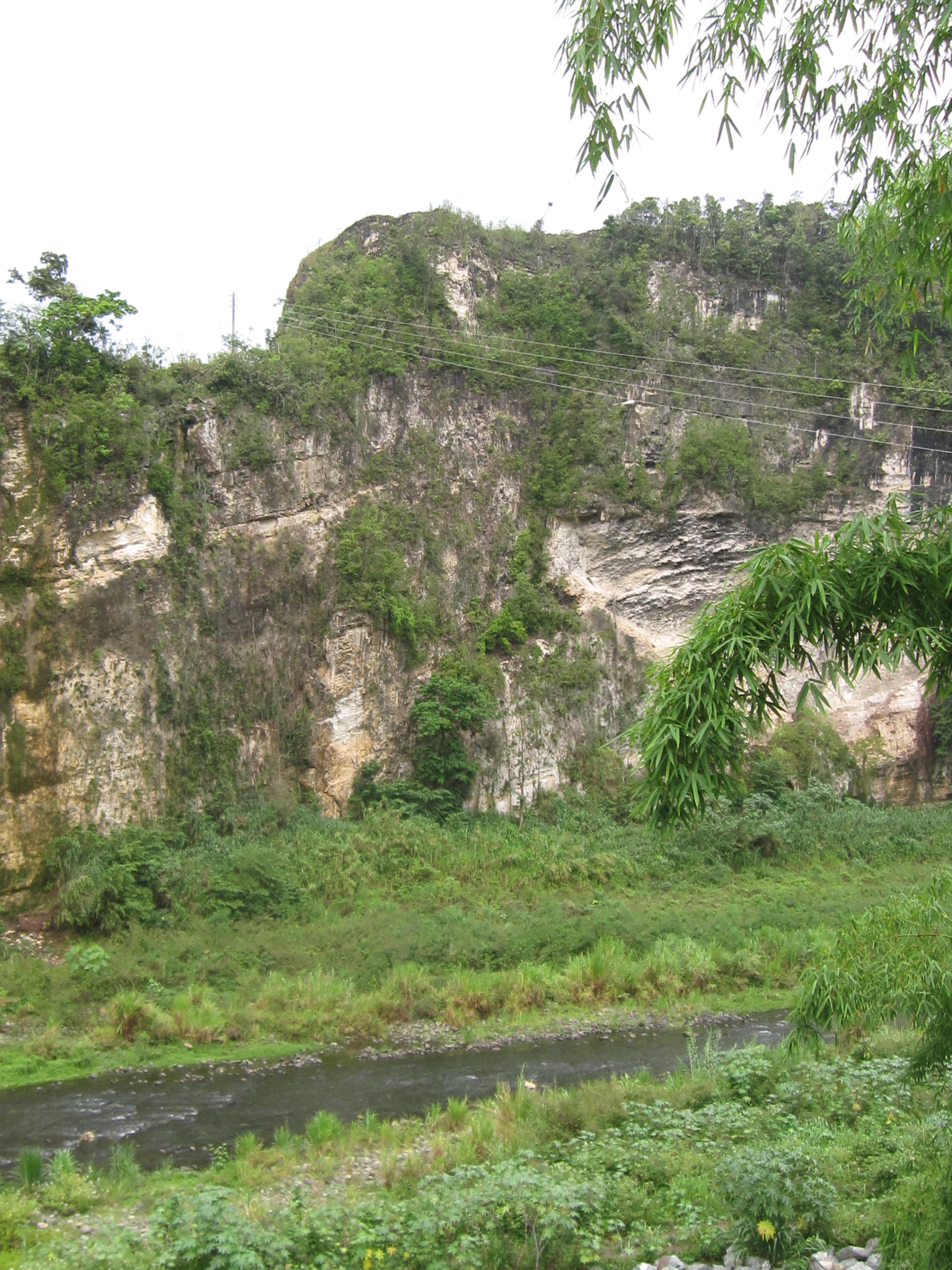

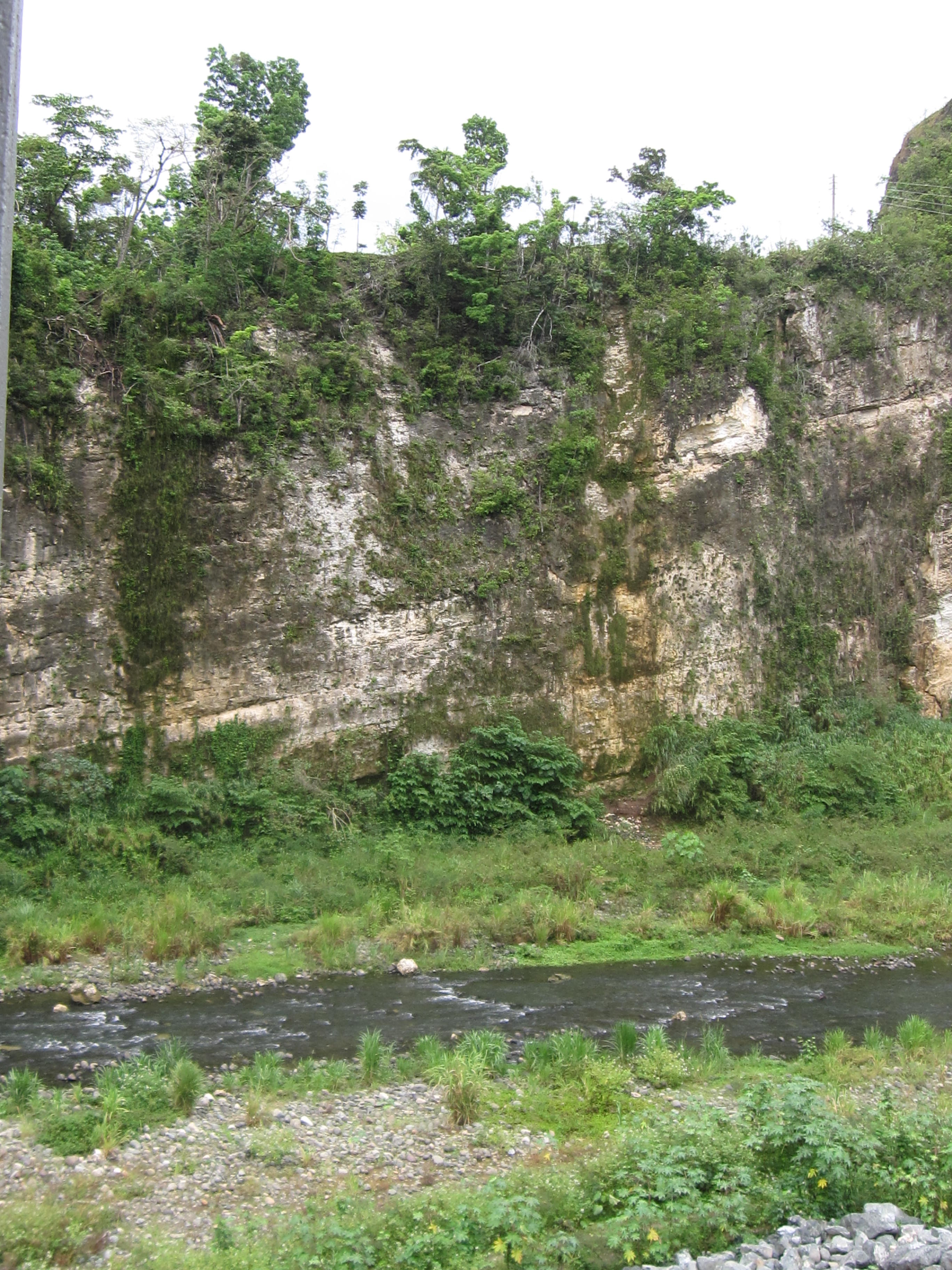

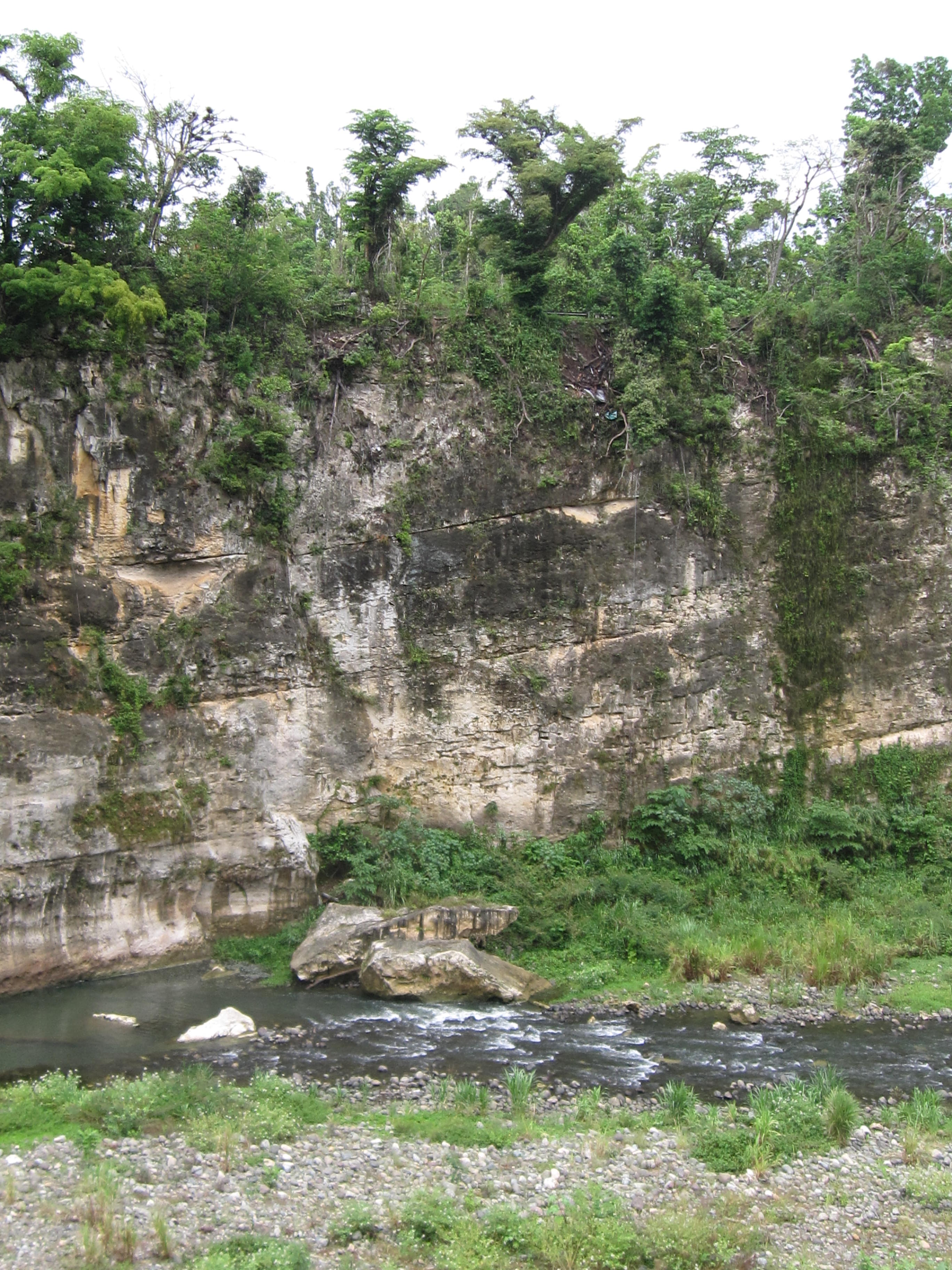

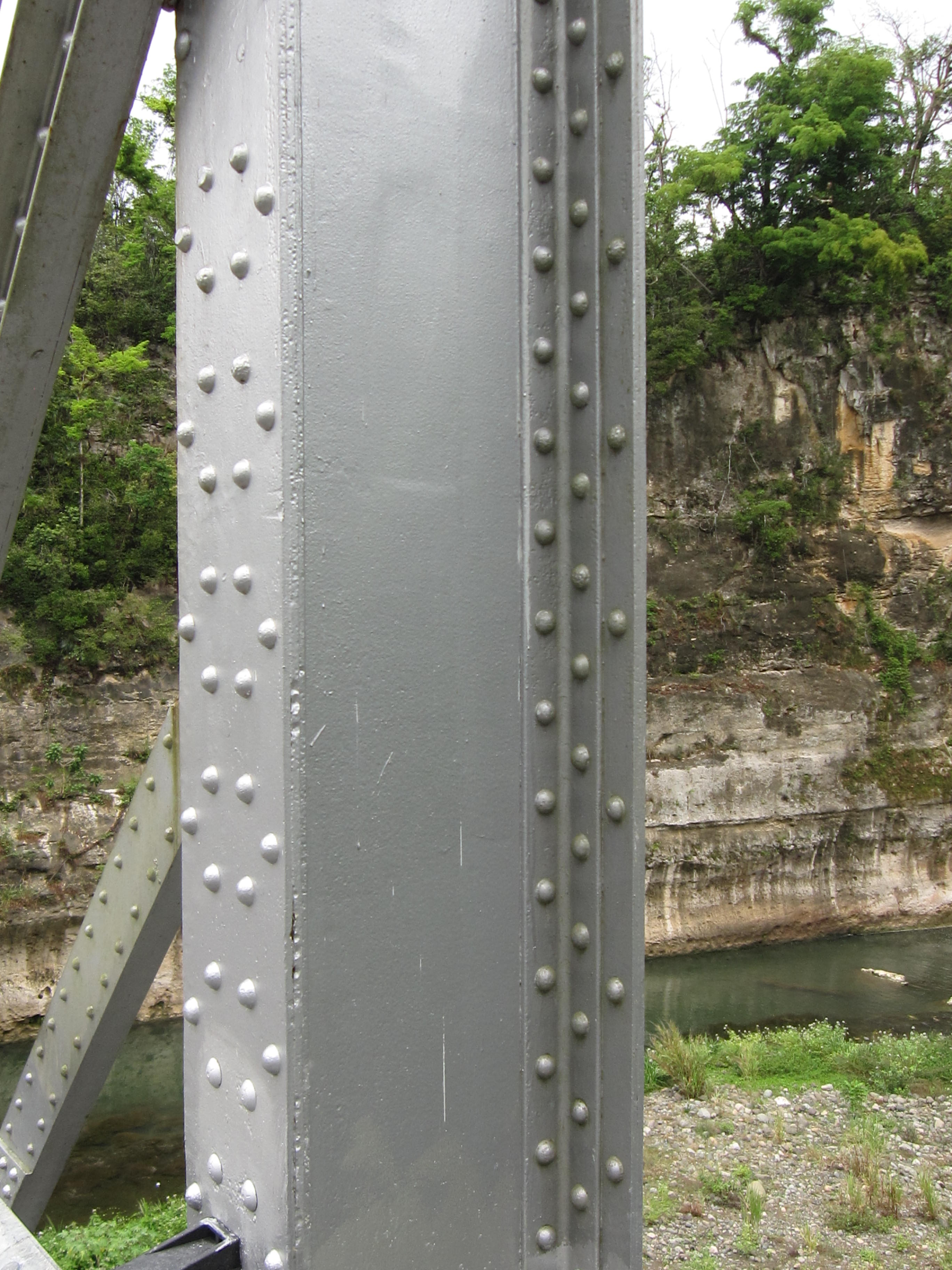

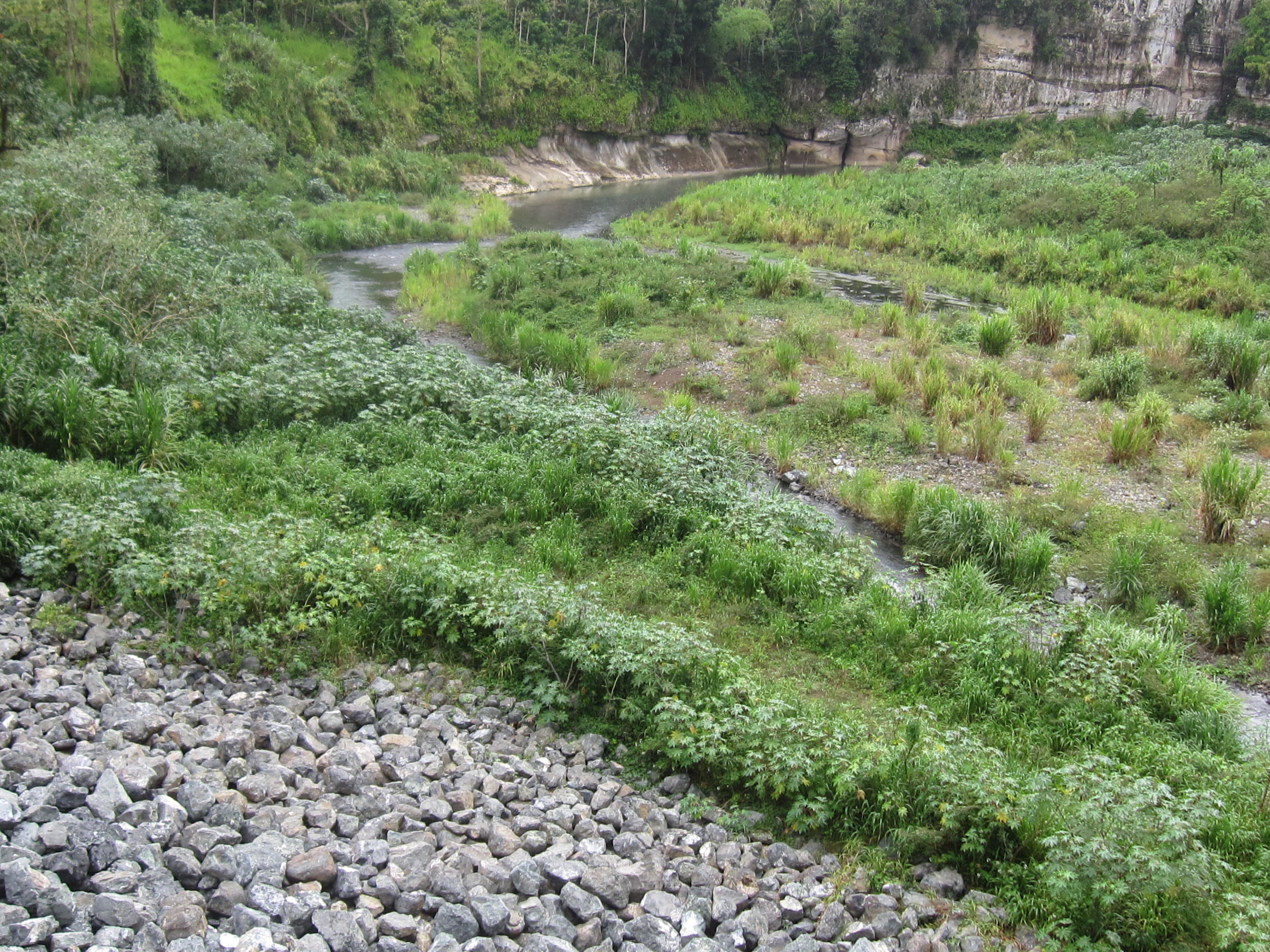

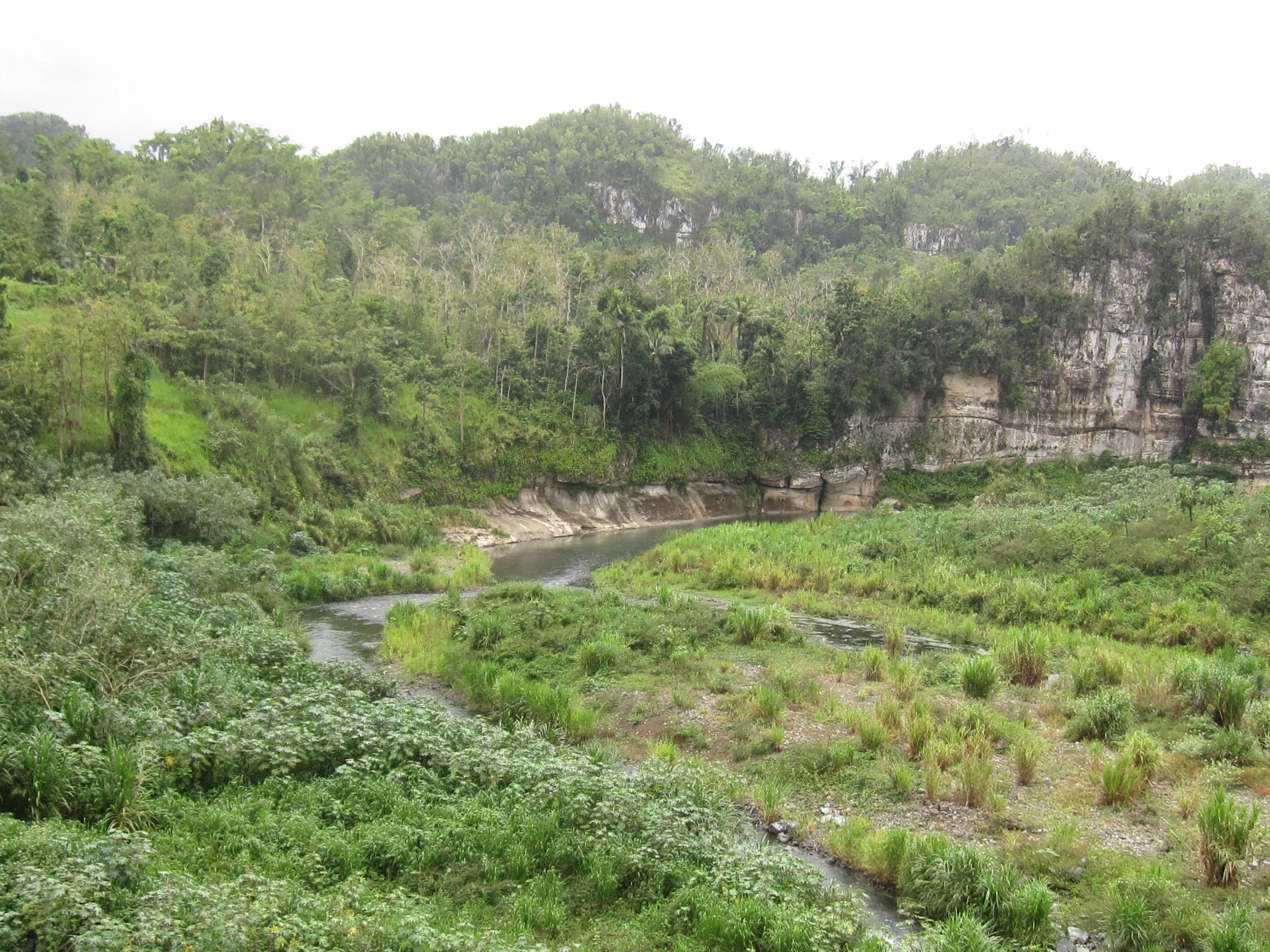

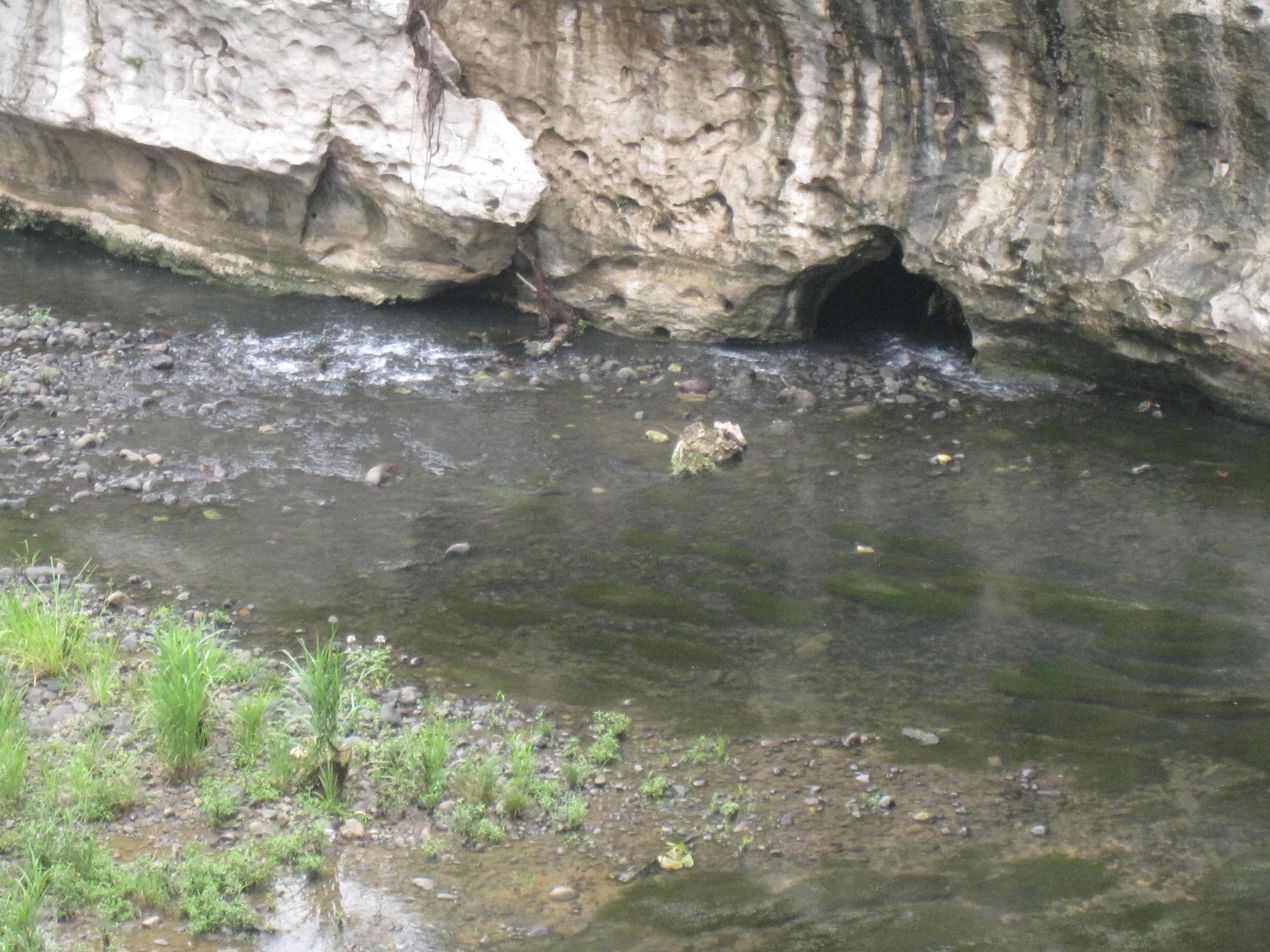

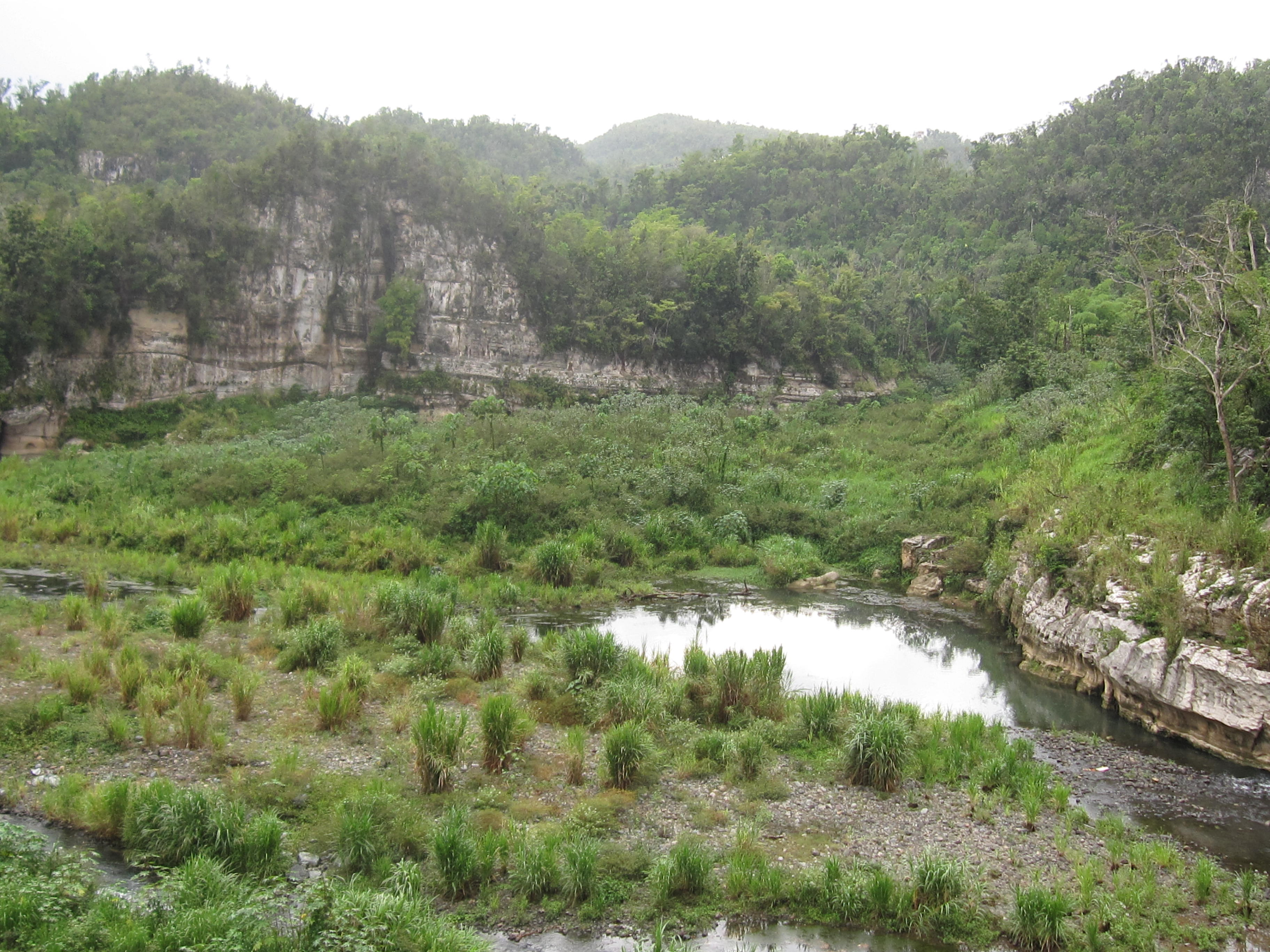

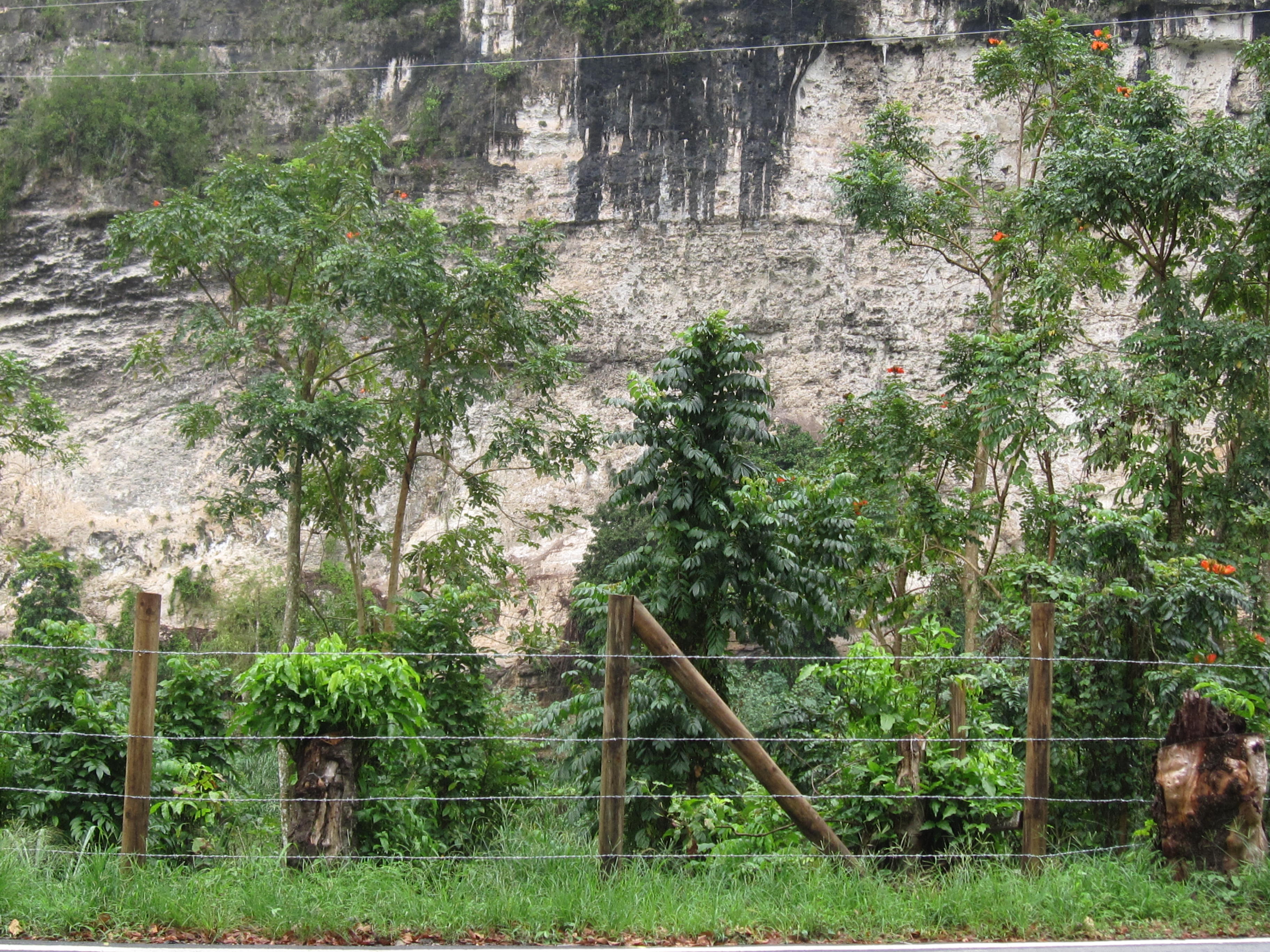

View of Río Grande de Manatí from Paseo Lineal Juan Antonio Corretjer in Ciales.

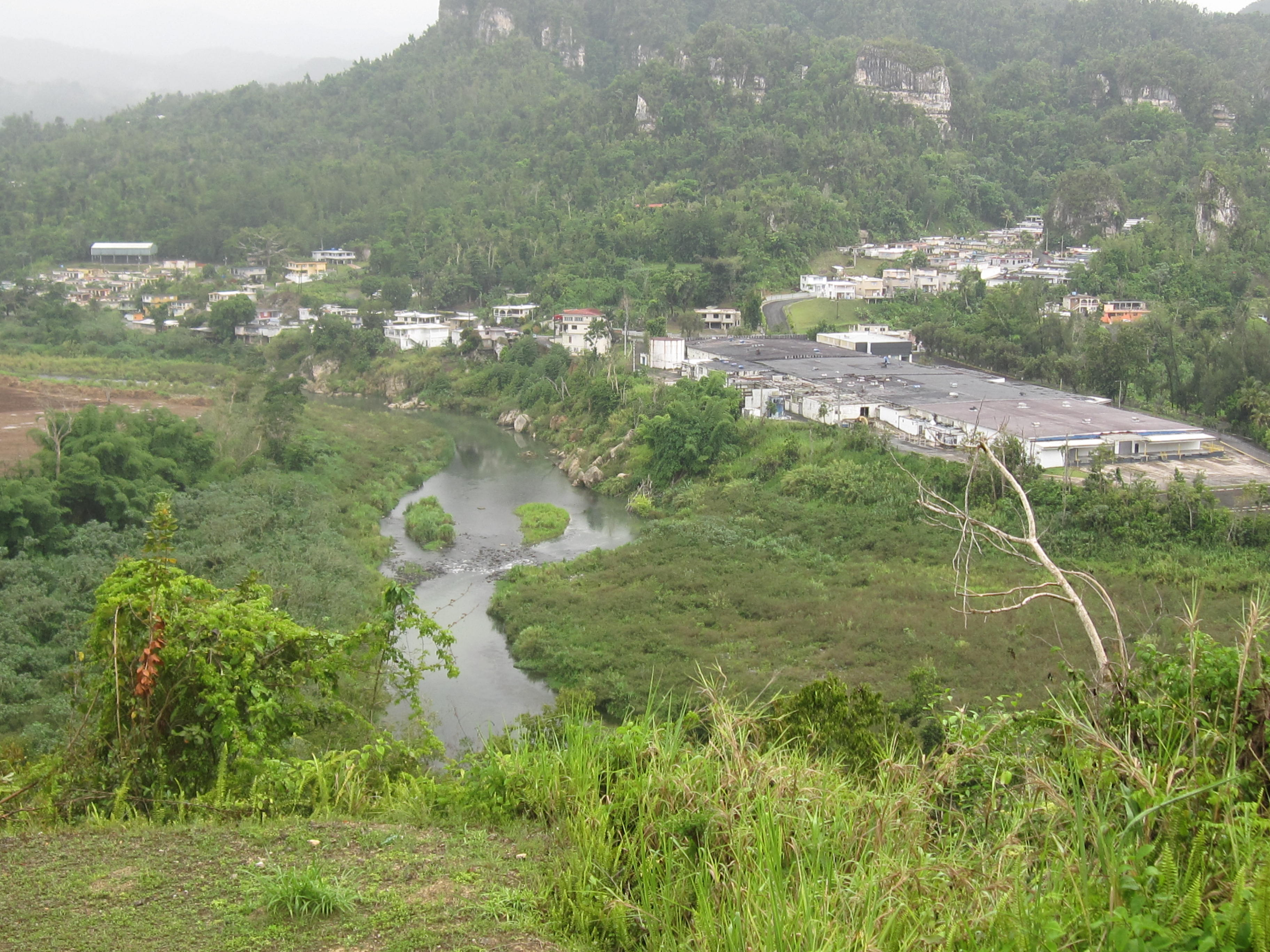

=== Manatí ===
View of Río Grande de Manatí from Puerto Rico Highway 642 Bridge in Manatí.

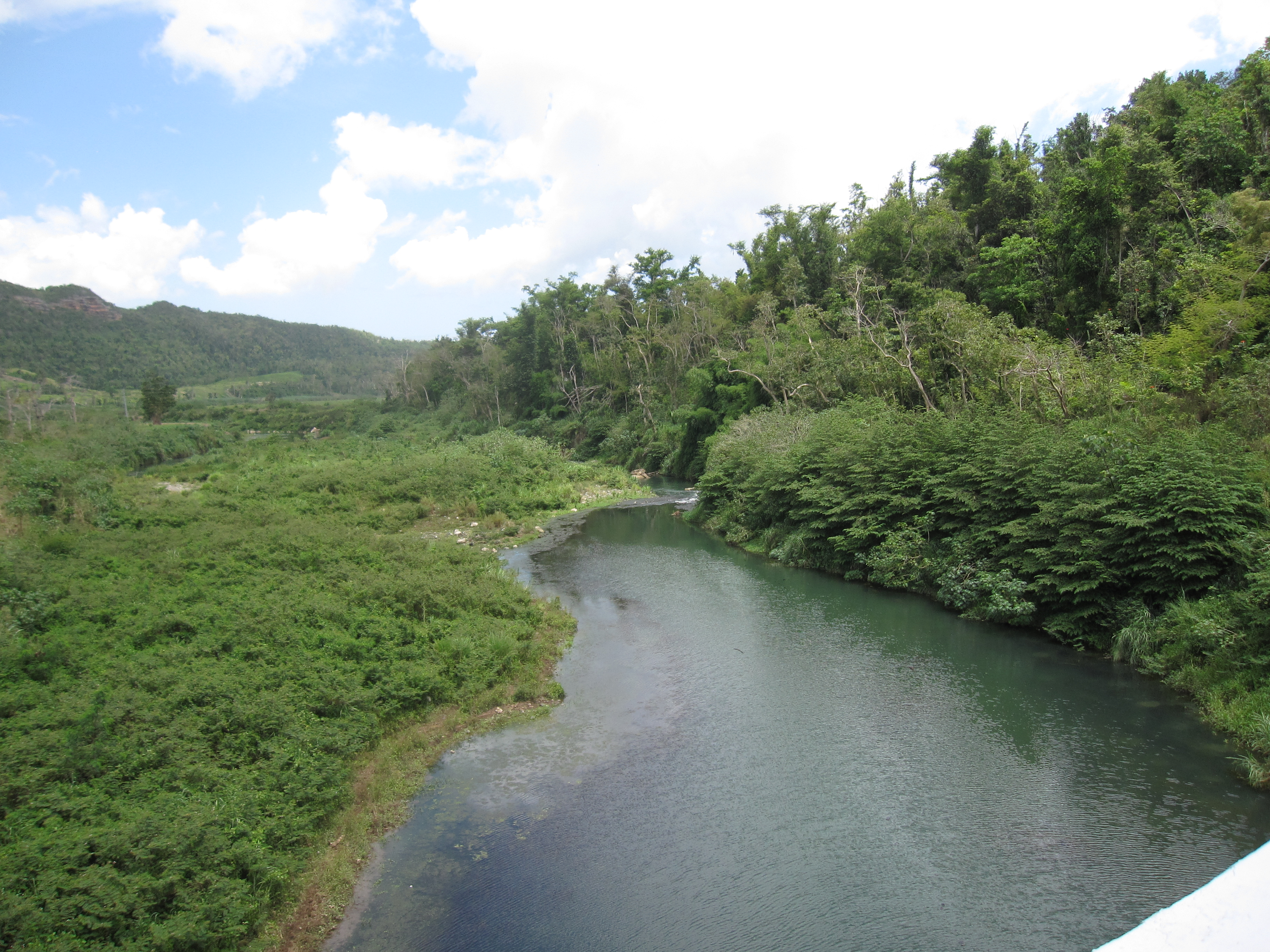

=== Barceloneta ===
View of Río Grande de Manatí in Barceloneta.

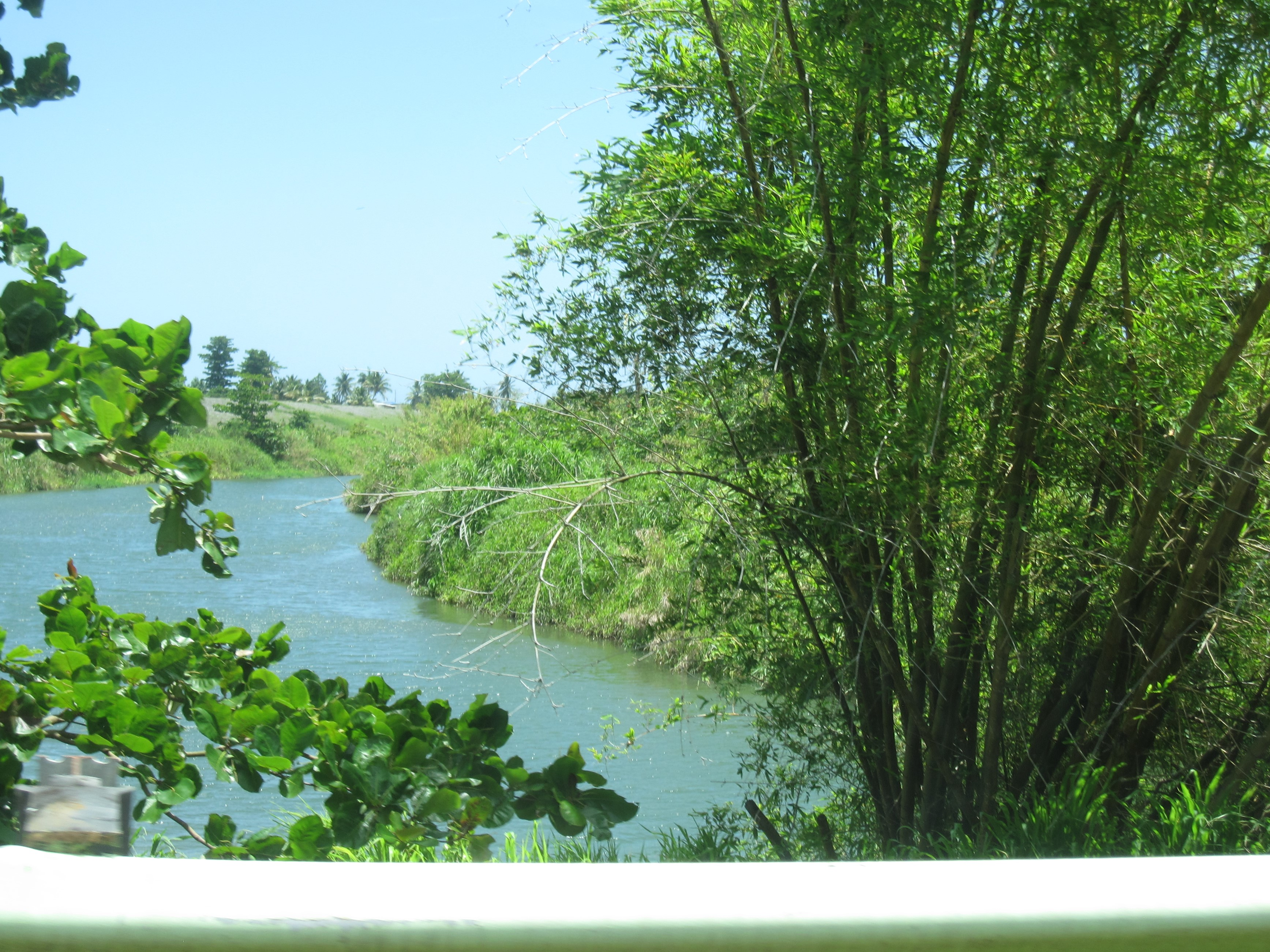

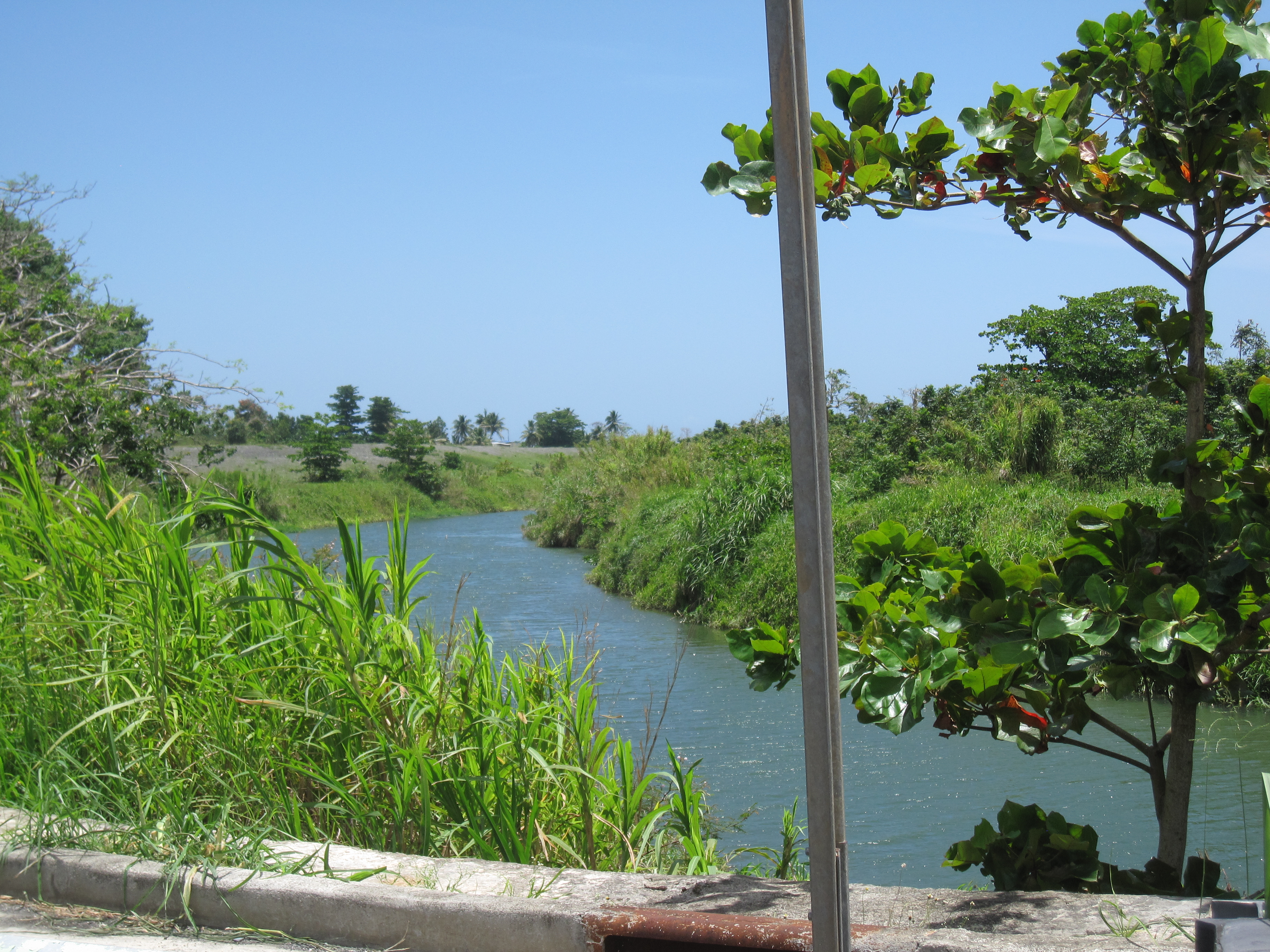

== See also ==
- Manatí Bridge at Mata de Plátano: NRHP listing in Ciales, Puerto Rico
- List of rivers of Puerto Rico
