= Toro Negro River =

River of Puerto Rico

Coordinates: 18.2952306°N 66.4596156°W

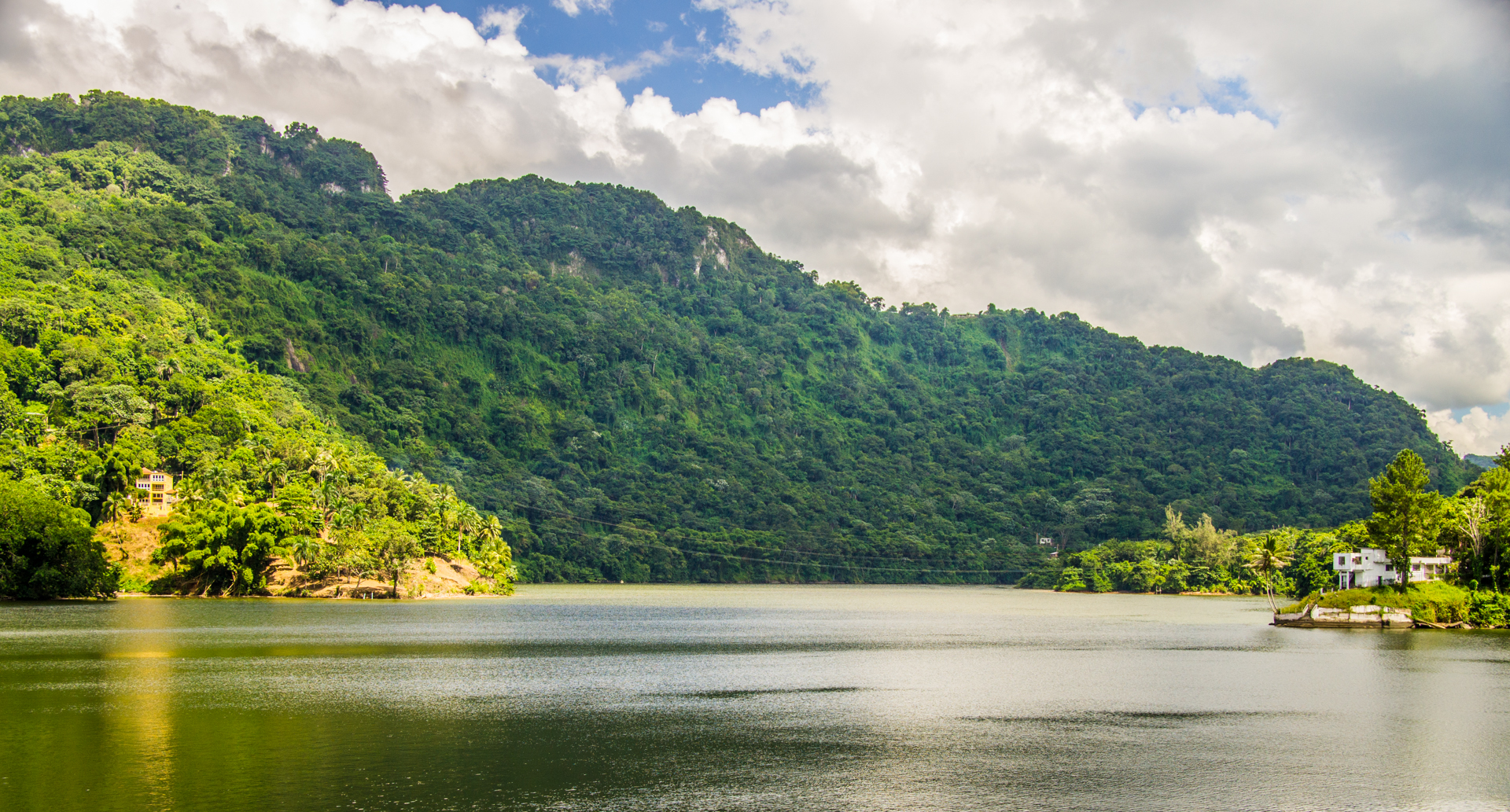
- Native name: Río Toro Negro (Spanish)

Location
- Commonwealth: Puerto Rico
- Municipality: Ciales

Physical characteristics
- Source
  - elevation: 259 ft.

The Toro Negro River (Spanish: Río Toro Negro) is a river of Ciales, Orocovis, and Jayuya in Puerto Rico.

== Gallery ==
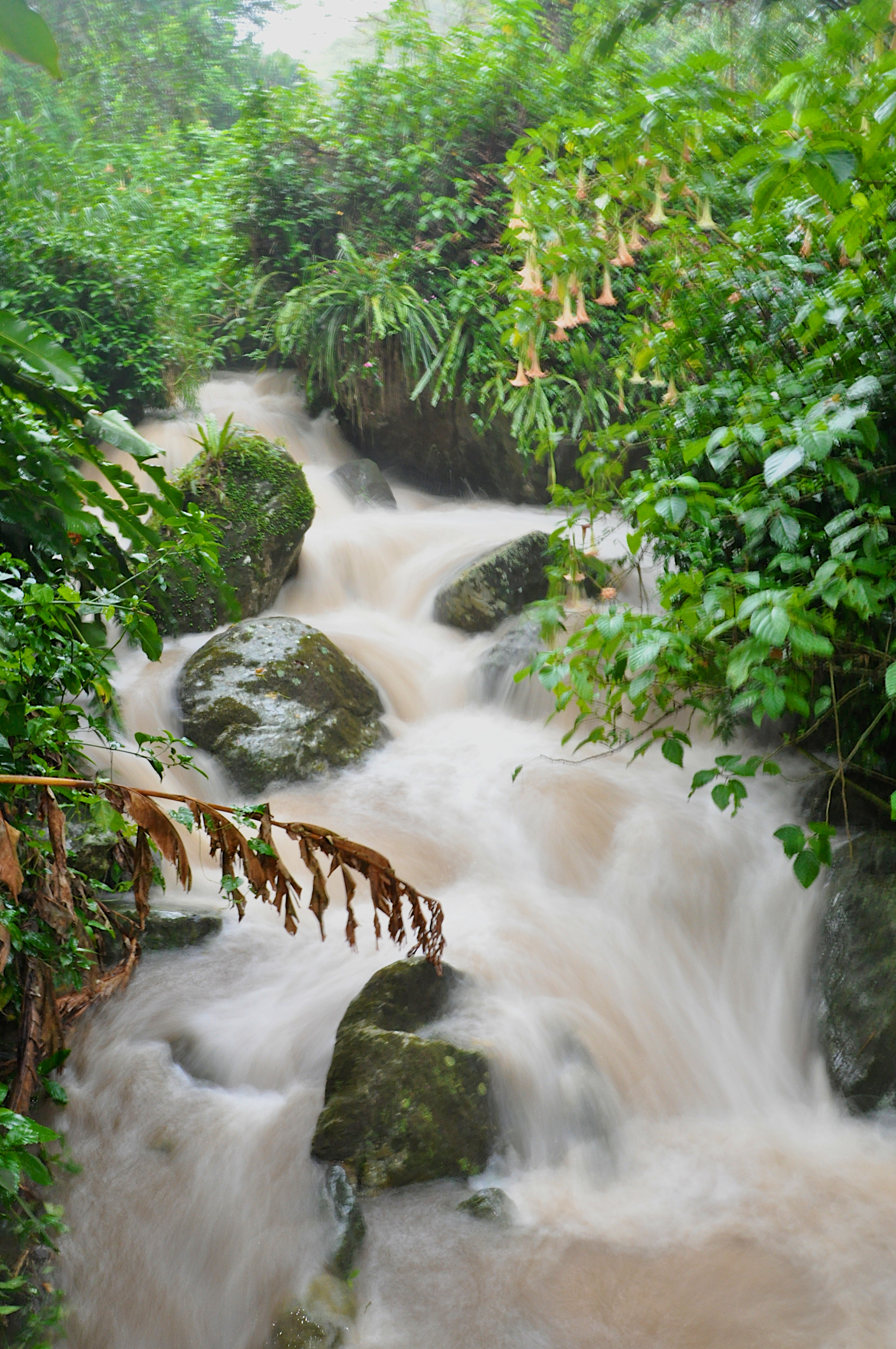
Waterfall in Toro Negro River

== See also ==
- List of rivers of Puerto Rico
- Toro Negro State Forest
