= Ciales, Puerto Rico =

Town and municipality of Puerto Rico

Ciales, Puerto Rico Municipio de Ciales
- Town and Municipality
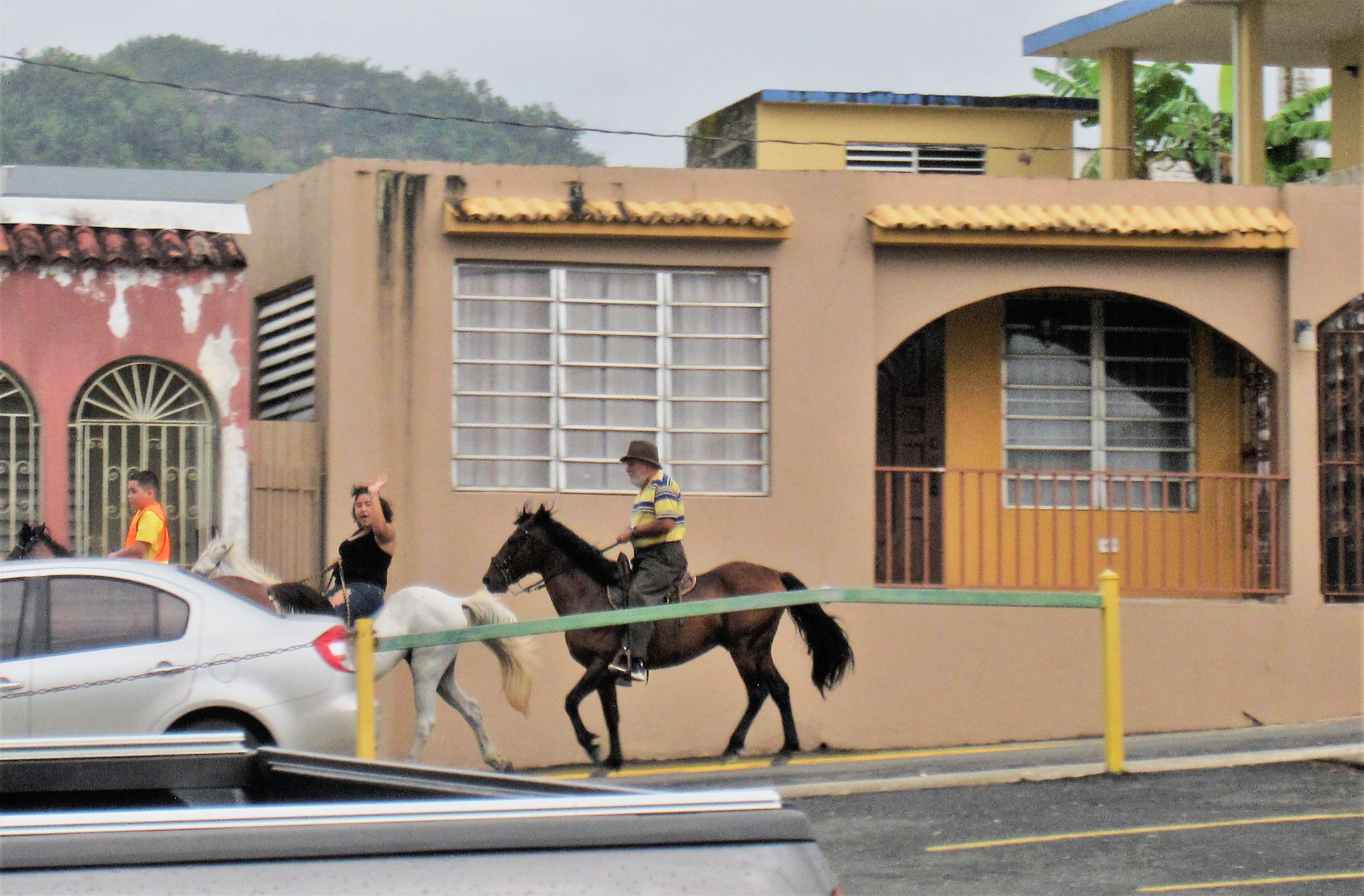
- Horse-back riding in Ciales barrio-pueblo

- Flag Coat of arms
- Nicknames: See below
- Anthem: "El cantar de tus ríos es mensaje"
- Map of Puerto Rico highlighting Ciales Municipality
- Coordinates: 18°20′10″N 66°28′08″W
- Sovereign state: United States
- Commonwealth: Puerto Rico
- Founded: June 24, 1820
- Founder: Isidro Rodríguez
- Barrios: 9 barrios: Ciales barrio-pueblo; Cialitos; Cordillera; Frontón; Hato Viejo; Jaguas; Pesas; Pozas; Toro Negro

Government
  - Mayor: Alexander Burgos Otero (PNP)
  - Senatorial dist.: 3 – Arecibo
  - Representative dist.: 13

Area
  - Total: 66.48 sq mi (172.17 km^{2})
  - Land: 66 sq mi (172 km^{2})
  - Water: 0.066 sq mi (.17 km^{2})

Population (2020)
  - Total: 16,984
  - Estimate (2025): 16,652 ▼
  - Rank: 65th in Puerto Rico
  - Density: 256/sq mi (98.7/km^{2})
- Demonym: Cialeños
- Time zone: UTC−4 (AST)
- ZIP Code: 00638
- Area code: 787/939

Ciales (Spanish pronunciation: [ˈsjales], locally [ˈsjaleʔ]) is a town and municipality of Puerto Rico, located on the Central Mountain Range, northwest of Orocovis; south of Florida and Manatí; east of Utuado and Jayuya; and west of Morovis. Ciales is spread over eight barrios and Ciales Pueblo (the downtown area and the administrative center of the city). It is part of the San Juan-Caguas-Guaynabo Metropolitan Statistical Area.

== Toponym ==
Sources diverge on the origin of the Ciales name. Nineteenth-century historian Cayetano Coll y Toste stated that it was named as such by then-governor Gonzalo de Aróstegui Herrera in honor of General Luis de Lacy, who had gone against Ferdinand VII's absolutist wishes. Coll y Toste suggested that the Villa Lacy name came from the anagram "es-la-cy" anagram.

Other sources, such as Manuel Álvarez Nazario and Luis Hernández Aquino, put forward the theory that it comes from the plural of cibales, plural form of ciba, meaning "stony place" or "place of stones" in Taíno, which "had undergone loss of the intervocalic -b- and the addition of the Spanish suffix referring to place -al." Lisa Cathleen Green-Douglass, who carried out a study of toponymics in Puerto Rico and compared both theories, believed the latter to be most plausible since Coll y Toste, per Green-Douglass, must have defined an anagram as a reversal of syllables and the resulting "Cial" or "Cyal" would have to then be made plural.

Yet others believe it originates from the Spanish sillar (meaning "carved stones") in reference to the stones carved by the Río Grande de Manatí's currents.

== History ==
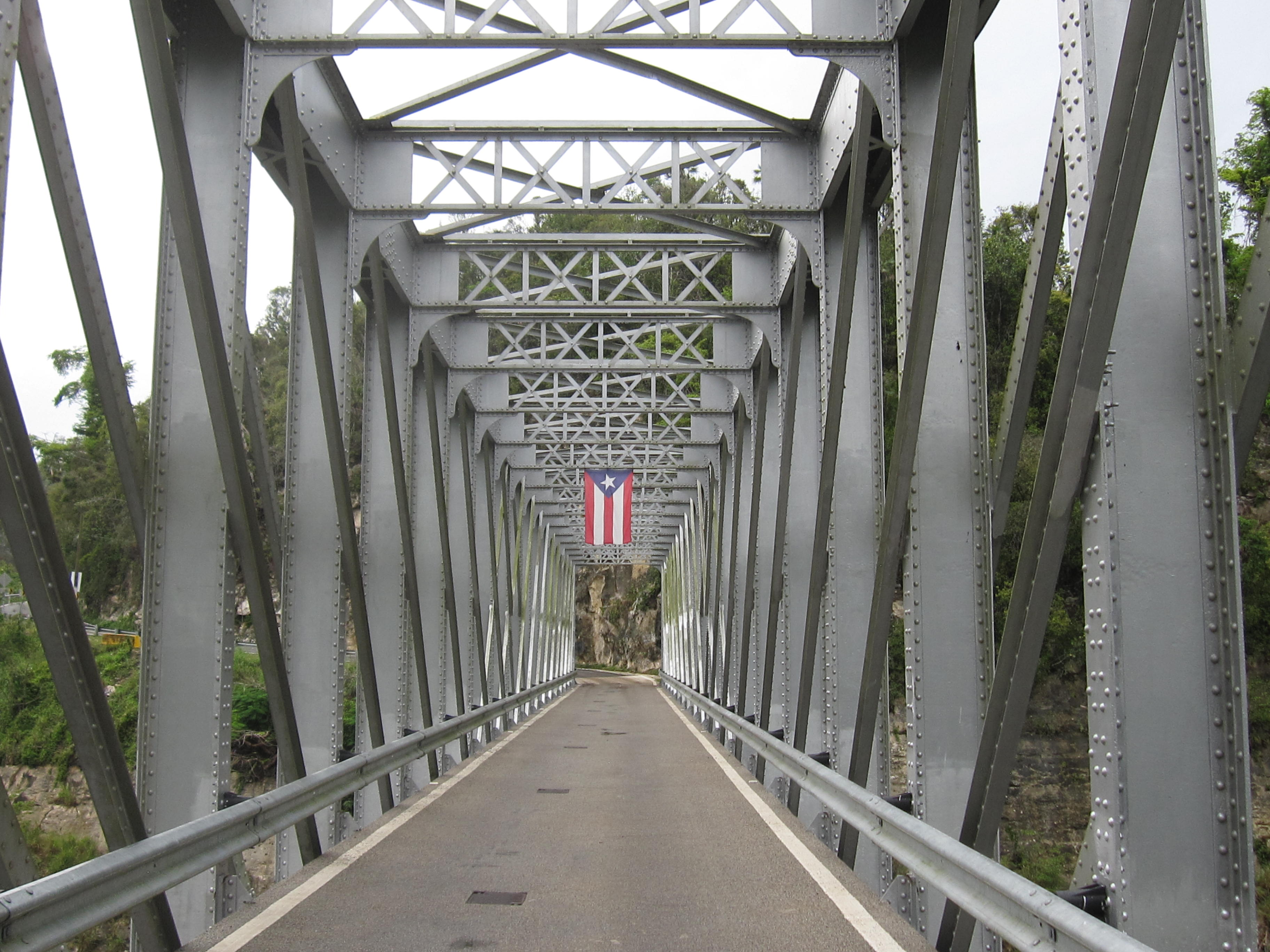
Manatí Bridge at Mata de Plátano, in Ciales

Until its founding on June 24, 1820, by Isidro Rodríguez, it was part of the neighboring Manatí municipality, a process that took four years to achieve.

On 13 August 1898, after the armistice ending the Spanish–American War was signed, Ciales was one of three towns that held uprisings. Led by Ventura Casellas, between three hundred and four hundred individuals proclaimed the Republic of Puerto Rico. However, it has not been determined without a shadow of a doubt whether it was a clear independence-supporting event or a defense of Spanish rule. Edwin Karli Padilla Aponte calls it an "alleged revolutionary uprising" since he finds no official historical record for it, even though it appears in a vignette in the Pueblos Hispanos monthly written by a Gabriel Aracelis, a possible pseudonym for Juan Antonio Corretjer. The column describes the battle, mentions the participants by name and connects it to the Grito de Lares by identifying a Pedro González as a grandson of a Manuel González who allegedly fought in the 1868 revolt, establishing a continuity between both events. Paul G. Miller, Education Commissioner between 1915 and 1921, considered this to be caused by the Seditious Parties (Partidas Sediciosas), gangs of bandits that raided Spaniards' homes in the late-nineteenth century, an idea that Corretjer refuted.

Puerto Rico was ceded by Spain in the aftermath of the Spanish–American War under the terms of the Treaty of Paris of 1898 and became a territory of the United States. In 1899, the United States Department of War conducted a census of Puerto Rico finding that the population of Ciales was 18,115.

The first truss bridge erected in Puerto Rico, after the signing of the Treaty of Paris, is in Ciales. It is over the Río Grande de Manatí and is on the list of National Register of Historic Places.

Hurricane Maria struck Puerto Rico on September 20, 2017, its eye passing through northeastern Ciales, leaving all municipalities without power for months. Ciales received 19.23 inches of rain which caused landslides. An estimated 3,000 homes in Ciales were completely destroyed by Hurricane Maria. Three months after the hurricane struck, engineers were hoping to have electrical service established, at least for the Ciales barrio-pueblo (downtown) area. The following December, the Federal Emergency Management Agency announced the opening of a disaster recovery center in Ciales to attend the home and business owners, as well as tenants, affected by the hurricane.

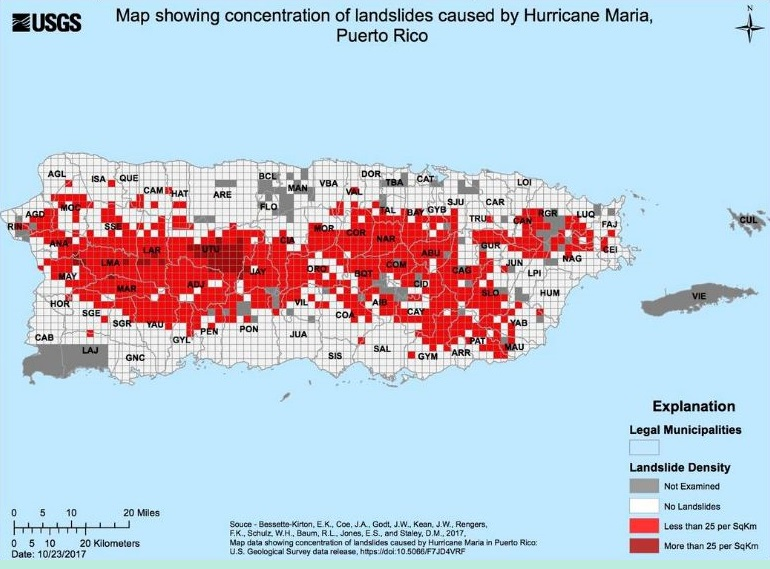
Map of landslides

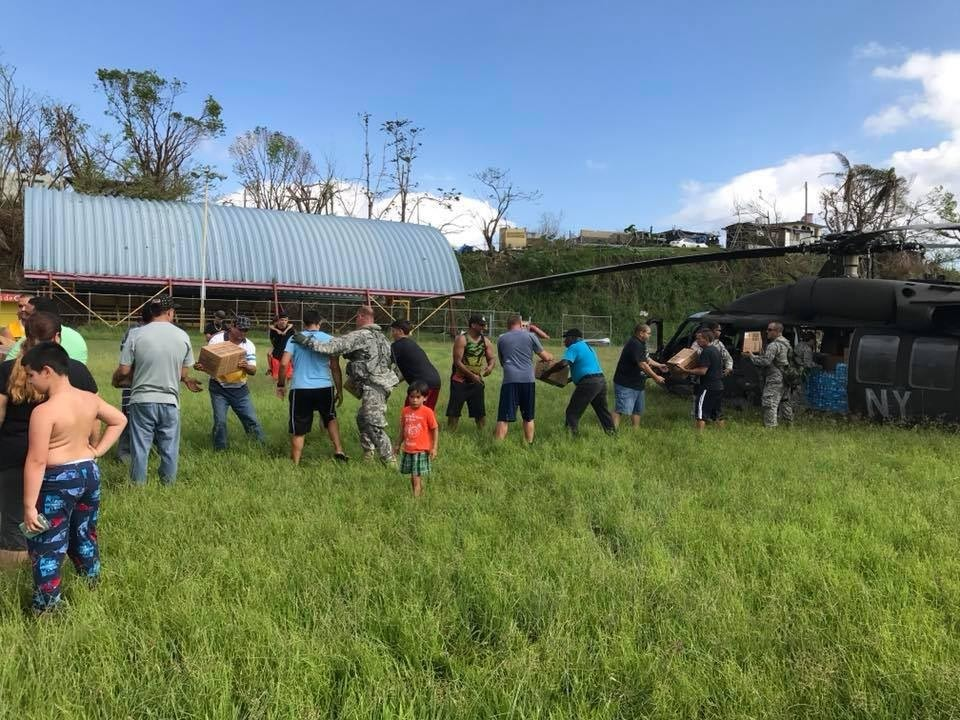
National Guard of NY in Ciales after Hurricane Maria

=== Energy consortium ===
An Energy Consortium was signed in late February, 2019 by Villalba, Orocovis, Morovis, Ciales and Barranquitas municipalities. The consortium is the first of its kind for the island. It is intended to have municipalities work together to safeguard and create resilient, and efficient energy networks, with backups for their communities. This is part of the hurricane preparedness plan of these municipalities, which were hit particularly hard by Hurricane Maria on September 20, 2017.

== Geography ==
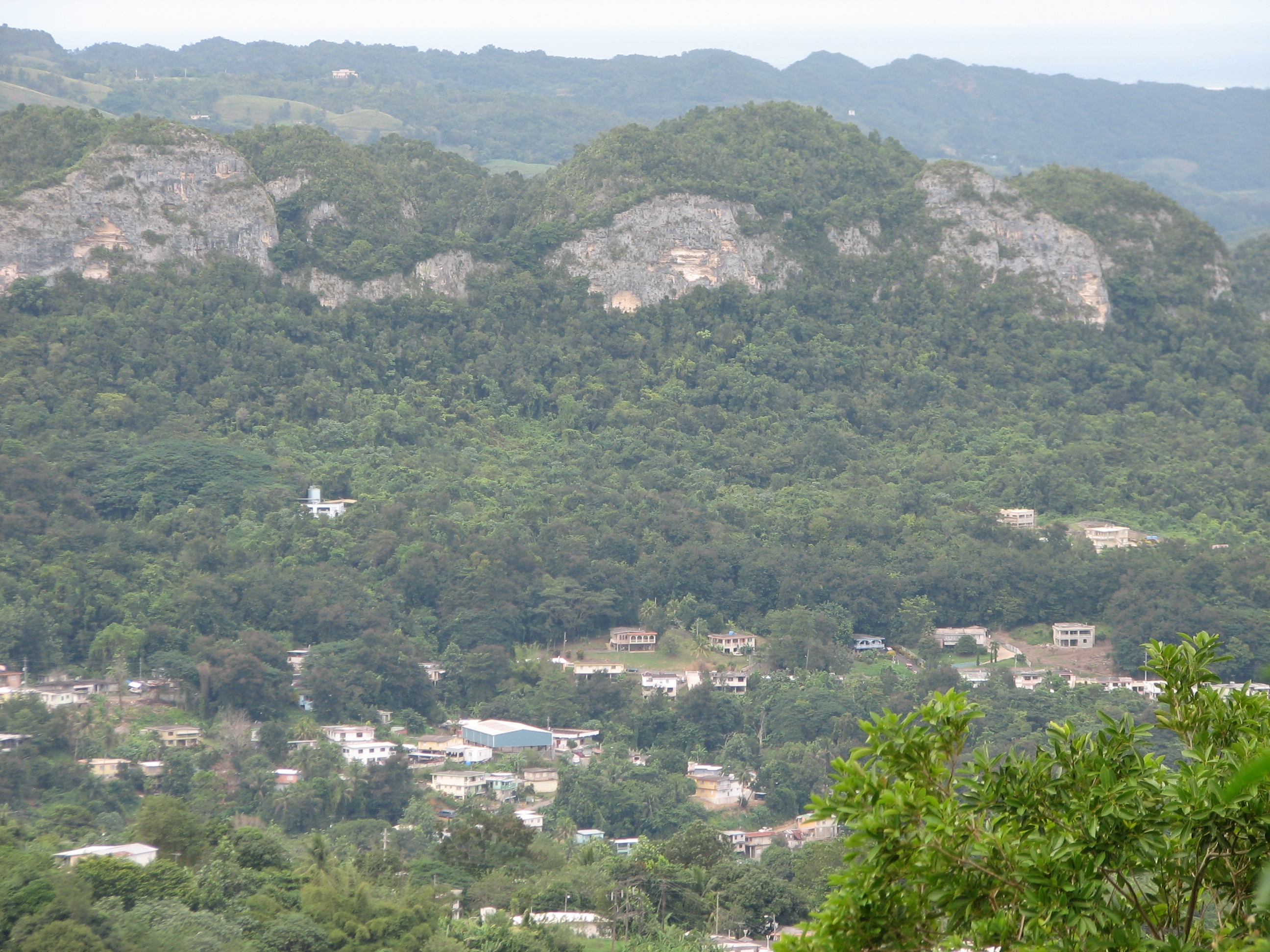
View of homes and mountainside of an area of Ciales from Paseo Lineal Juan Antonio Corretjera lookout point

The northern part of the municipality is located in the Northern Karst zone of Puerto Rico while the southern part is in the Cordillera Central. The highest point in the municipality is Cerro Rosa at 4,143 feet (1,262 m), itself the third highest point in Puerto Rico. Ciales is home to a forest reserve called Toro Negro Forest Reserve and a number of rivers including: Río Cialitos, Río Grande de Manatí, Río Toro Negro, Río Yunes, Pozas, and Barbas. Over 40% of its territory falls within protected areas, ranking as the 6th municipality with the largest portion of protected territory overall. Consequentially, the destruction of 508 native planted trees at the Finca Don Ingenio in the Toro Negro Forest Reserve in August 2021 was caused for an uproar. The trees, which included ceiba and maga specimens, had been planted as part of the Hurricane Maria recovery by the Puerto Rico Conservation Trust's Para La Naturaleza program.

As part of the karst region, there are many caves, such as Archillas Cave, located in Jaguas Ventana, named after the family that owns it. Since Ciales has a saying "to graduate as a Cialeño, you have to go up to the Archillas," (Note: Spanish: para graduarse de cialeño hay que subir a las Archillas.) then-mayor Luis R. Maldonado Rodriguez attempted to acquire it. The cave has been associated with the Arcaicos, though it also holds some Taíno petroglyphs. The cave system was first studied by Alphonse L. Pinart in 1890. Since then several investigations have been carried out that have aided in the identification of silex as the main material used by the Taíno for their carving tools and the discovery of ceramic fragments, as well as the theory that the caves were used for rituals, such as cojoba-induced ceremonies. During his research in the early 1900s, Jesse Walter Fewkes identified the Ciales' caves as some those occupied by the Taíno as well as several of the best preserved sites with their stone-carved implements. One of these caves, La Cohoba Cave, was named after the namesake object found in it. Another notable find, carried out by Carlos M. Ayes Suárez, was of a zoomorphic idol from the Arcaico era in Pesas that "consists of a cobble that presents an engraved representation seemingly zoomorphic in shape" which is considered unique in Puerto Rico and the Antilles.

Due to the mountainous nature of Ciales' topography, landslides occur, such as the rock fall that occurred in June 2021 in Pozas that caused several buildings and fences to be destroyed, road closures and the removal of residents.

=== Barrios ===
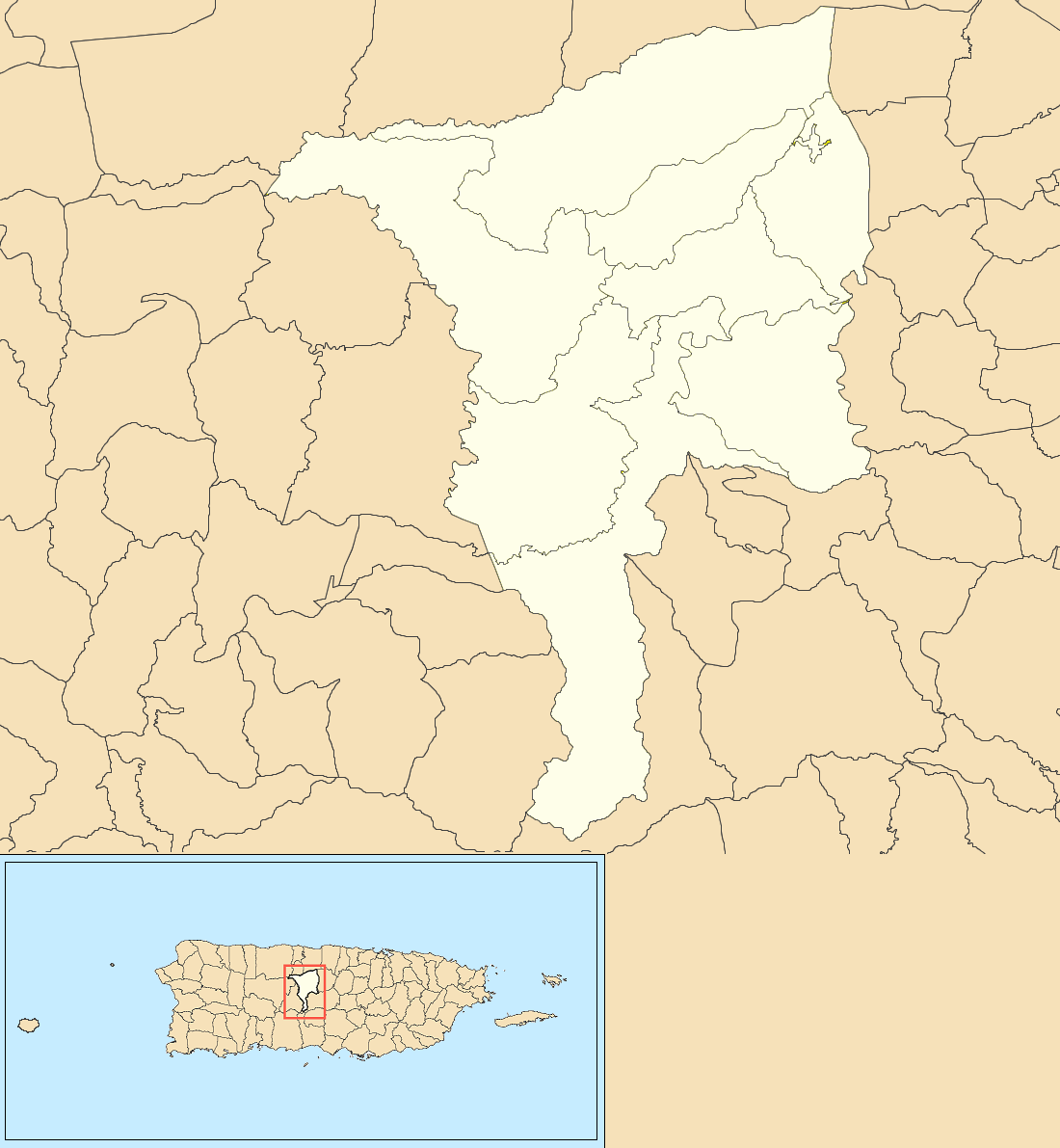
Ciales map with barrio subdivisions

Like all municipalities of Puerto Rico, Ciales is subdivided into barrios. The municipal buildings, central square and large Catholic church are located in a barrio referred to as "el pueblo".

1. Ciales barrio-pueblo
2. Cialitos
3. Cordillera
4. Frontón
5. Hato Viejo
6. Jaguas
7. Pesas
8. Pozas
9. Toro Negro

=== Sectors ===
Barrios (which are like minor civil divisions) are further subdivided into smaller areas called sectores (sectors in English). The types of sectores may vary, from sector to urbanización to reparto to barriada to residencial, among others.

=== Special Communities ===
Comunidades Especiales de Puerto Rico (Special Communities of Puerto Rico) are marginalized communities whose citizens are experiencing a certain amount of social exclusion. A map shows these communities occur in nearly every municipality of the commonwealth. Of the 742 places that were on the list in 2014, the following barrios, communities, sectors, or neighborhoods were in Ciales: Sector El Hoyo in Pozas, Calle Morovis, Comunidad Los Ortega, Cruces-Cialitos, Parcelas Cordillera, Parcelas María, Parcelas Seguí, Santa Clara, and Toro Negro.

== Demographics ==
Historical population
Census	Pop.	Note	%±
1900	18,115		—
1910	18,398		1.6%
1920	20,730		12.7%
1930	20,492		−1.1%
1940	22,906		11.8%
1950	19,464		−15.0%
1960	18,106		−7.0%
1970	15,595		−13.9%
1980	16,211		3.9%
1990	18,084		11.6%
2000	19,811		9.5%
2010	18,782		−5.2%
2020	16,984		−9.6%
2025 (est.)	16,652	▼	−2.0%
U.S. Decennial Census; 1899 (shown as 1900) 1910-1930; 1930-1950 1960-2000 2010 2020

Ciales has one of the lowest percentages of English speakers in Puerto Rico.

When researching the town's parochial baptismal records historian Fernando Picó found that more than half the offspring baptised at the end of the nineteenth century were born out of wedlock.

== Tourism ==
To stimulate local tourism, the Puerto Rico Tourism Company launched the Voy Turistiendo ("I'm Touring") campaign, with a passport book and website. The Ciales page lists Museo Juan Antonio Corretjer, Puente Mata de Plátano, and Cascada Las Delicias, as places of interest.

=== Landmarks and places of interest ===
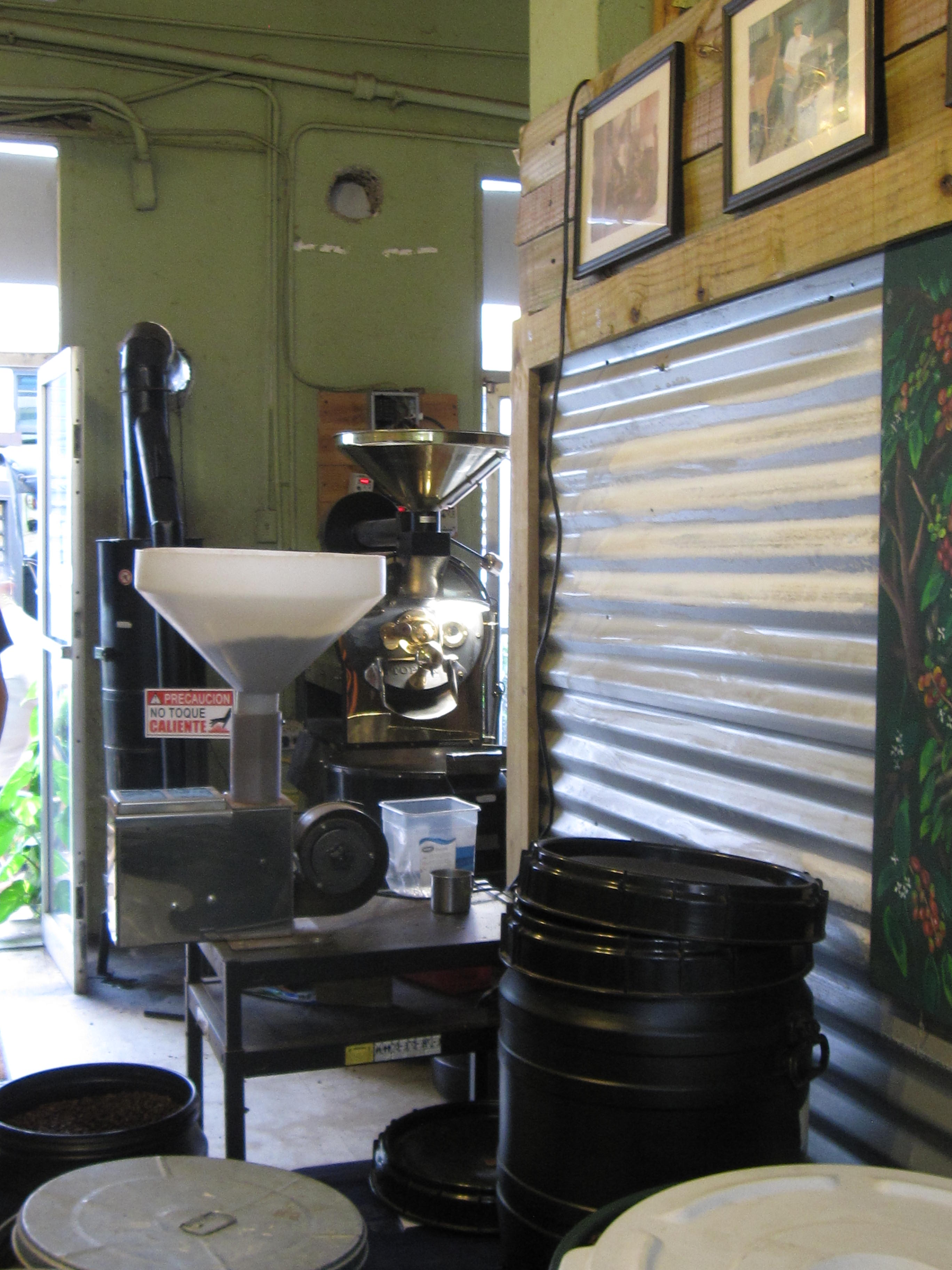
Coffee Museum, Ciales, Puerto Rico

Places of interest in Ciales include:

- Hacienda Carvajal, environmental education coffee and cacao farm that also houses a printing museum and a batey.
- Las Archillas Cave
- Las Golondrinas Cave
- Yuyú Cave
- Parada Choferil
- Toro Negro Forest Reserve
- Paseo Lineal Juan Antonio Corretjer, a lookout
- Museo Biblioteca Casa Corretjer, houses the library of Juan Antonio Corretjer.
- Museo del Café, a coffee museum

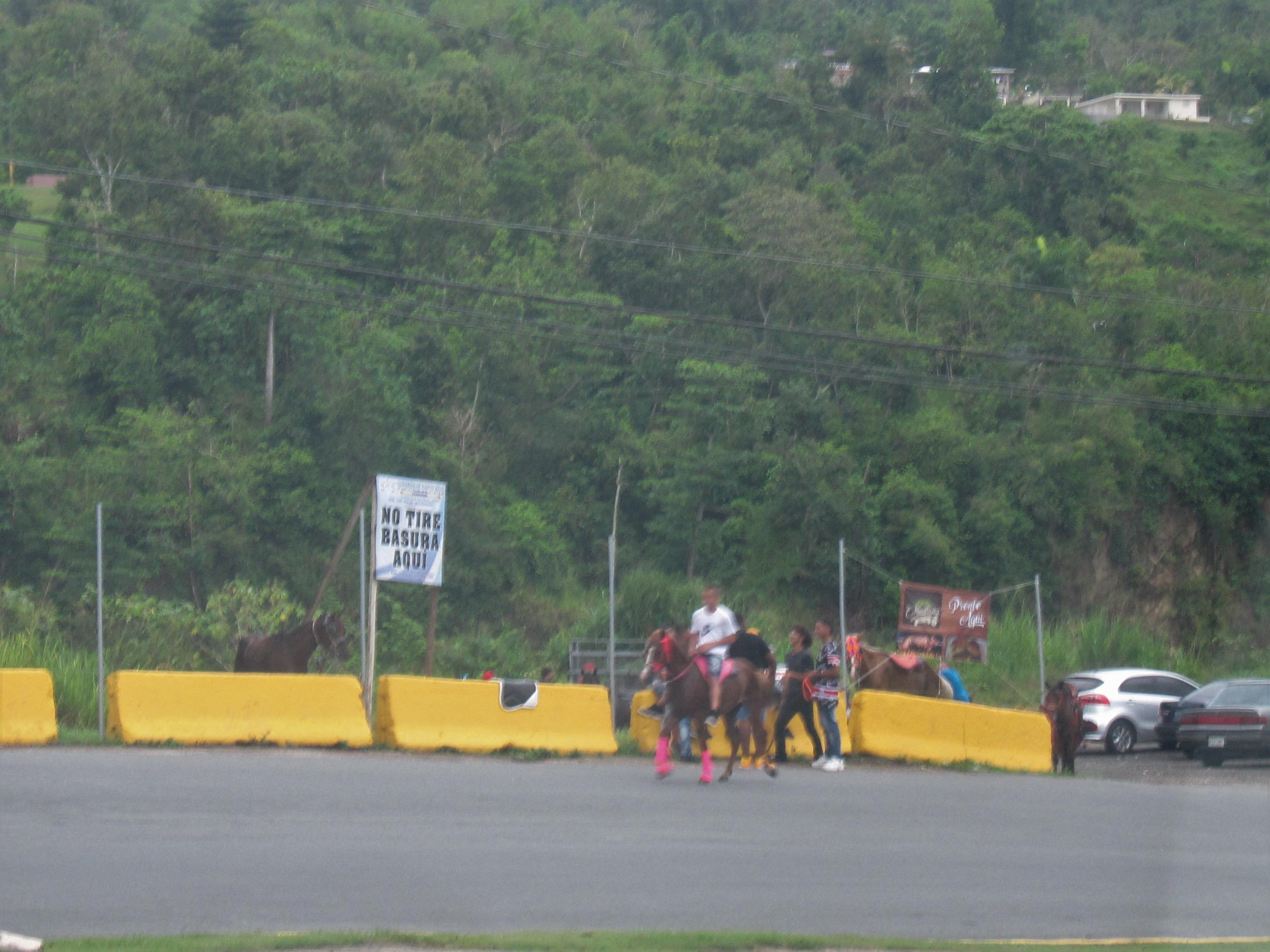
Young people horse-back riding in Ciales, Puerto Rico

== Culture ==
=== Festivals and events ===
Ciales celebrates its patron saint festival in October. The Fiestas Patronales de Nuestra Señora del Rosario y San Jose is a religious and cultural celebration that generally features parades, games, artisans, amusement rides, regional food, and live entertainment. The festival has featured live performances by well-known artists such as Sabor Latino.

Other festivals and events celebrated in Ciales include:

- Three King's Day, held in January
- Corretjer Cantata, held in March
- Fresh Water Festival (in Spanish: Festival de Agua Dulce), mud bogging competition and music festival held in August
- Frontón Festival, held in July
- Saint Elías Festival, held in July

=== Sports ===
Ciales is the home town of Juan "Pachín" Vicens – Puerto Rico's national basketball star, named Best Player in the World at the 1959 World Basketball Championship, Santiago de Chile (a.k.a., Juan "Pachín" Vicens, "Astro del Balón", "El Jeep"; younger brother of Puerto Rico's National Poet, Nimia Vicens, who also hailed from Ciales). Their middle brother, Enrique "Coco" Vicens, a former Puerto Rico Senator, was a track and field athlete in his own right.

== Economy ==
=== Agriculture ===
The Ciales economy has always depended heavily on agriculture, especially coffee products, minor fruits (such as lettuce) and dairy production.

== Government ==
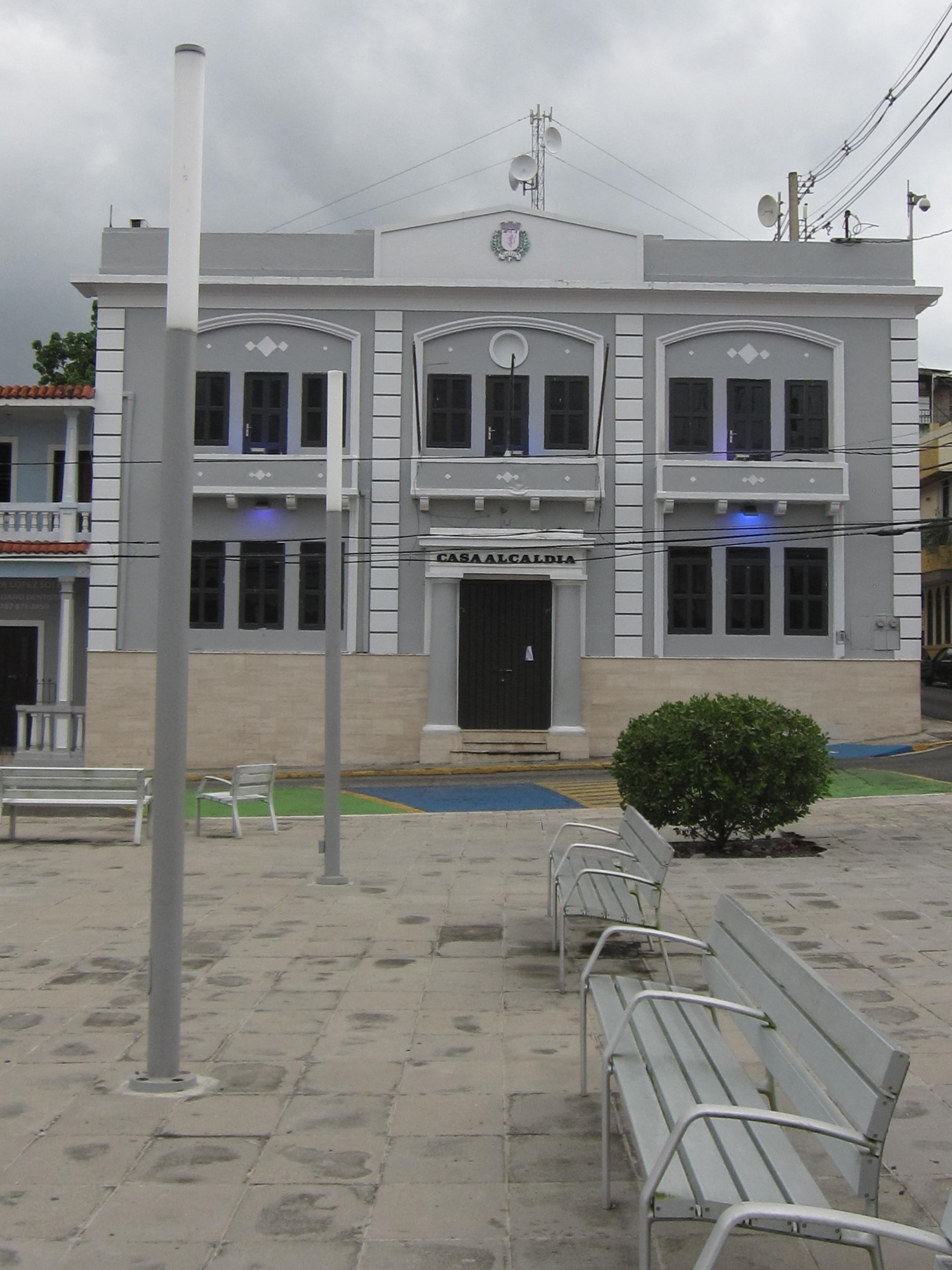
Town Hall in Ciales barrio-pueblo, Puerto Rico

All municipalities in Puerto Rico are administered by a mayor, elected every four years. The current mayor of Ciales is Jesús Resto, of the Popular Democratic Party (PPD). He was first elected at the 2024 general elections.

The city belongs to the Puerto Rico Senatorial district III, which is represented by two Senators. In 2024, Brenda Pérez Soto and Gabriel González were elected as District Senators.

== Symbols ==
The municipio has an official flag and coat of arms. On the 150th anniversary of the founding of Ciales, the flag and coat of arms were adopted with Resolution No. 13 Series 1969–1970, sanctioned by Don Ismael Nazario, who was mayor at the time.

=== Flag ===
The flag is divided into seven unequal stripes described in sequence: yellow, red, yellow, purple, yellow, red, and yellow.

=== Coat of arms ===
The coat of arms consists of a gold shield with a lion standing on its rear legs and silver-plated nails grasping a silver coiled parchment between its front claws. The lion also shows a red tongue. Above the lion in the superior part of the shield are located three heraldic roses arranged horizontally with red petals and green leaves. A golden crown of three towers rests on the shield. The three towers are united by walls, simulating masonry blocks. The shield is surrounded by a crown of coffee tree branches with their berries, all in natural colors.

=== Nicknames ===
- Cohoba City (Spanish: Ciudad de la cojoba) for the discover of instruments used by the Taíno in the Cohoba ritual, whereby they inhaled the hallucinogenic powder extracted from the cojoba seeds.
- Town of the Brave (Pueblo de los valerosos) for the high concentration of independence supports, such as Juan Antonio Corretjer, some of which participated in the Grito de Lares.
- Cradle of Poets (Cuna de poetas) due to it being the birthplace of several poets, such as Juan Antonio Corretjer and Nimia Vicéns, both considered Puerto Rico's national poets.
- Central Cordillera Gate (Puerta de la Cordillera Central) owing to its geographic location on the Cordillera Central mountainous range.
- Switzerland of Puerto Rico (Suiza de Puerto Rico) on account of "its similarity to European valleys with abundant vegetation," and the wooden houses that are located in them.

== Transportation ==
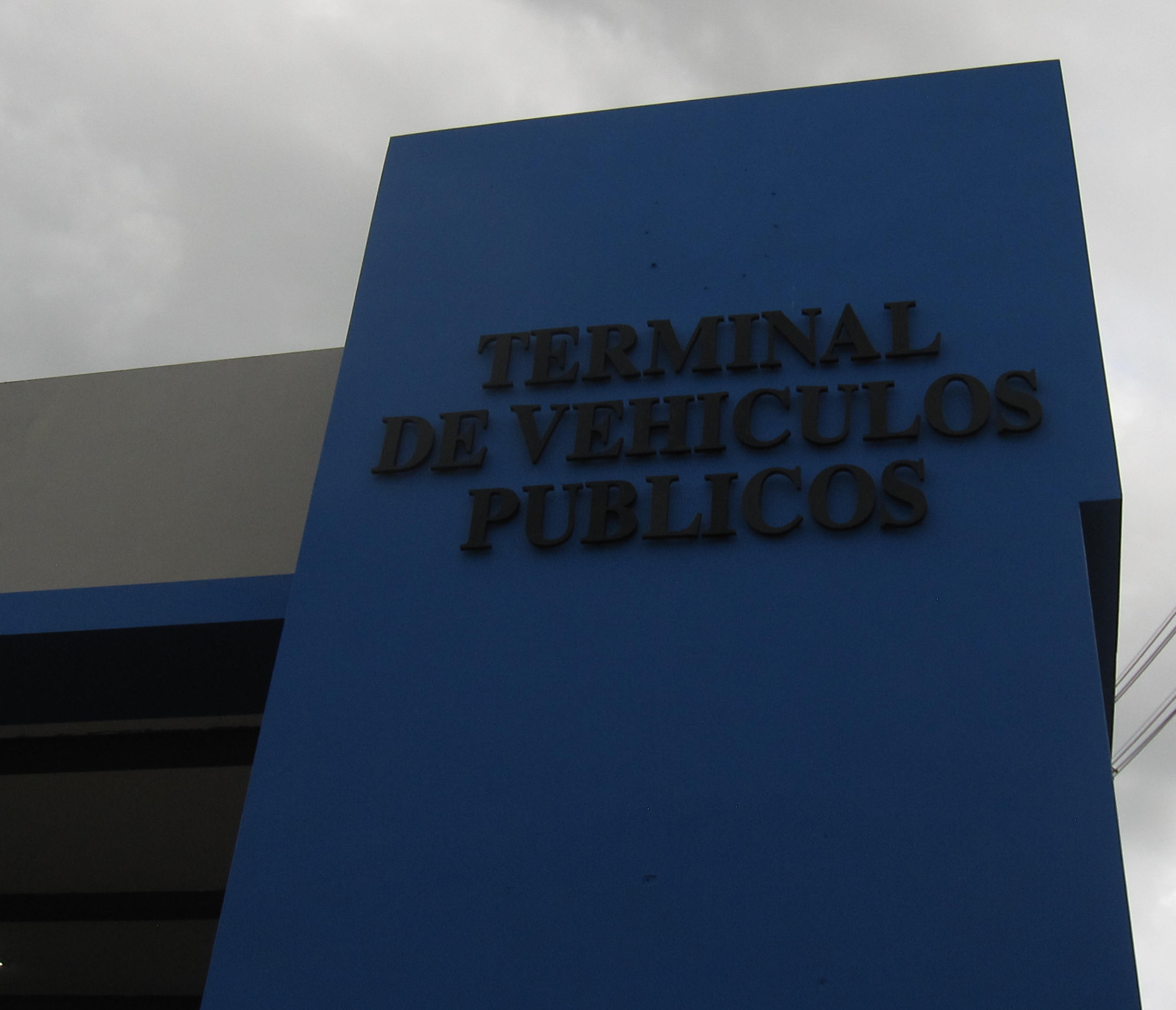
Terminal de Carros Públicos Ciales on Calle Palmer

There is a public transportation terminal in downtown Ciales. In addition, there are 18 bridges in Ciales, including the NRHP-listed Manatí Bridge at Mata de Plátano.

== Notable people ==
- Ramón Barrios – Socialist Party delegate to the Constitutional Convention of Puerto Rico.
- Juan Antonio Corretjer – nationalist and poet, considered the National Poet of Puerto Rico.
- Ángel de Jesús Sánchez – fifth Chief Justice of the Supreme Court of Puerto Rico.
- Raúl Feliciano – basketball player and lawyer.
- Ed Figueroa – MLB baseball player
- Juan Figueroa – former-president of Universal Health Care Foundation of Connecticut.
- José Emilio González Velázquez – politician
- Luis Maldonado – politician
- Ángel Chayanne Martínez – politician
- Luis Molina Casanova – film director and scriptwriter.
- Jorge Luis Morales – poet and writer
- Mercedes Otero – politician
- Edwin Reyes – poet and writer
- Gabriel Rodríguez Aguiló – politician
- Juan José Rodríguez Pérez – politician
- Hiram Rosado – nationalist
- Carlos Manuel Rosario – activist
- Luis Sánchez Morales – politician
- Adalberto Santiago – salsa singer, Tony Vega's cousin.
- Tony Vega – salsa singer, Adalberto Santiago's cousin.
- Vanessa Vélez – volleyball player.
- Enrique "Coco" Vicéns – basketball Player
- Juan "Pachín" Vicéns – basketball Player

== Notable music groups ==
- Los Pleneros de la Cresta

== Gallery ==
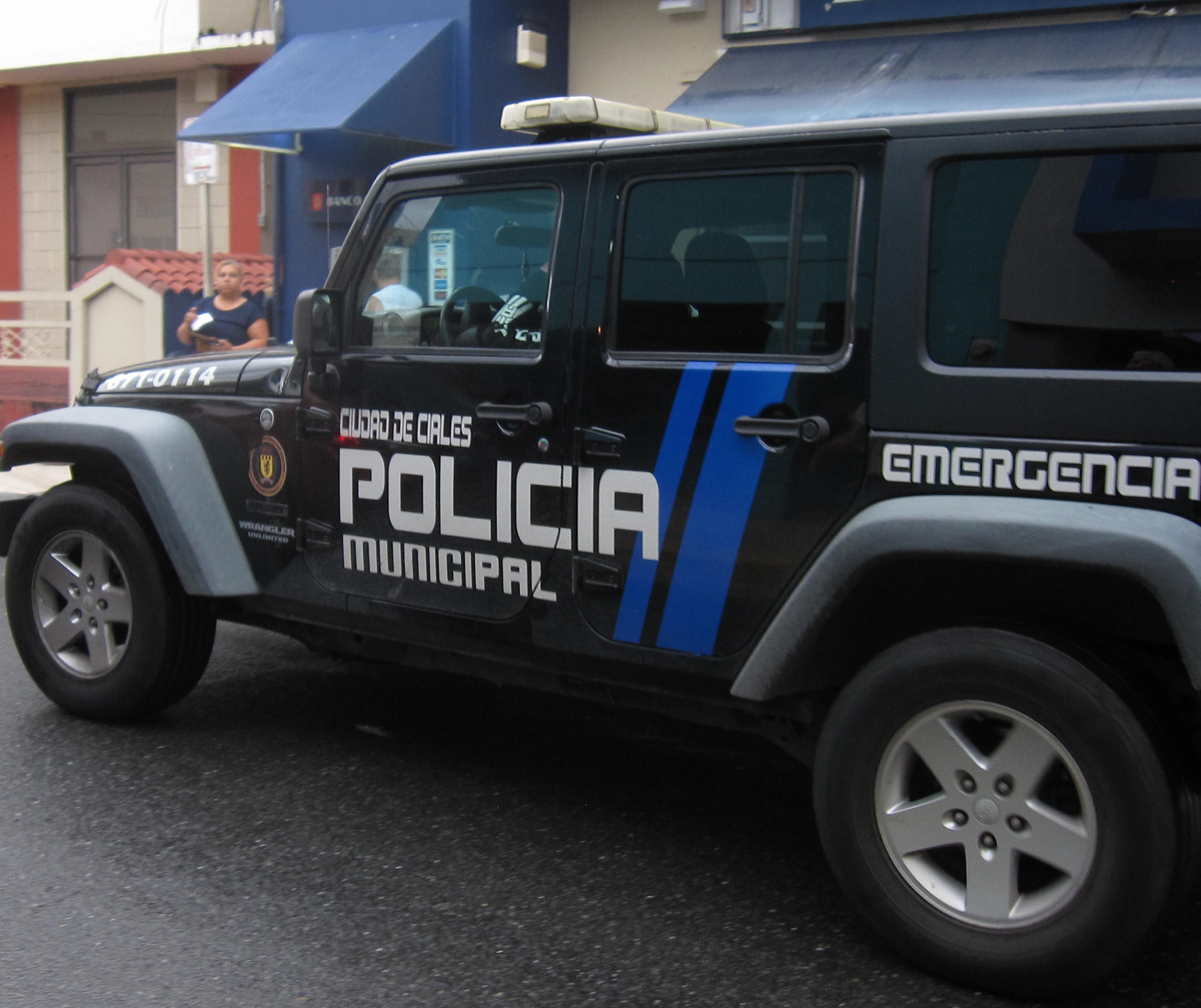
Ciales, Puerto Rico police

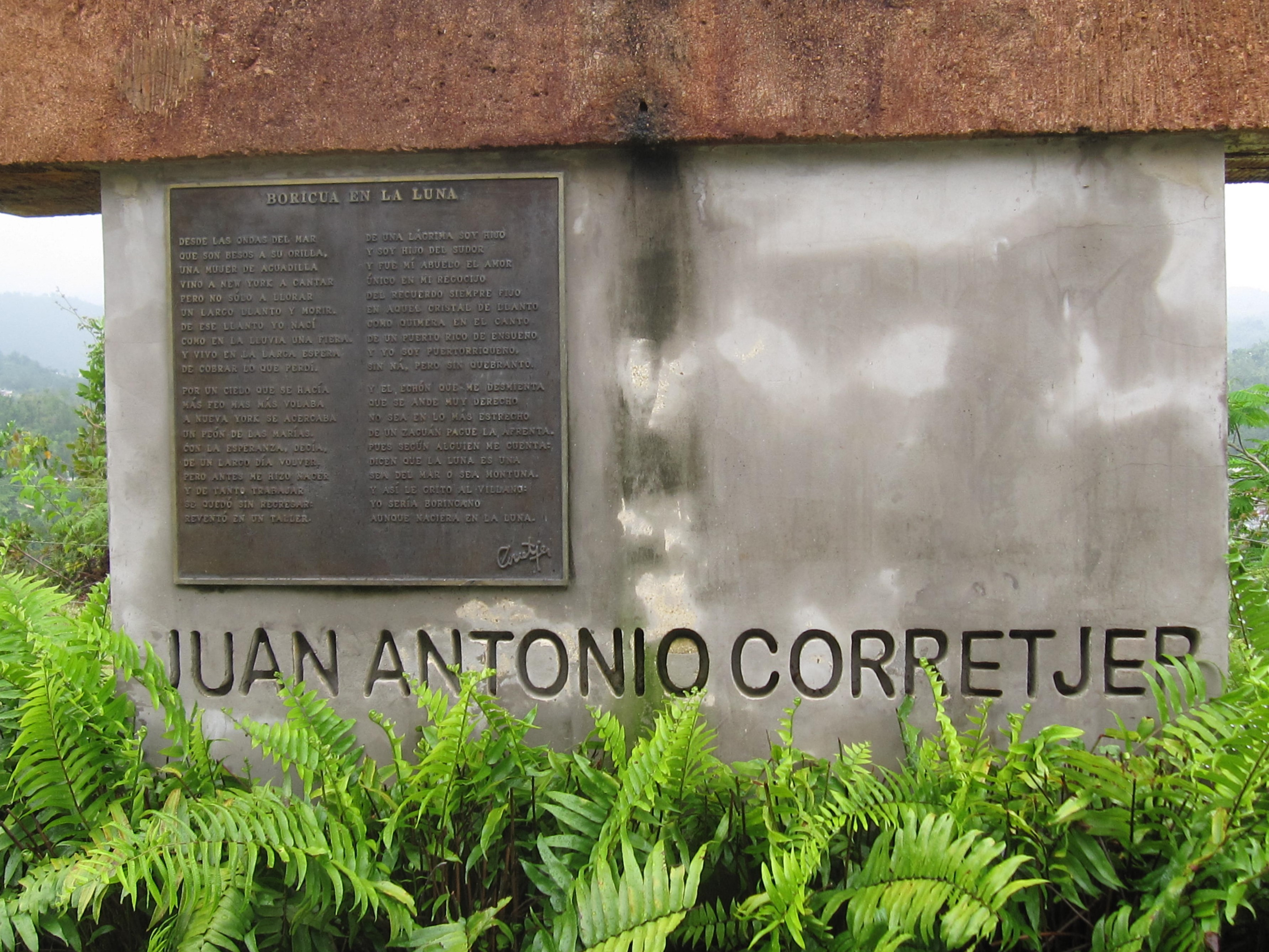
Juan Antonio Corretjer monument base at lookout in Ciales

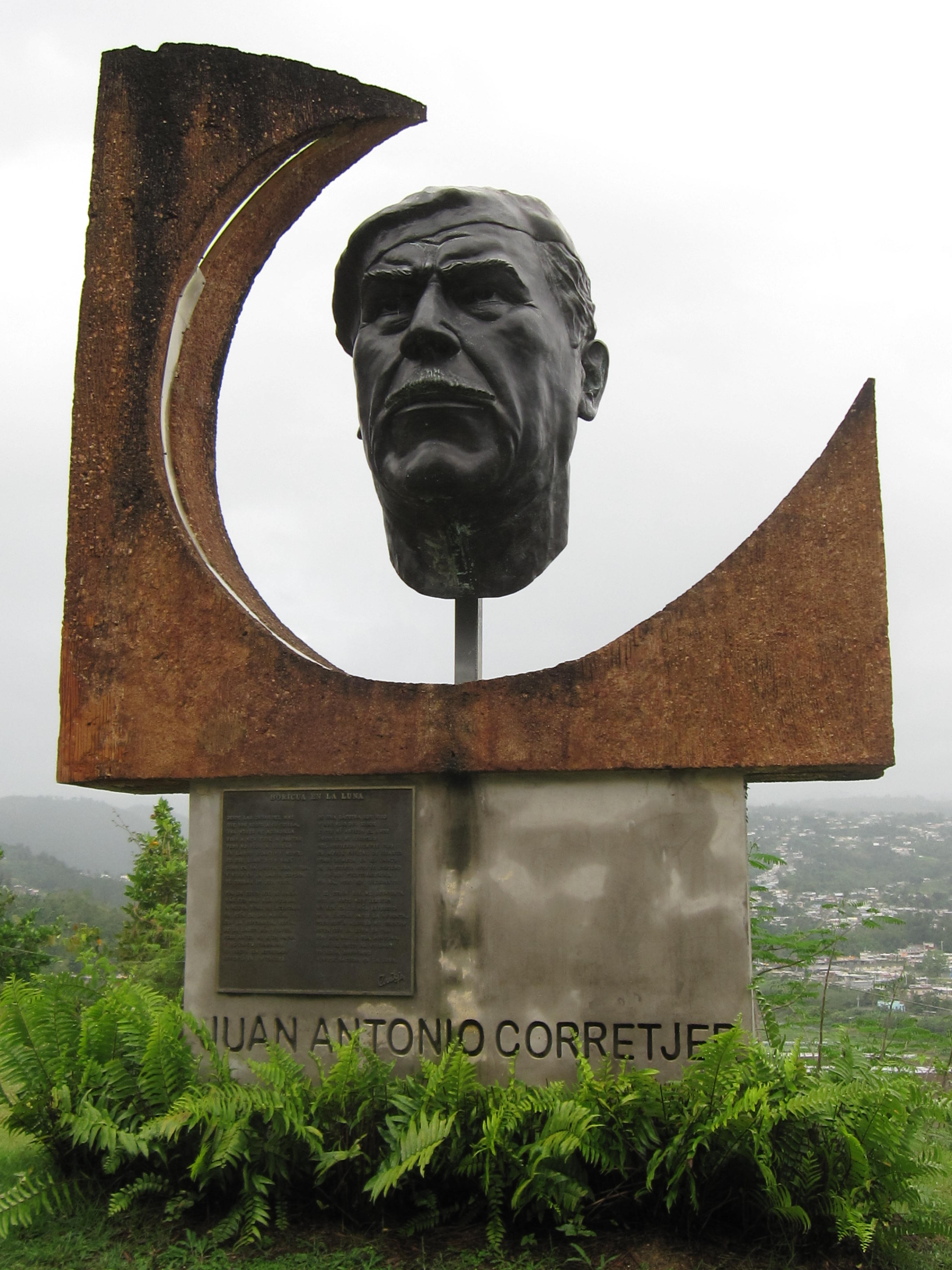
Juan Antonio Corretjer sculpture monument at lookout

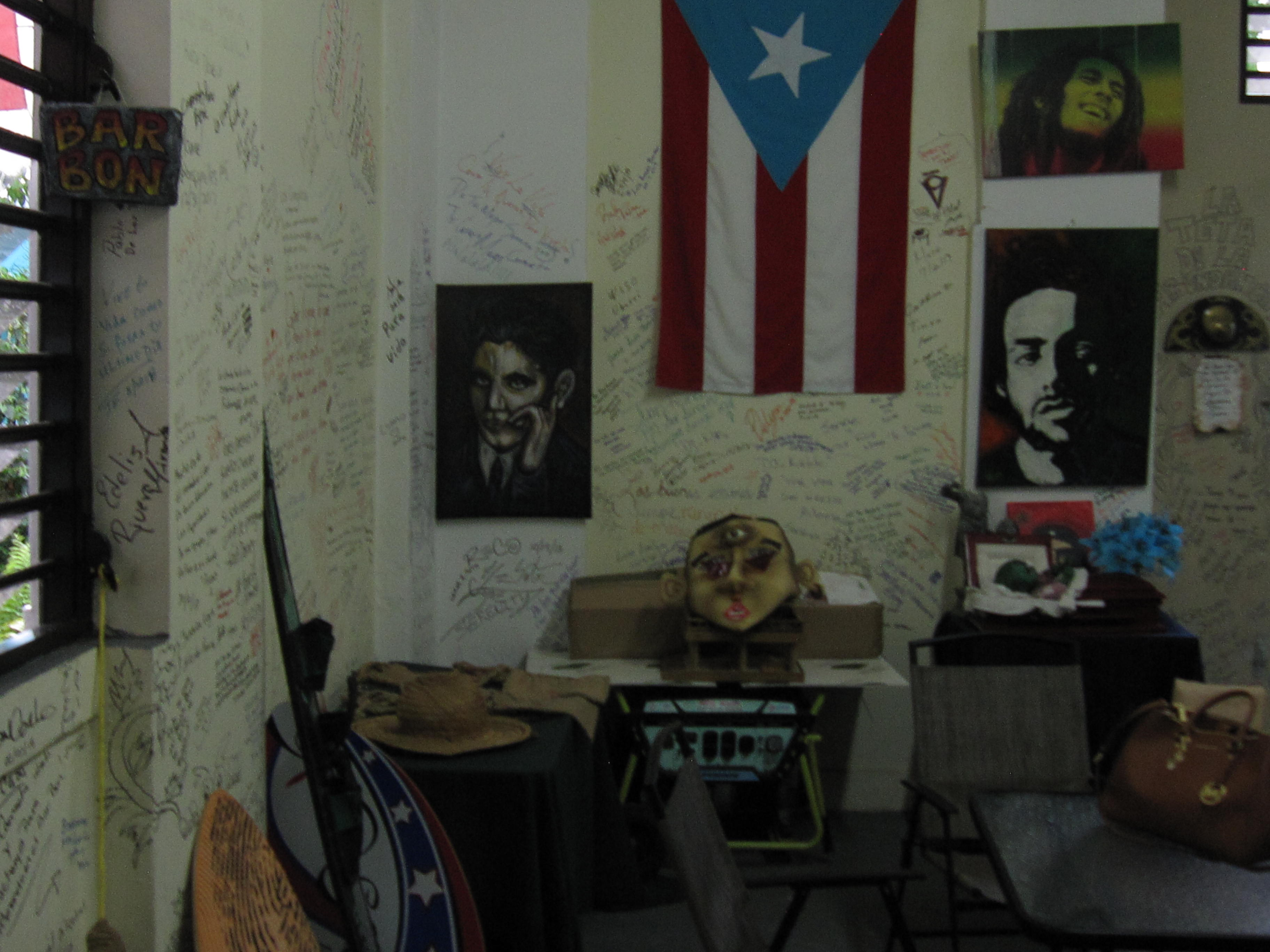
Bar in downtown Ciales, next to Coffee Museum

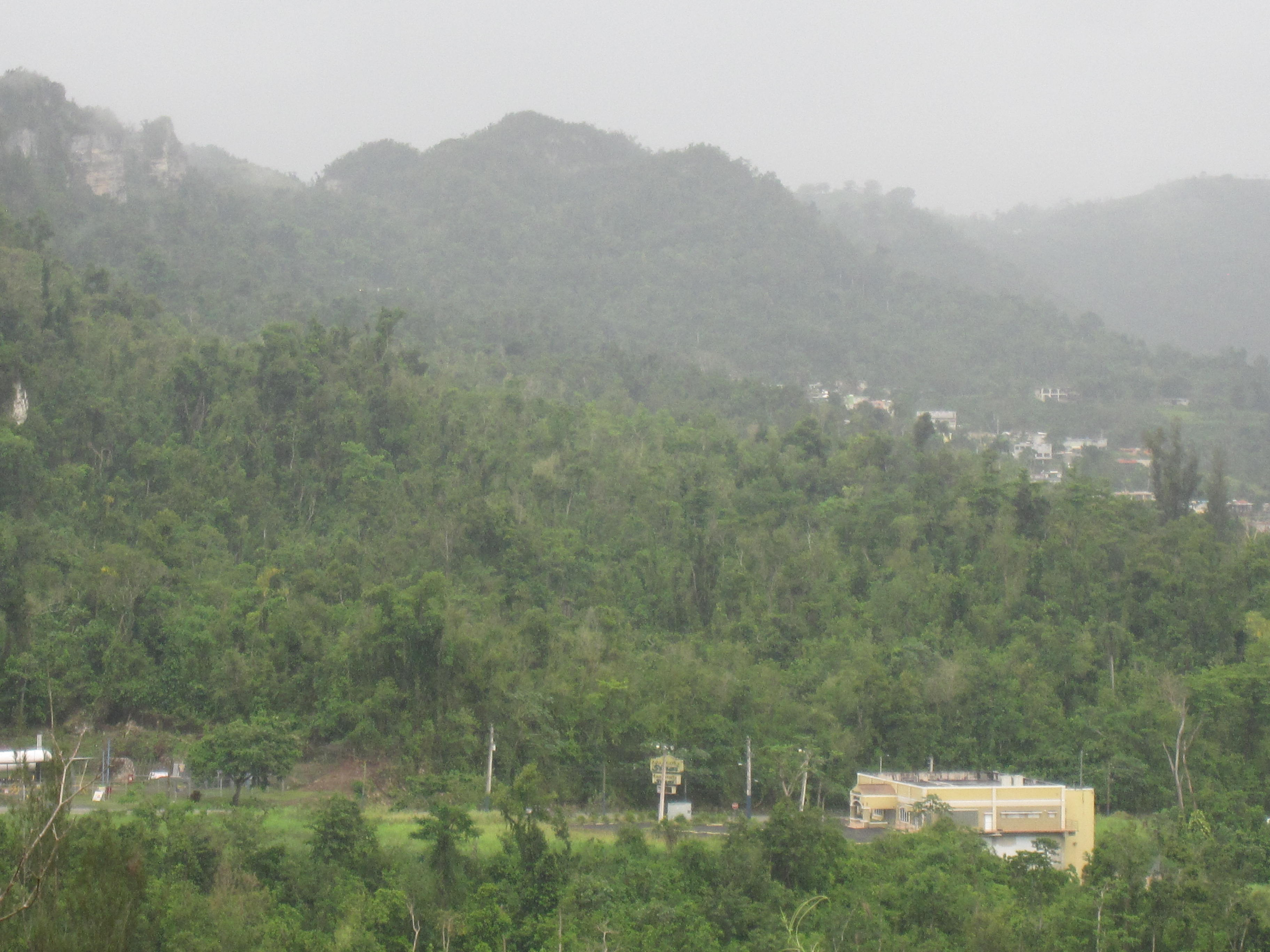
Ciales, Puerto Rico view from Paseo Lineal Juan Antonio Corretjer

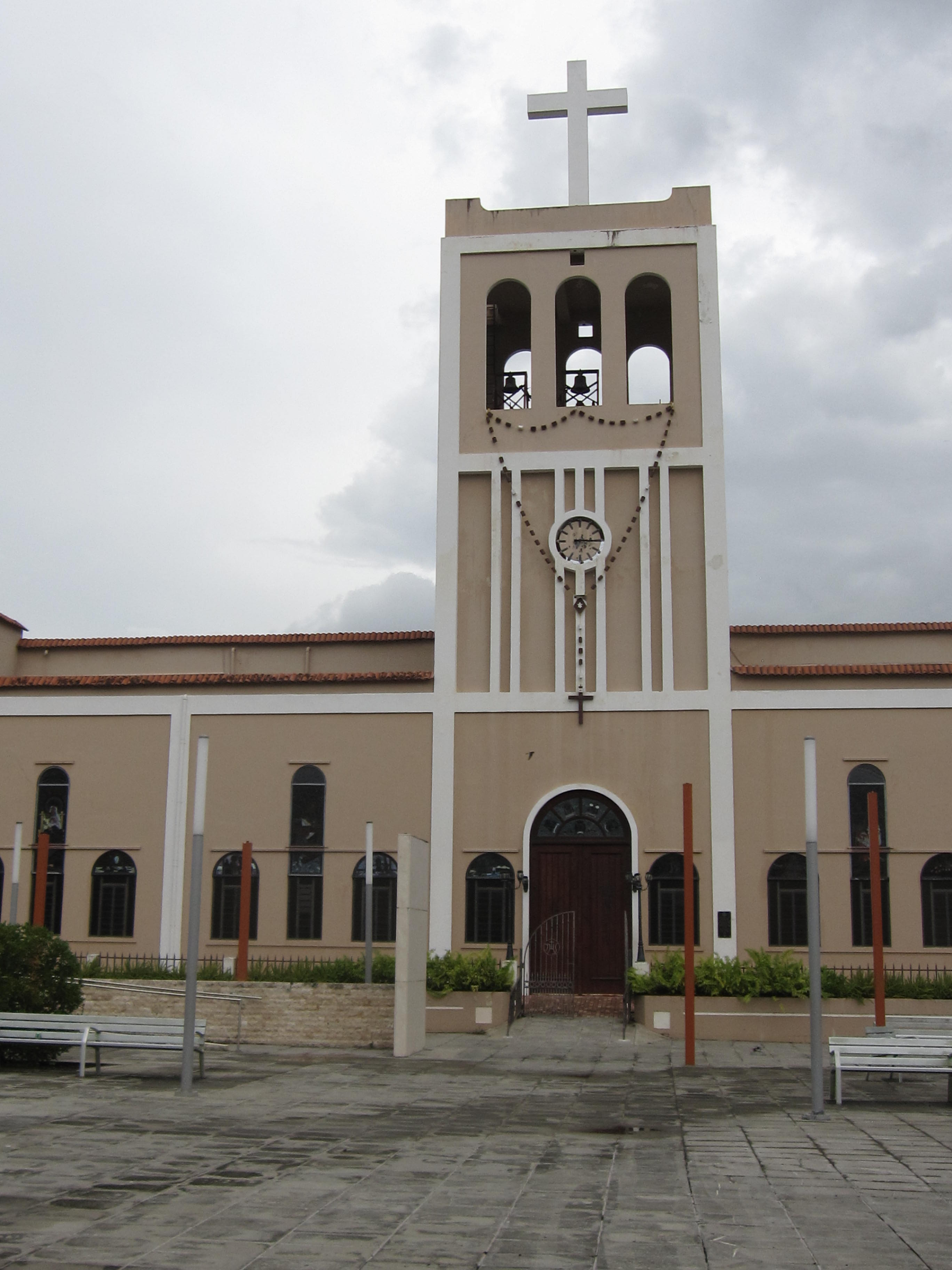
Catholic church in Ciales barrio-pueblo

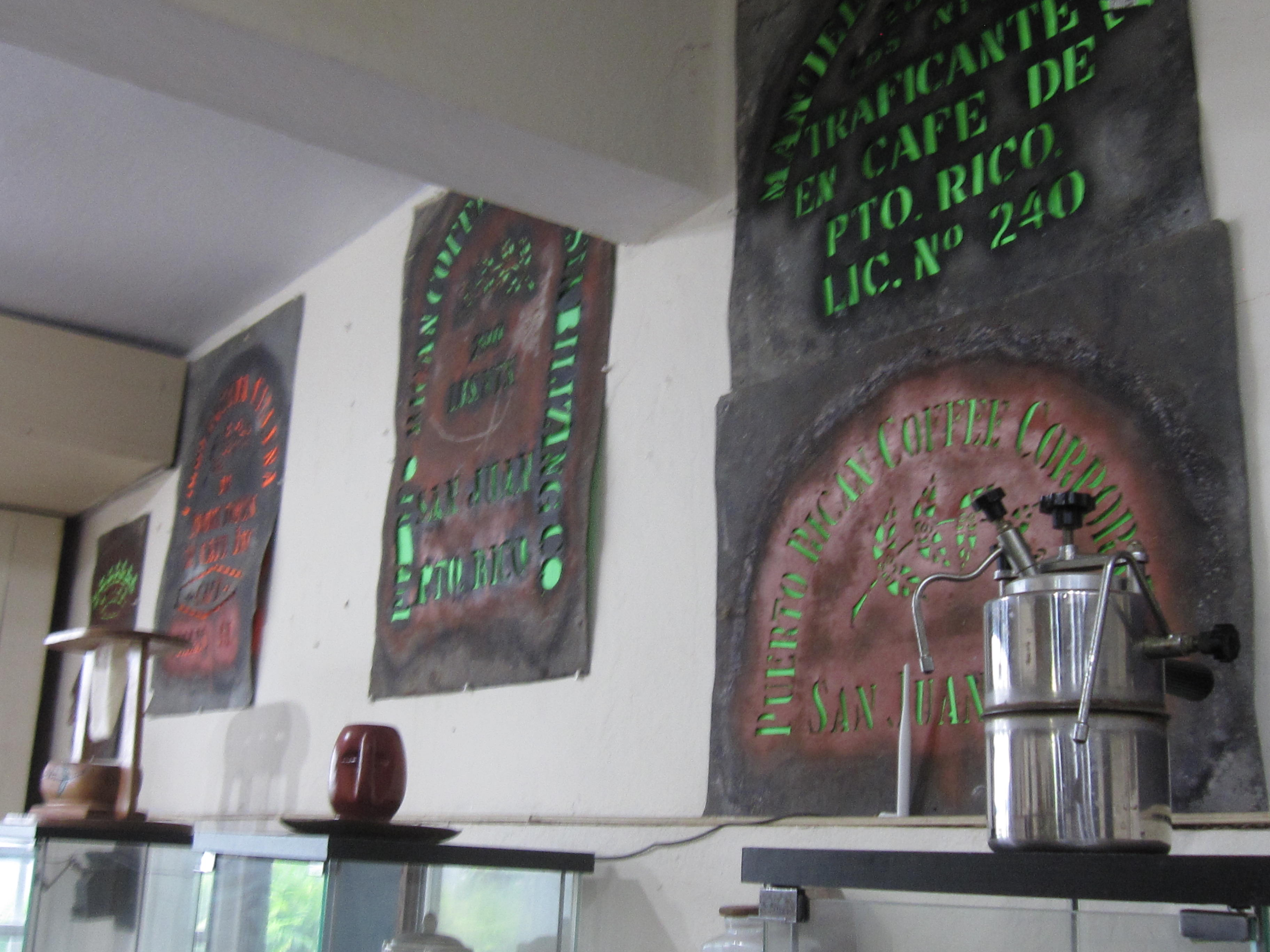
Coffee Museum

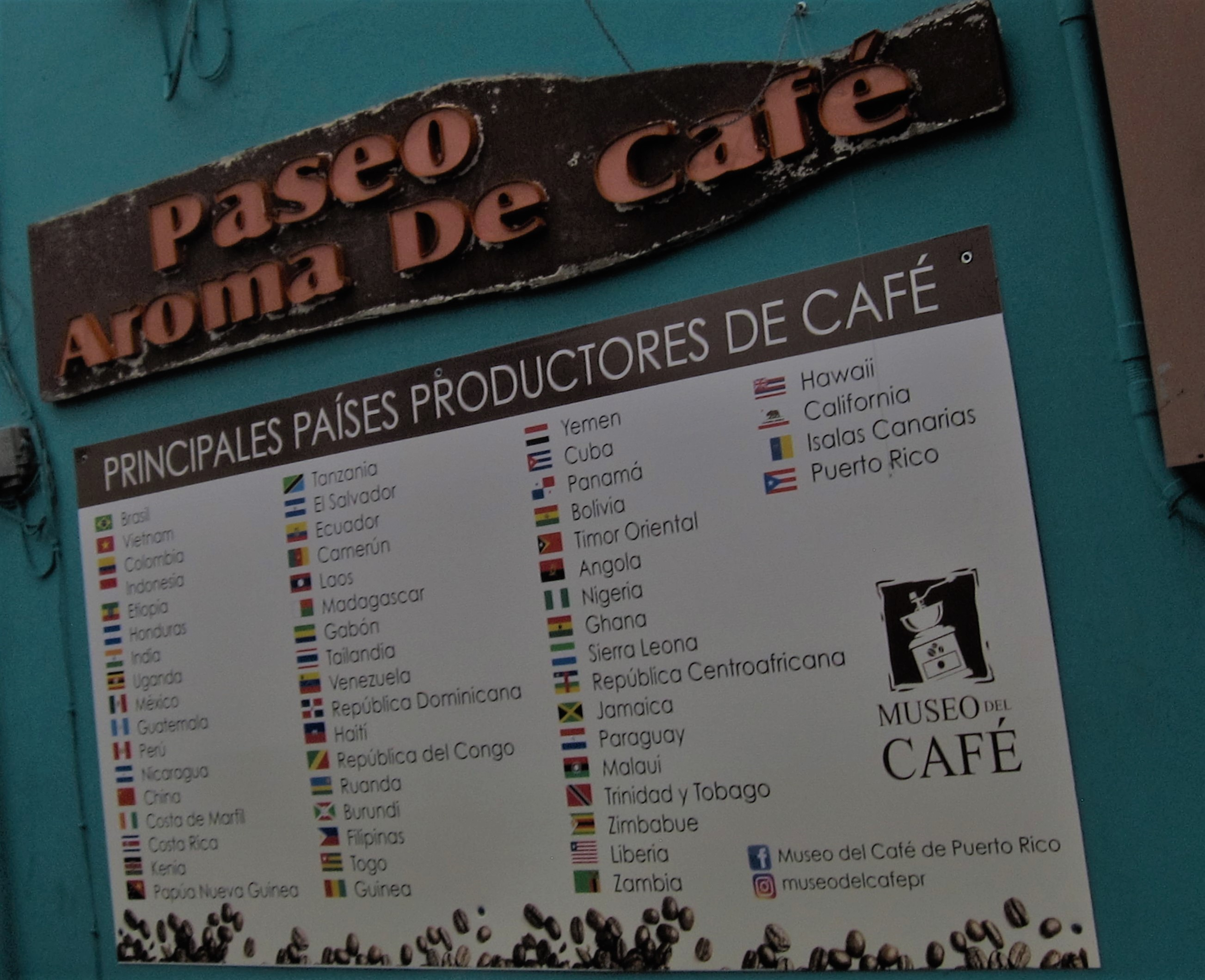
Coffee Museum

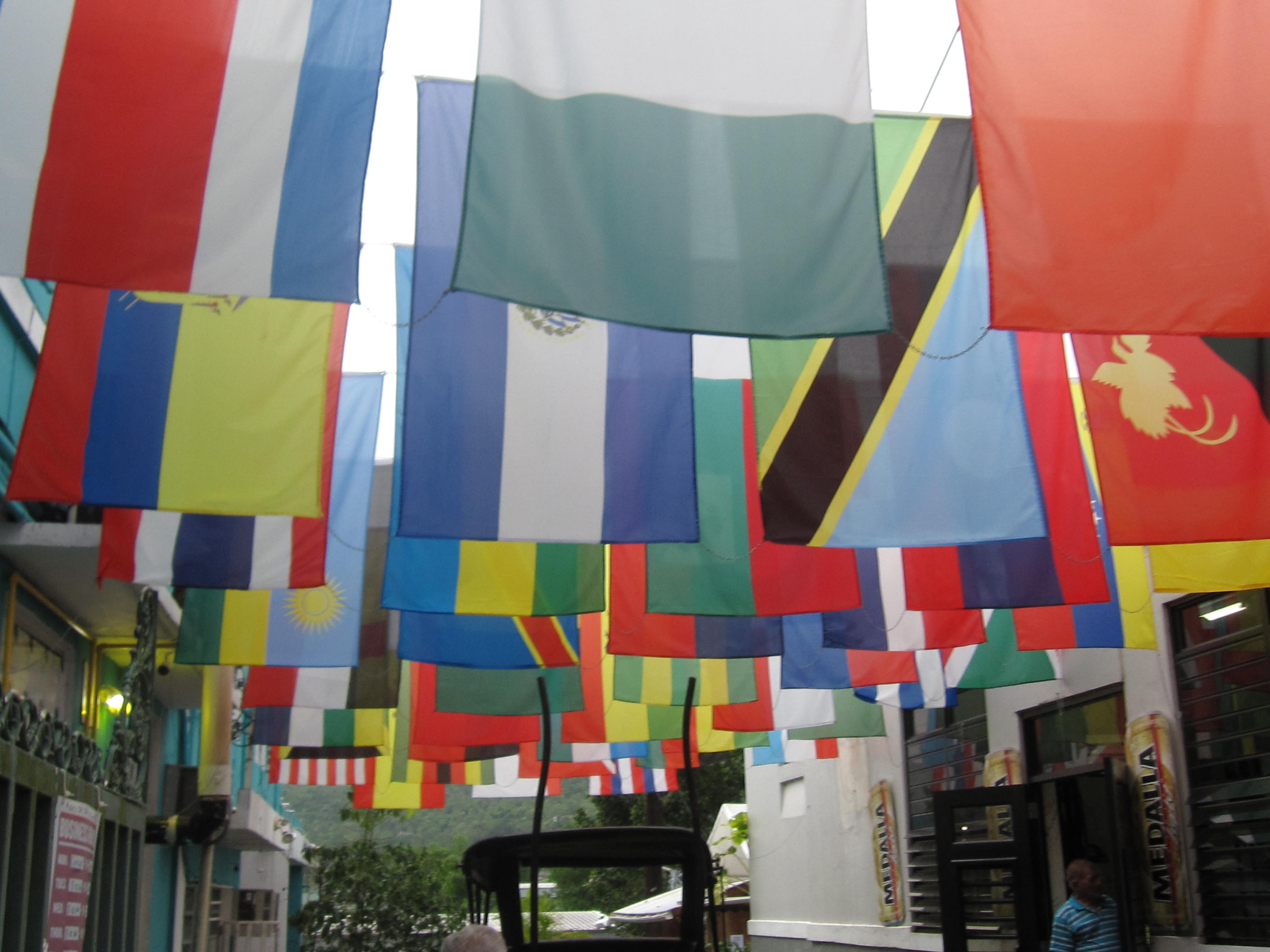
Coffee Museum in downtown Ciales

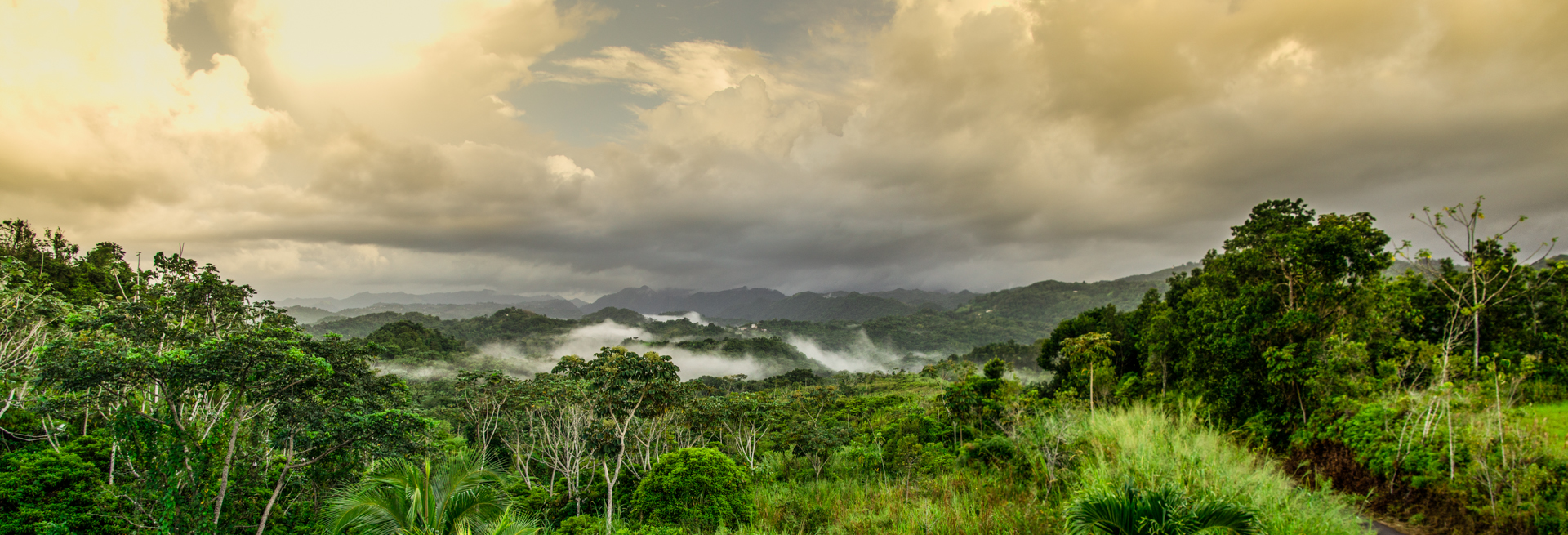
Sky with clouds above mountains in Ciales

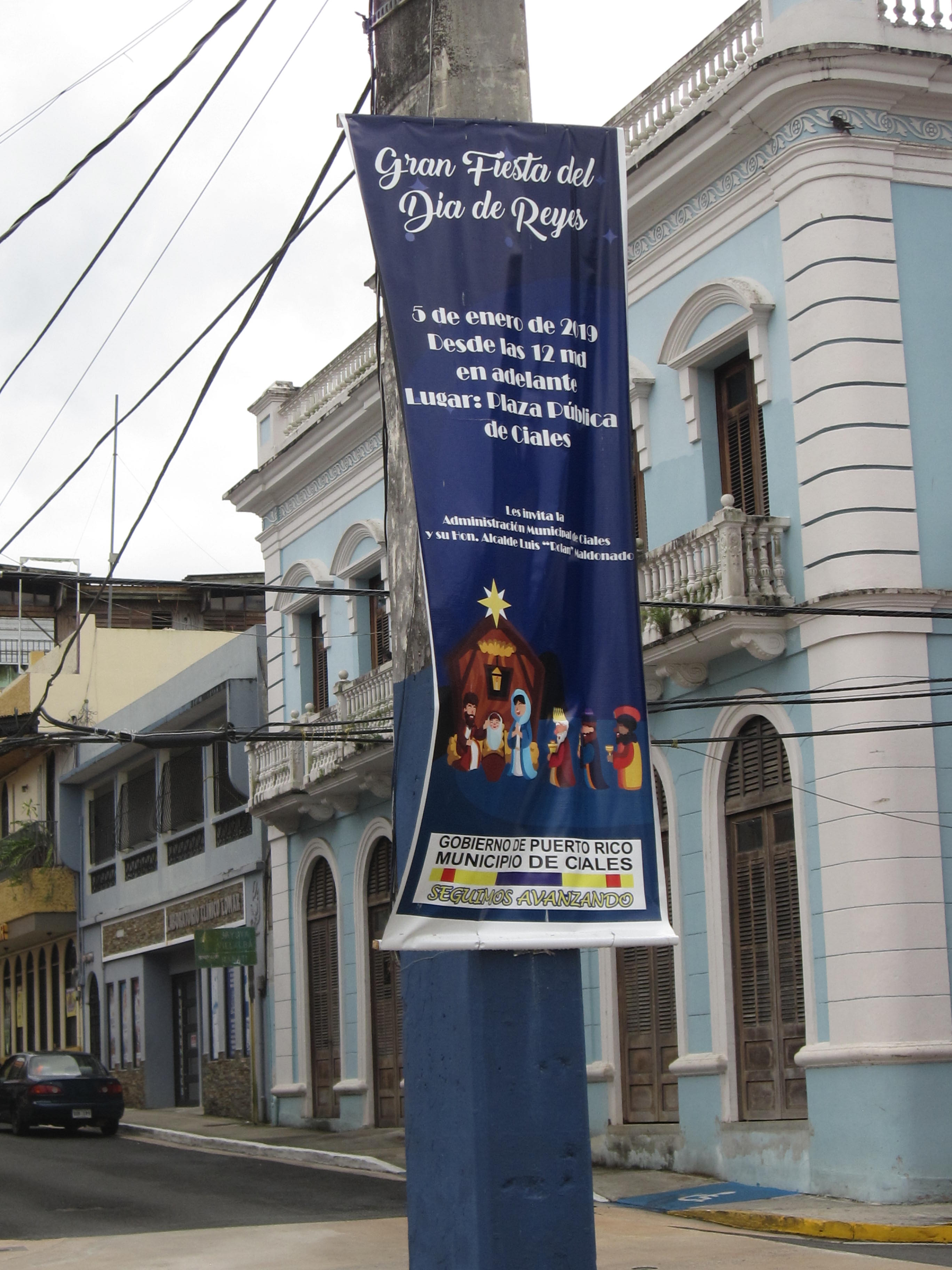
Three King's Day Festival announcement in central plaza

== See also ==
- List of Puerto Ricans
- History of Puerto Rico
- Did you know-Puerto Rico?
