= Pesas, Ciales, Puerto Rico =

Barrio of Puerto Rico

Pesas
- Barrio
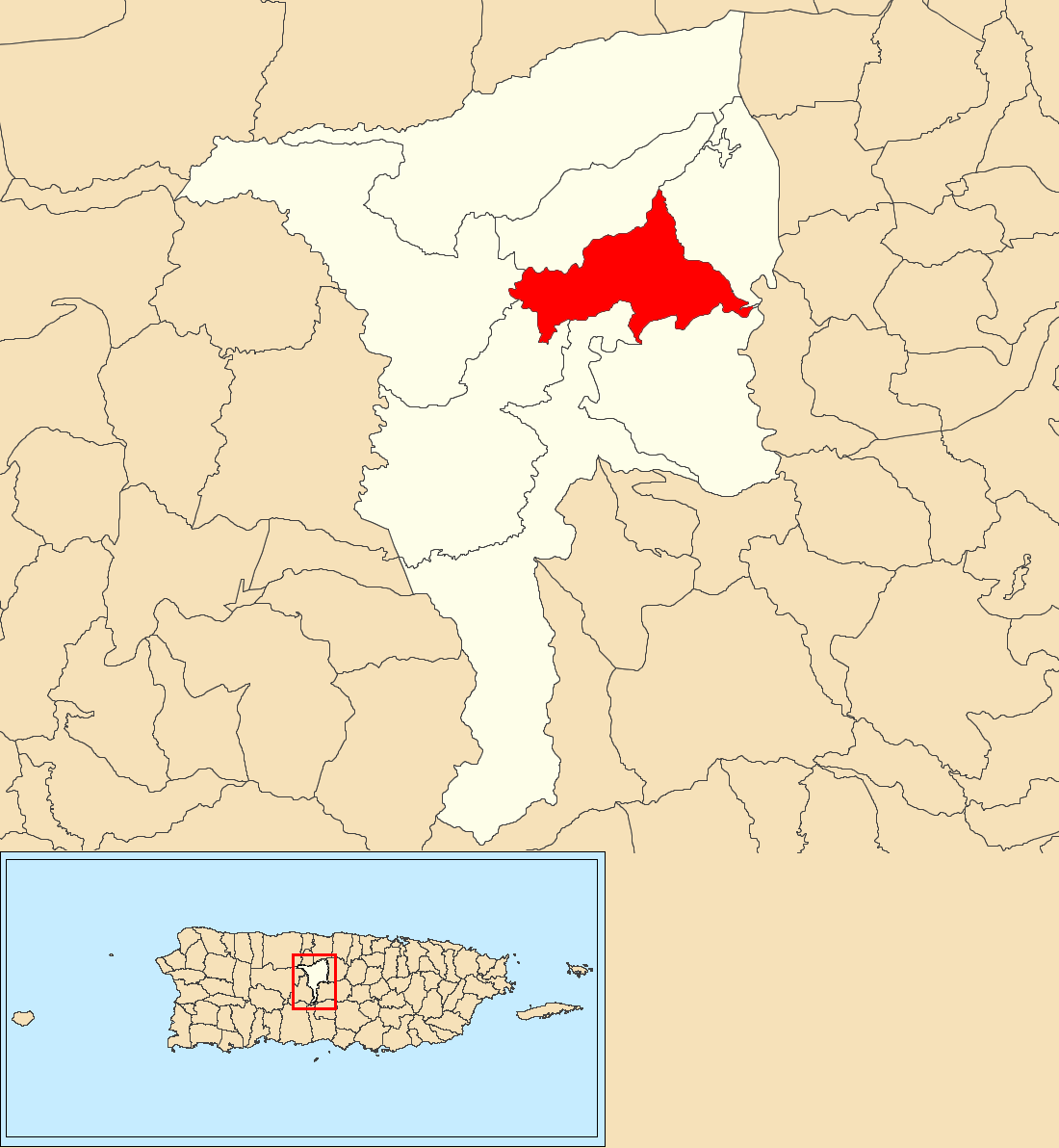
- Location of Pesas within the municipality of Ciales shown in red

- Location of Puerto Rico
- Coordinates: 18°18′08″N 66°29′24″W
- Commonwealth: Puerto Rico
- Municipality: Ciales

Area
  - Total: 4.55 sq mi (11.8 km^{2})
  - Land: 4.55 sq mi (11.8 km^{2})
  - Water: 0 sq mi (0 km^{2})
- Elevation: 1,096 ft (334 m)

Population (2010)
  - Total: 2,361
  - Density: 518.9/sq mi (200.3/km^{2})
- Source: 2010 Census
- Time zone: UTC−4 (AST)
- ZIP Code: 00638
- Area code: 787/939

Pesas is a barrio in the municipality of Ciales, Puerto Rico. Its population in 2010 was 2,361.

== History ==
Pesas was in Spain's gazetteers until Puerto Rico was ceded by Spain in the aftermath of the Spanish–American War under the terms of the Treaty of Paris of 1898 and became an unincorporated territory of the United States. In 1899, the United States Department of War conducted a census of Puerto Rico finding that the population of Pesas (Pesa as it was called) was 994.

Historical population
Census	Pop.	Note	%±
1900	994		—
1910	1,065		7.1%
1920	1,109		4.1%
1930	1,121		1.1%
1940	1,454		29.7%
1950	2,038		40.2%
1960	1,819		−10.7%
1970	1,372		−24.6%
1980	1,693		23.4%
1990	1,803		6.5%
2000	2,067		14.6%
2010	2,361		14.2%
U.S. Decennial Census; 1899 (shown as 1900) 1910-1930; 1930-1950 1980-2000 2010

== Sectors ==
Barrios (which are, in contemporary times, roughly comparable to minor civil divisions) in turn are further subdivided into smaller local populated place areas/units called sectores (sectors in English). The types of sectores may vary, from normally sector to urbanización to reparto to barriada to residencial, among others.

The following sectors are in Pesas barrio:

Parcelas María, Sector Capilla, Sector Cerro Gordo, Sector La Cuarta, Sector Las Cañas, Sector Los Arocho, Sector Los Cruz, Sector Peñonales, Sector Puente, Sector Tortuguero, and Urbanización Los Llanos.

== See also ==
- List of communities in Puerto Rico
- List of barrios and sectors of Ciales, Puerto Rico
