= Ciales barrio-pueblo =

Historical and administrative center (seat) of Ciales, Puerto Rico

Ciales barrio-pueblo Pueblo de Ciales
- Municipality Seat
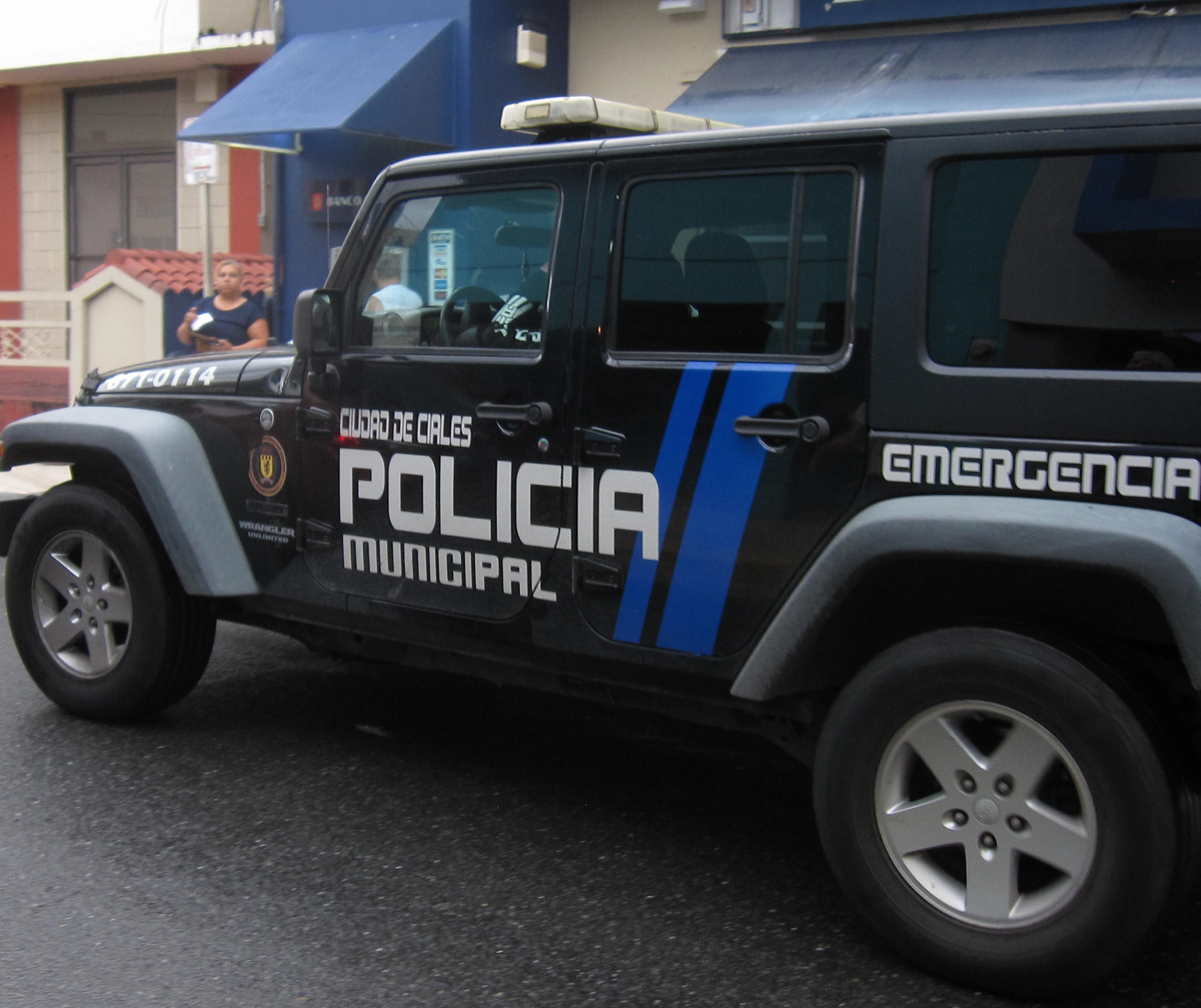
- Ciales Police Car

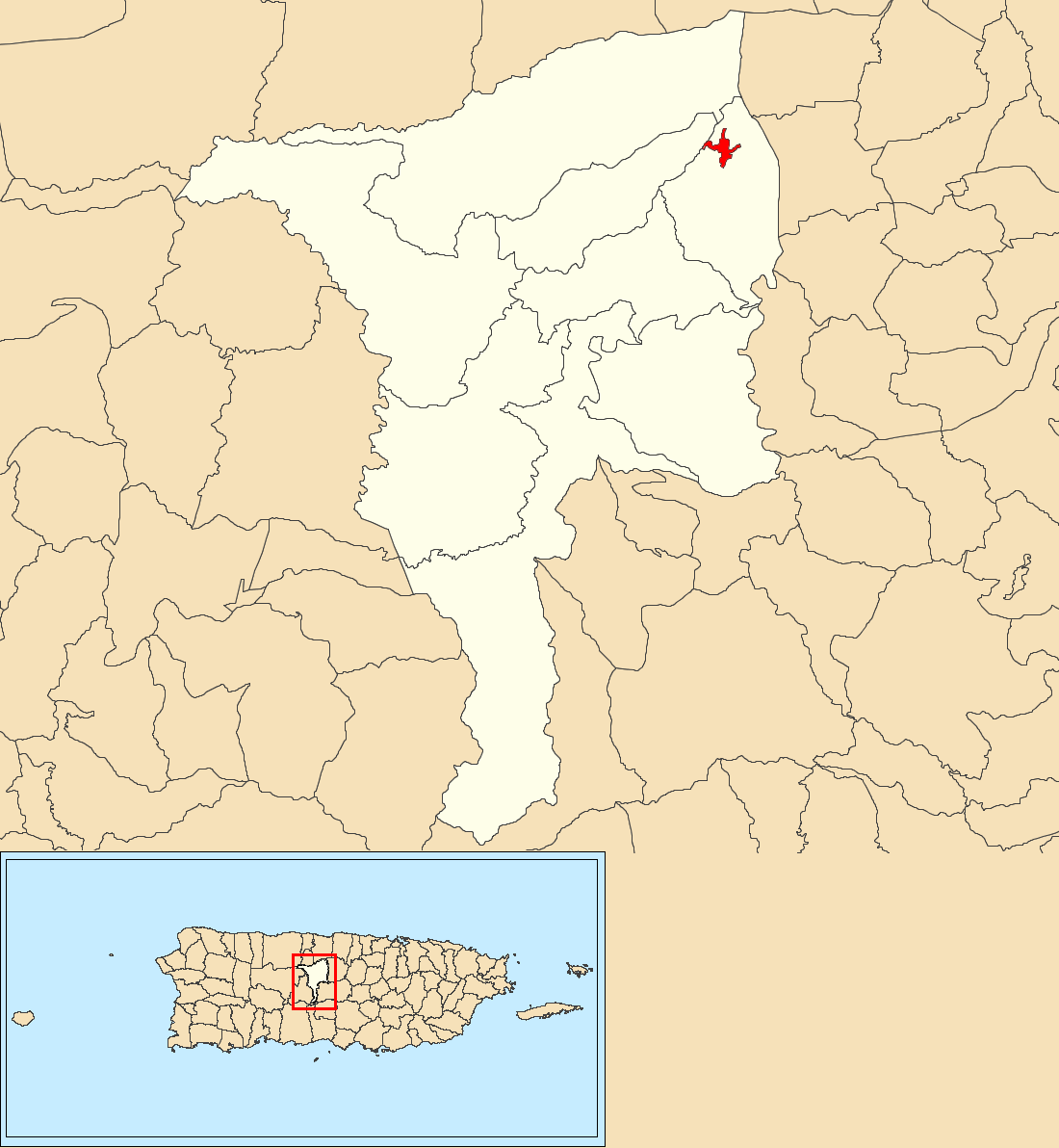
- Location of Ciales barrio-pueblo within the municipality of Ciales shown in red

- Location of Puerto Rico
- Coordinates: 18°20′10″N 66°28′08″W
- Commonwealth: Puerto Rico
- Municipality: Ciales

Area
  - Total: 0.11 sq mi (0.28 km^{2})
  - Land: 0.11 sq mi (0.28 km^{2})
  - Water: 0 sq mi (0 km^{2})
- Elevation: 302 ft (92 m)

Population (2010)
  - Total: 1,009
  - Density: 9,172.7/sq mi (3,541.6/km^{2})
- Source: 2010 Census
- Time zone: UTC−4 (AST)
- ZIP Code: 00638
- Area code: 787/939

Ciales barrio-pueblo is a barrio and the administrative center (seat) of Ciales, a municipality of Puerto Rico. Its population in 2010 was 1,009.

As was customary in Spain, in Puerto Rico, the municipality has a barrio called pueblo which contains a central plaza, the municipal buildings (city hall), and a Catholic church. Fiestas patronales (patron saint festivals) are held in the central plaza every year.

== The central plaza and its church ==
The central plaza, or square, is a place for official and unofficial recreational events and a place where people can gather and socialize from dusk to dawn. The Laws of the Indies, Spanish law, which regulated life in Puerto Rico in the early 19th century, stated the plaza's purpose was for "the parties" (celebrations, festivities) (Spanish: a propósito para las fiestas), and that the square should be proportionally large enough for the number of neighbors (Spanish: grandeza proporcionada al número de vecinos). These Spanish regulations also stated that the streets nearby should be comfortable portals for passersby, protecting them from the elements: sun and rain.

Located across the central plaza on Calle Betances in Camuy barrio-pueblo is the Parroquia Nuestra Señora del Rosario, a Roman Catholic church. By 1820 there was a wooden church at the site. A church made of masonry walls was built in 1895 and demolished in 1959. The current church was inaugurated in 1963.

San Juan Nepomuceno is the patron saint of Ciales. Ciales celebrates its patron saint festival in October. The Fiestas Patronales de Nuestra Señora del Rosario y San Jose is a religious and cultural celebration that generally features parades, games, artisans, amusement rides, regional food, and live entertainment.

== History ==
Ciales barrio-pueblo was in Spain's gazetteers until Puerto Rico was ceded by Spain in the aftermath of the Spanish–American War under the terms of the Treaty of Paris of 1898 and became an unincorporated territory of the United States. In 1899, the United States Department of War conducted a census of Puerto Rico finding that the population of Ciales barrio-pueblo was 1,356.

Historical population
Census	Pop.	Note	%±
1900	1,356		—
1910	1,683		24.1%
1920	2,238		33.0%
1930	1,780		−20.5%
1940	1,919		7.8%
1950	3,482		81.4%
1960	3,275		−5.9%
1970	0		−100.0%
1980	1,428		—
1990	1,360		−4.8%
2000	1,211		−11.0%
2010	1,009		−16.7%
U.S. Decennial Census; 1899 (shown as 1900) 1910-1930; 1930-1950 1980-2000 2010

== Sectors ==
Barrios (which are, in contemporary times, roughly comparable to minor civil divisions) in turn are further subdivided into smaller local populated place areas/units called sectores (sectors in English). The types of sectores may vary, from normally sector to urbanización to reparto to barriada to residencial, among others.

The following sectors are in Ciales barrio-pueblo:

Barriada La Aldea, Barriada La Cuerda, Barriada Otero, Barriada Santo Domingo, Barriada Verdum, Calle Morovis, Calle Nueva, Comunidad Cuba, Comunidad Los Milagros, Residencial Colinas de Jaguas, and Sector Las Guabas.

== Gallery ==
Places and views of Ciales barrio-pueblo:

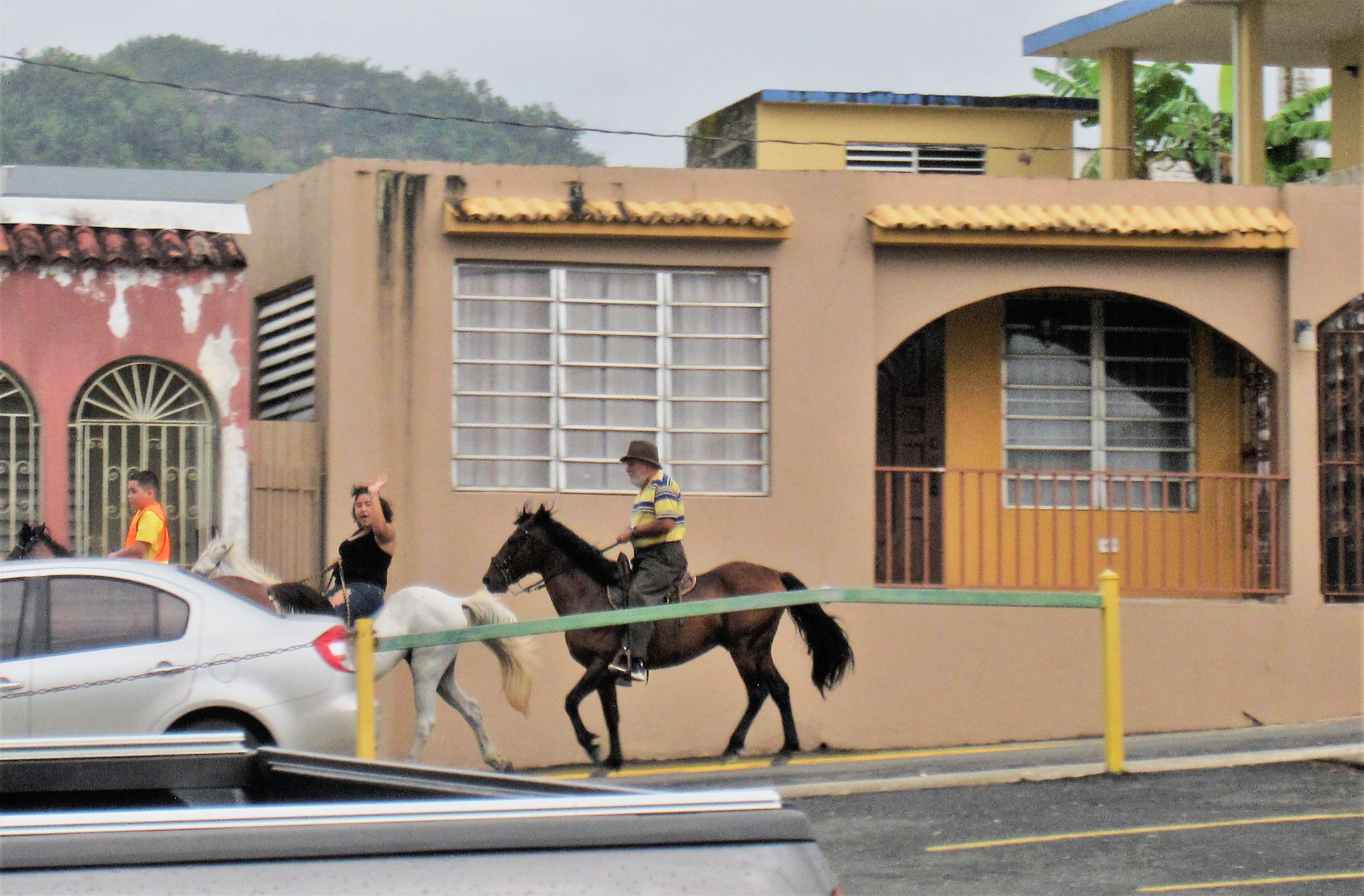
Horse-back riding

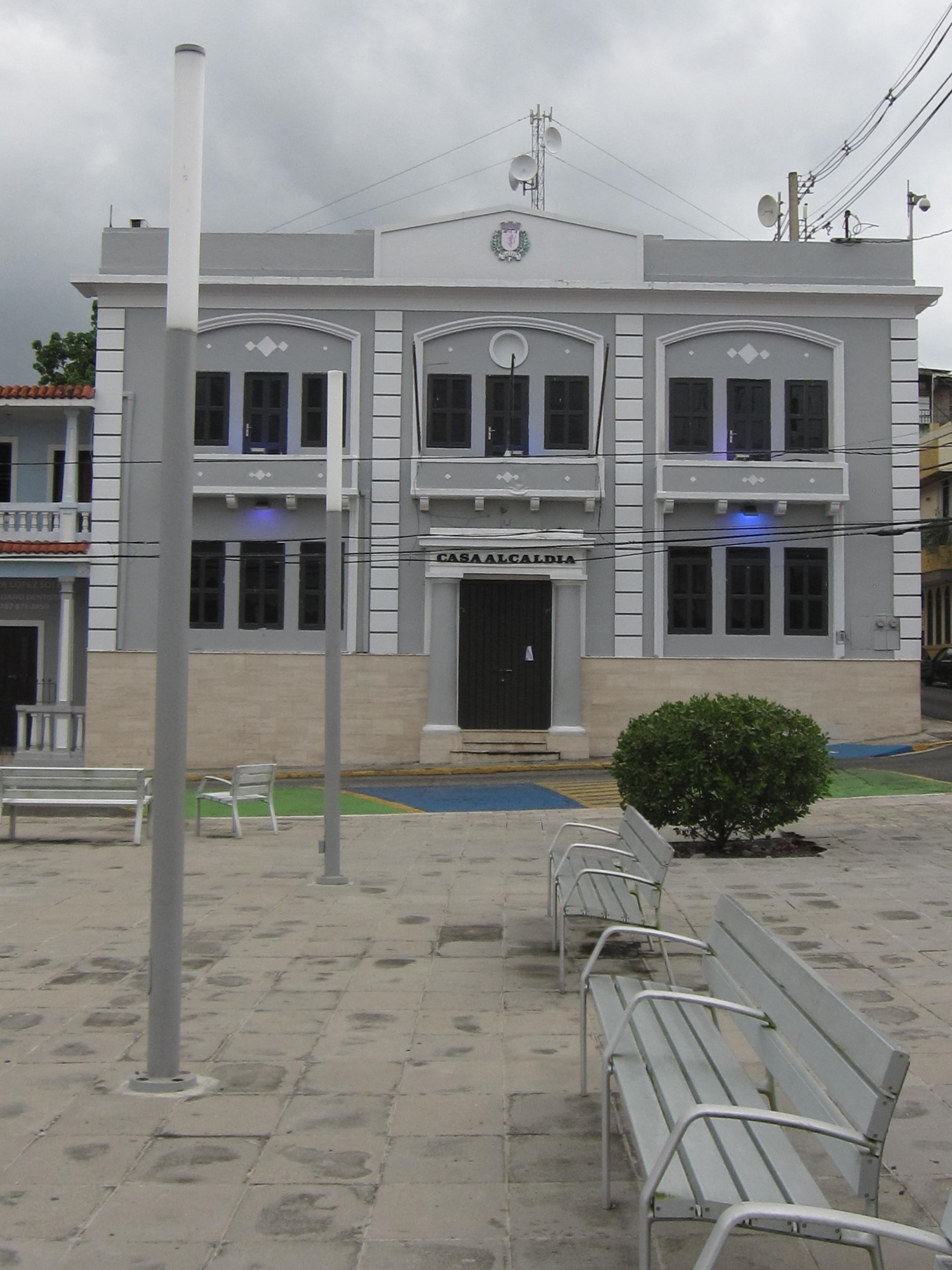
Town Hall in Ciales

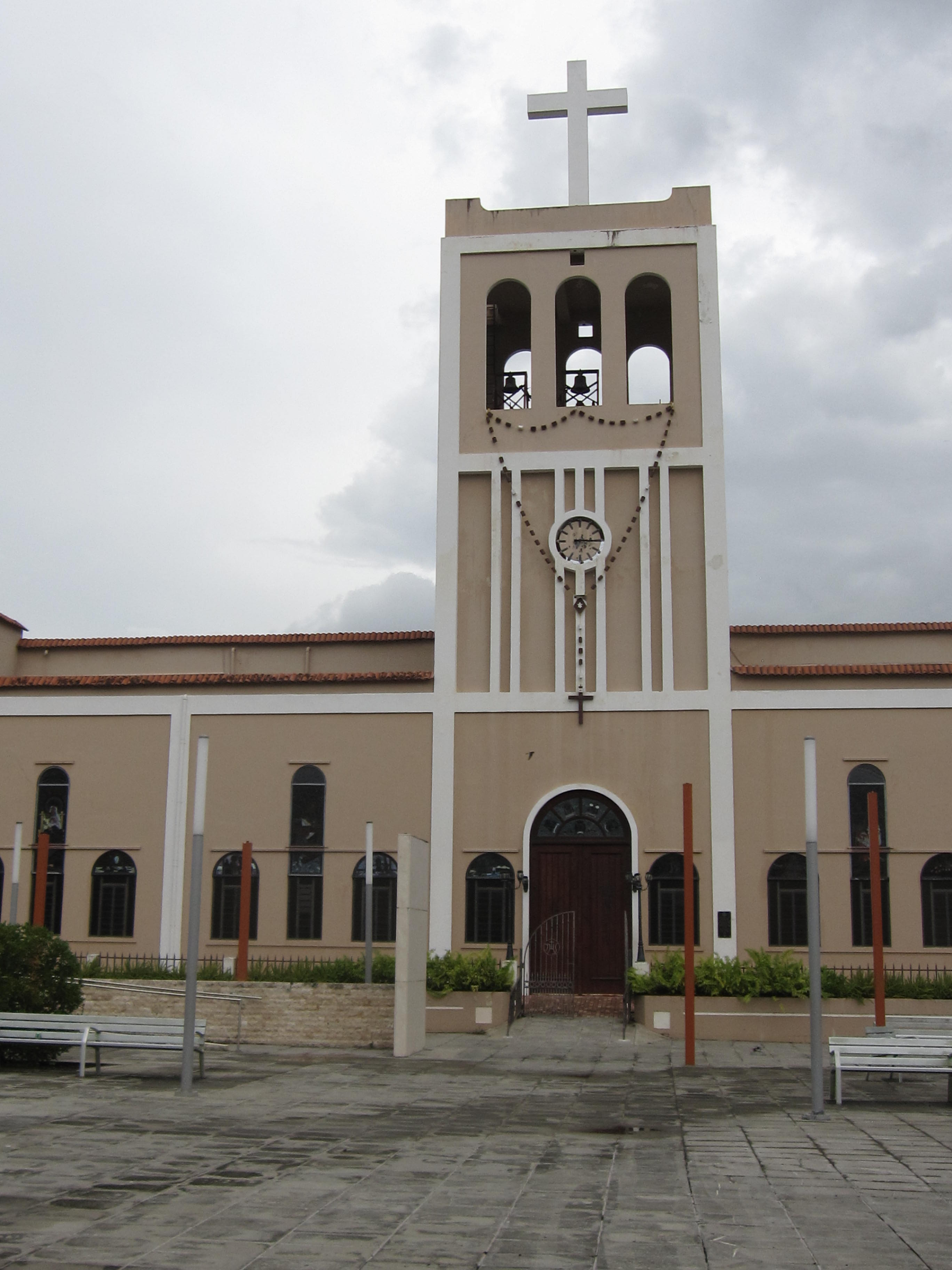
Catholic church in Ciales barrio-pueblo

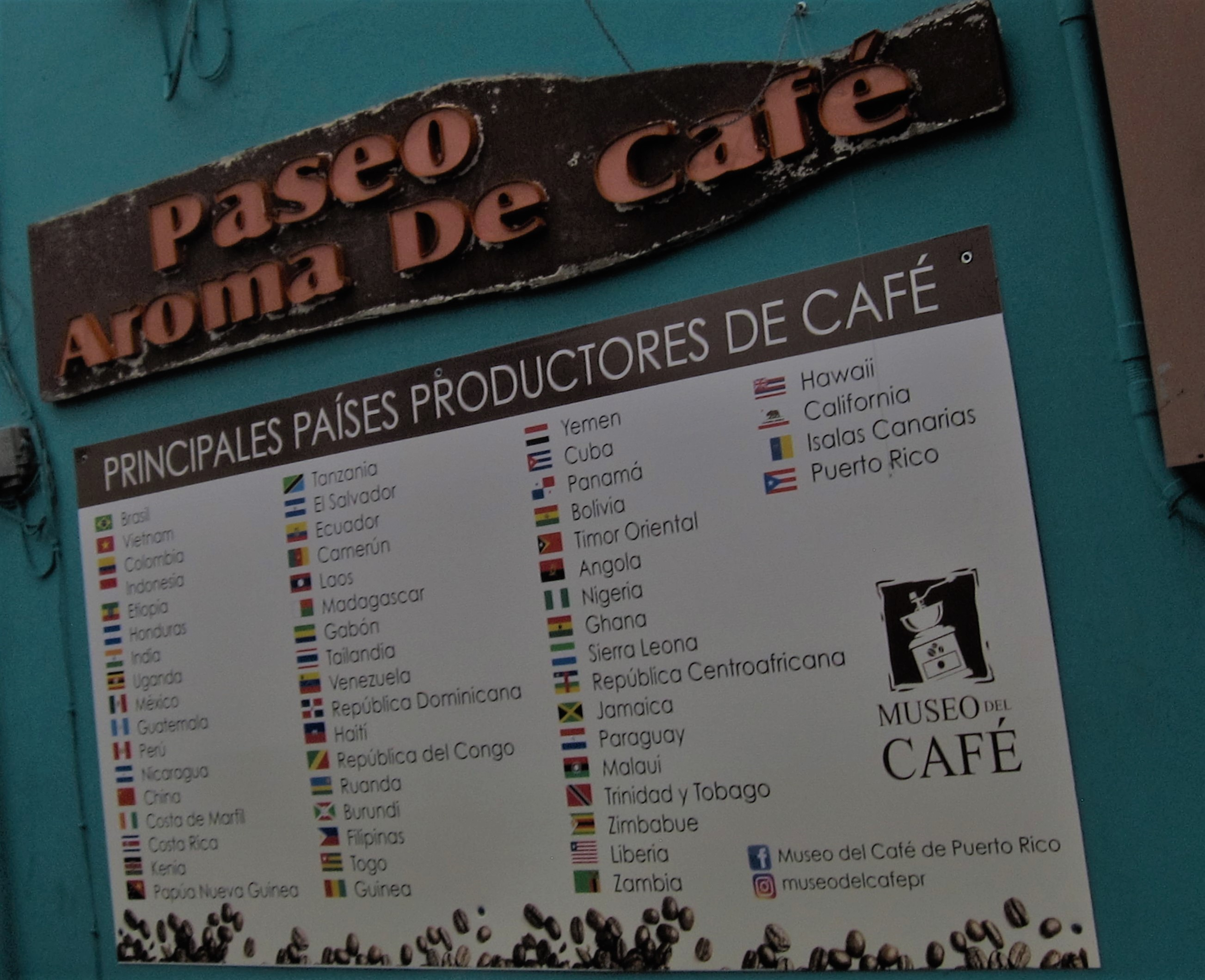
Coffee Museum Ciales

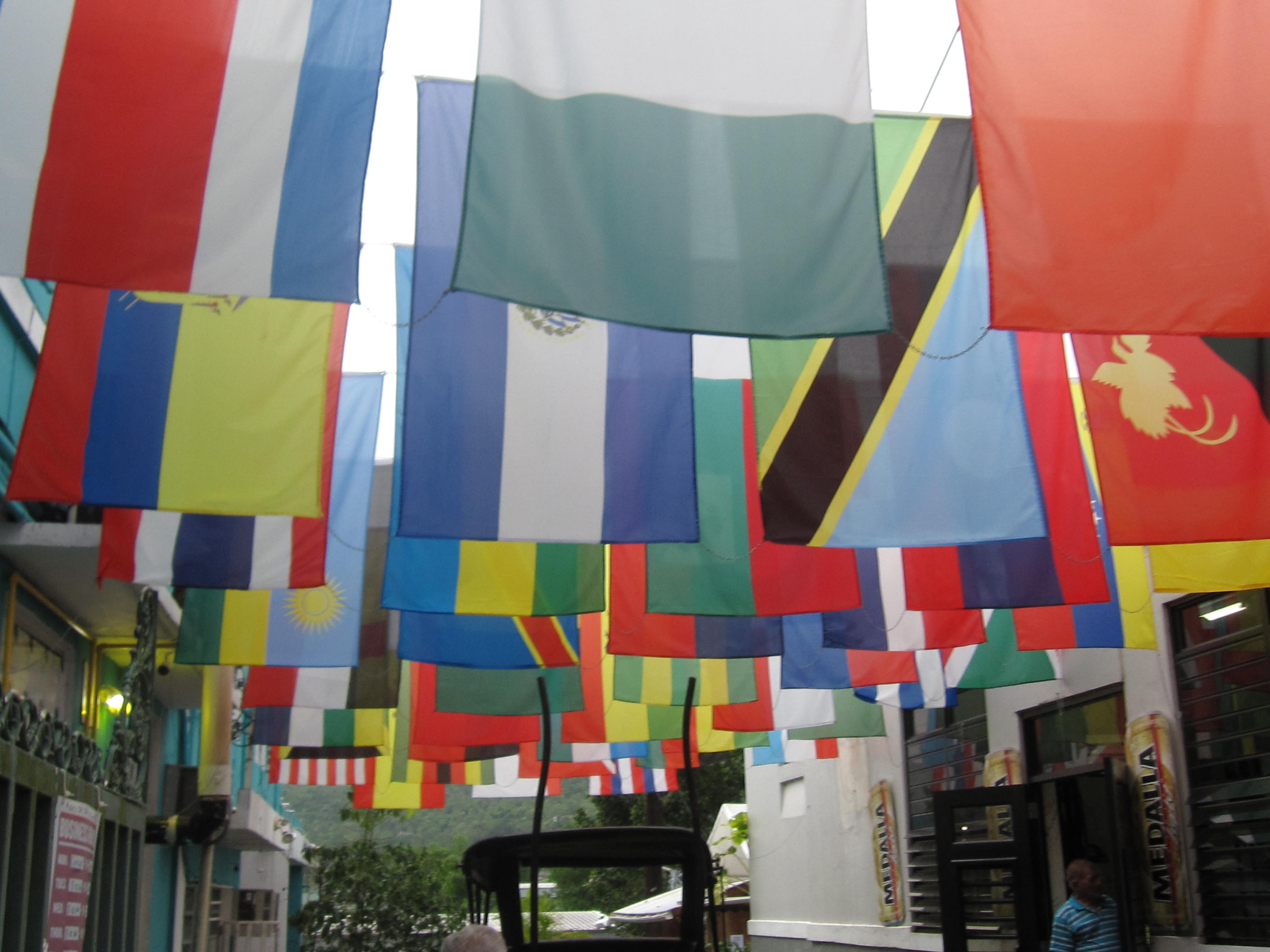
Coffee Museum

== See also ==
- List of communities in Puerto Rico
- List of barrios and sectors of Ciales, Puerto Rico
