= Pozas, Ciales, Puerto Rico =

Barrio of Puerto Rico

Pozas
- Barrio
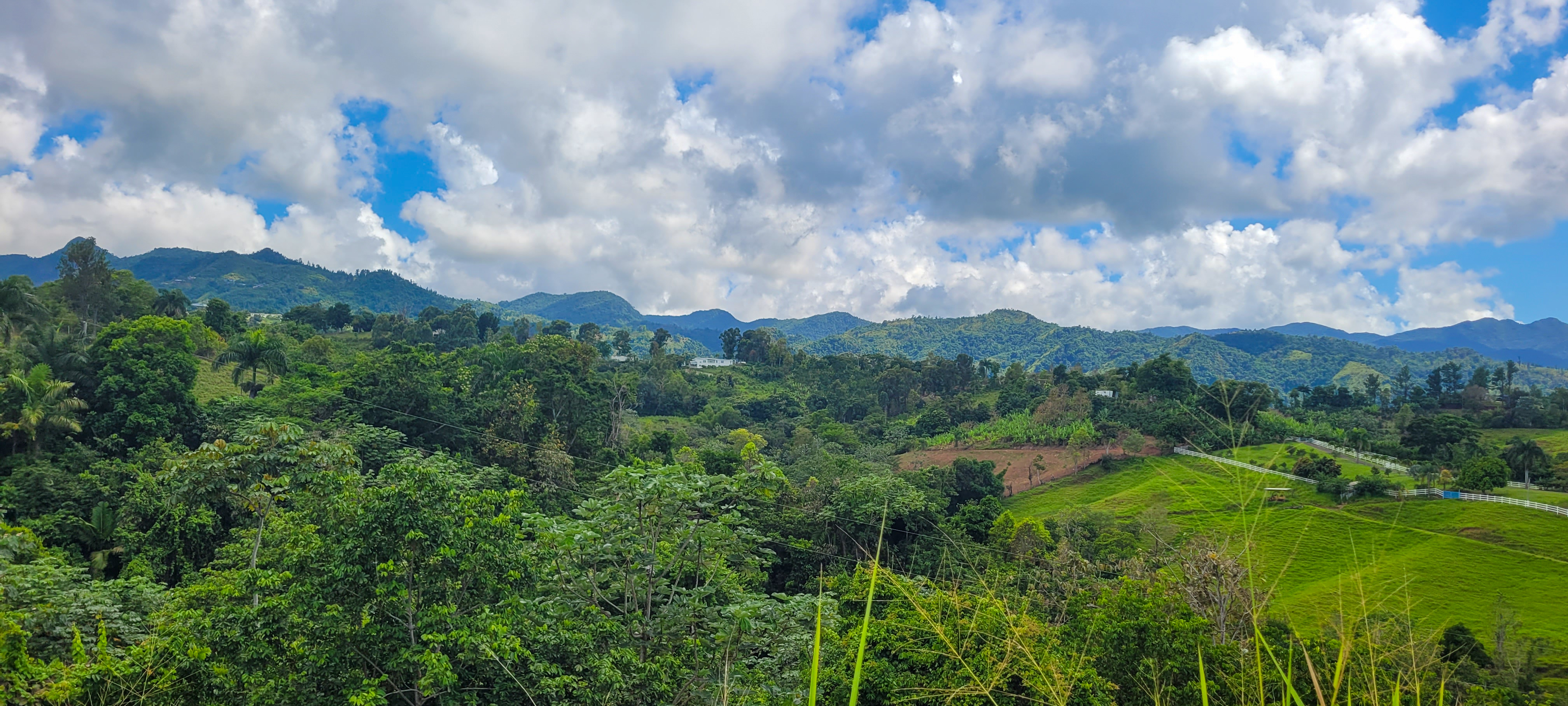
- View of Orocovis mountains from Pozas

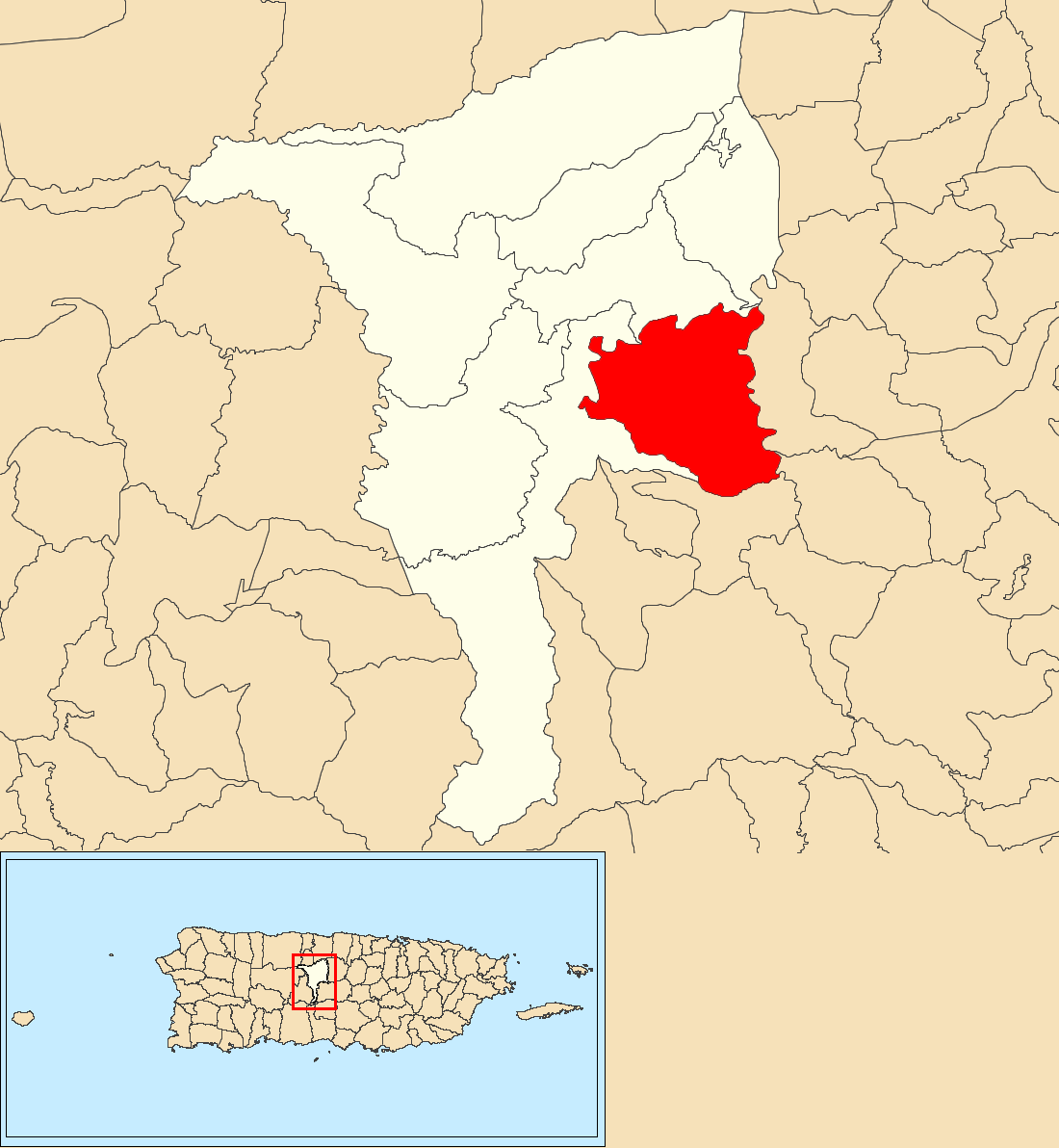
- Location of Pozas within the municipality of Ciales shown in red

- Location of Puerto Rico
- Coordinates: 18°16′17″N 66°28′39″W
- Commonwealth: Puerto Rico
- Municipality: Ciales

Area
  - Total: 7.03 sq mi (18.2 km^{2})
  - Land: 7.03 sq mi (18.2 km^{2})
  - Water: 0 sq mi (0 km^{2})
- Elevation: 1,122 ft (342 m)

Population (2010)
  - Total: 1,430
  - Density: 203.4/sq mi (78.5/km^{2})
- Source: 2010 Census
- Time zone: UTC−4 (AST)
- ZIP Code: 00638
- Area code: 787/939

Pozas is a barrio in the municipality of Ciales, Puerto Rico. Its population in 2010 was 1,430.

== History ==
Pozas was in Spain's gazetteers until Puerto Rico was ceded by Spain in the aftermath of the Spanish–American War under the terms of the Treaty of Paris of 1898 and became an unincorporated territory of the United States. In 1899, the United States Department of War conducted a census of Puerto Rico finding that the population of Pozas barrio was 2,796.

Historical population
Census	Pop.	Note	%±
1900	2,796		—
1910	2,705		−3.3%
1920	2,719		0.5%
1930	2,558		−5.9%
1940	2,880		12.6%
1950	1,987		−31.0%
1960	1,975		−0.6%
1970	1,529		−22.6%
1980	1,316		−13.9%
1990	1,406		6.8%
2000	1,503		6.9%
2010	1,430		−4.9%
U.S. Decennial Census; 1899 (shown as 1900) 1910-1930; 1930-1950 1980-2000 2010

== Sectors ==
Barrios (which are, in contemporary times, roughly comparable to minor civil divisions) in turn are further subdivided into smaller local populated place areas/units called sectores (sectors in English). The types of sectores may vary, from normally sector to urbanización to reparto to barriada to residencial, among others.

The following sectors are in Pozas barrio:

Sector Blacho, Sector Cascana, Sector Capilla, Sector Cuesta Mata, Sector El Cedro, Sector El Gundo, Sector El Hoyo, Sector Frontera, Sector Las Lomas, Sector Llanadas, Sector Manicaboa, and Sector Villanueva.

== See also ==
- List of communities in Puerto Rico
- List of barrios and sectors of Ciales, Puerto Rico
