= WMNT =

WMNT may refer to:

- WMNT (AM), a radio station (1500 AM) licensed to Manati, Puerto Rico
- WMNT-CD, a low-power television station (channel 36, virtual 48) licensed to Toledo, Ohio, United States
