= Manatí barrio-pueblo =

Historical and administrative center (seat) of Manatí, Puerto Rico

Manatí barrio-pueblo Pueblo de Manatí
- Municipality seat
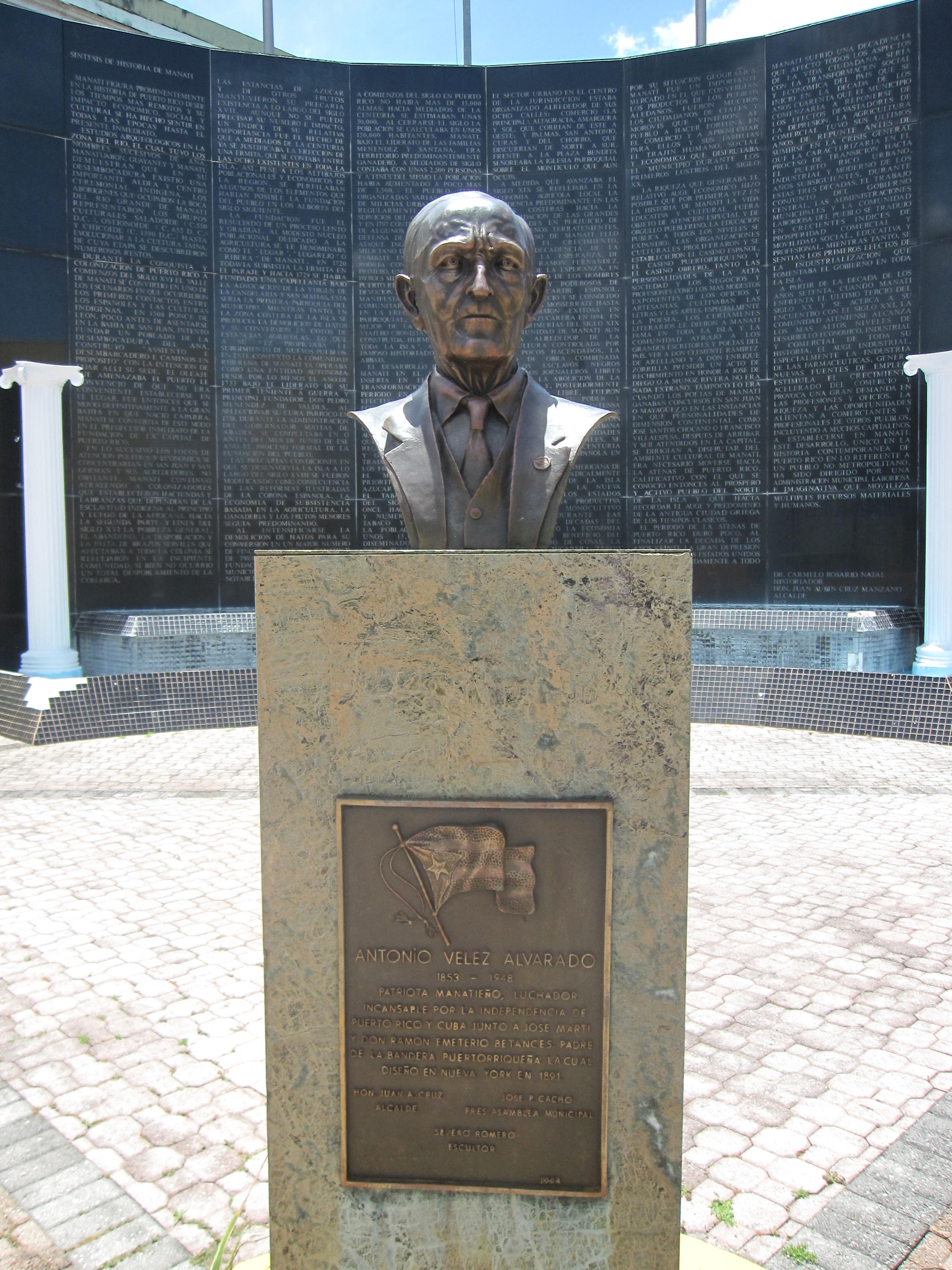
- Antonio Vélez Alvarado monument in downtown Manatí

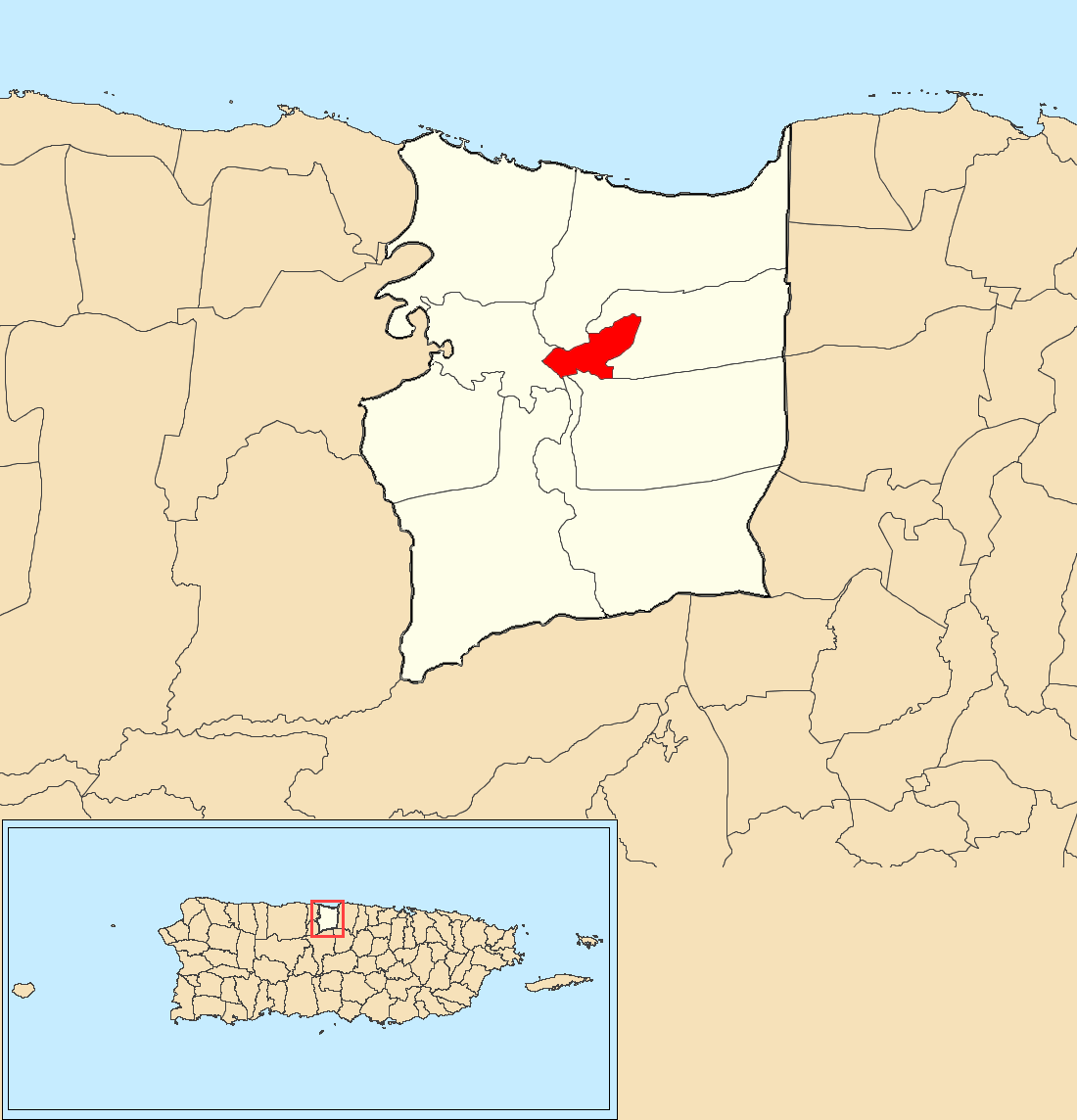
- Location of Manatí barrio-pueblo within the municipality of Manatí shown in red

- Location of Puerto Rico
- Coordinates: 18°25′54″N 66°29′11″W
- Commonwealth: Puerto Rico
- Municipality: Manatí

Area
  - Total: 0.77 sq mi (2.0 km^{2})
  - Land: 0.77 sq mi (2.0 km^{2})
  - Water: 0 sq mi (0 km^{2})
- Elevation: 115 ft (35 m)

Population (2010)
  - Total: 5,746
  - Density: 7,462.3/sq mi (2,881.2/km^{2})
- Source: 2010 Census
- Time zone: UTC−4 (AST)
- ZIP Code: 00674
- Area code: 787/939

Manatí barrio-pueblo is a barrio and the administrative center (seat) of Manatí, a municipality of Puerto Rico. Its population in 2010 was 5,746. Manatí barrio-pueblo is where the central plaza, the municipal buildings (city hall), and a Catholic church are located.

Historical population
Census	Pop.	Note	%±
1900	4,494		—
1910	4,439		−1.2%
1920	6,147		38.5%
1930	7,449		21.2%
1940	6,771		−9.1%
1950	10,092		49.0%
1960	9,682		−4.1%
1970	0		−100.0%
1980	8,352		—
1990	7,712		−7.7%
2000	7,162		−7.1%
2010	5,746		−19.8%
U.S. Decennial Census; 1899 (shown as 1900) 1910-1930; 1930-1950 1980-2000 2010

== The central plaza and its church ==
As was customary in Spain, in Puerto Rico, the municipality has a barrio called pueblo which contains a central plaza, the municipal buildings (city hall), and a Catholic church. Fiestas patronales (patron saint festivals) are held in the central plaza every year.

The central plaza, or square, is a place for official and unofficial recreational events and a place where people can gather and socialize from dusk to dawn. The Laws of the Indies, Spanish law, which regulated life in Puerto Rico in the early 19th century, stated the plaza's purpose was for "the parties" (celebrations, festivities) (Spanish: a propósito para las fiestas), and that the square should be proportionally large enough for the number of neighbors (Spanish: grandeza proporcionada al número de vecinos). These Spanish regulations also stated that the streets nearby should be comfortable portals for passersby, protecting them from the elements: sun and rain.

Located across the central plaza in Manatí barrio-pueblo is the Parroquia Nuestra Señora de la Candelaria y San Matías Apostol which was built in 1729 and renovated many times since. There was a humble church there by 1645.

Due to its historical and architectural value, the historic downtown zone (pueblo) of Manatí was added to the Puerto Rico Register of Historic Sites and Zones (Spanish: Registro Nacional de Sitios y Zonas Históricas) on January 15, 1986.

== History ==
Manatí barrio-pueblo was in Spain's gazetteers until Puerto Rico was ceded by Spain in the aftermath of the Spanish–American War under the terms of the Treaty of Paris of 1898 and became an unincorporated territory of the United States. In 1899, the United States Department of War conducted a census of Puerto Rico in 1899 finding that the population of Manatí Pueblo was 4,494.

== Gallery ==
Scenes in Manatí Pueblo:

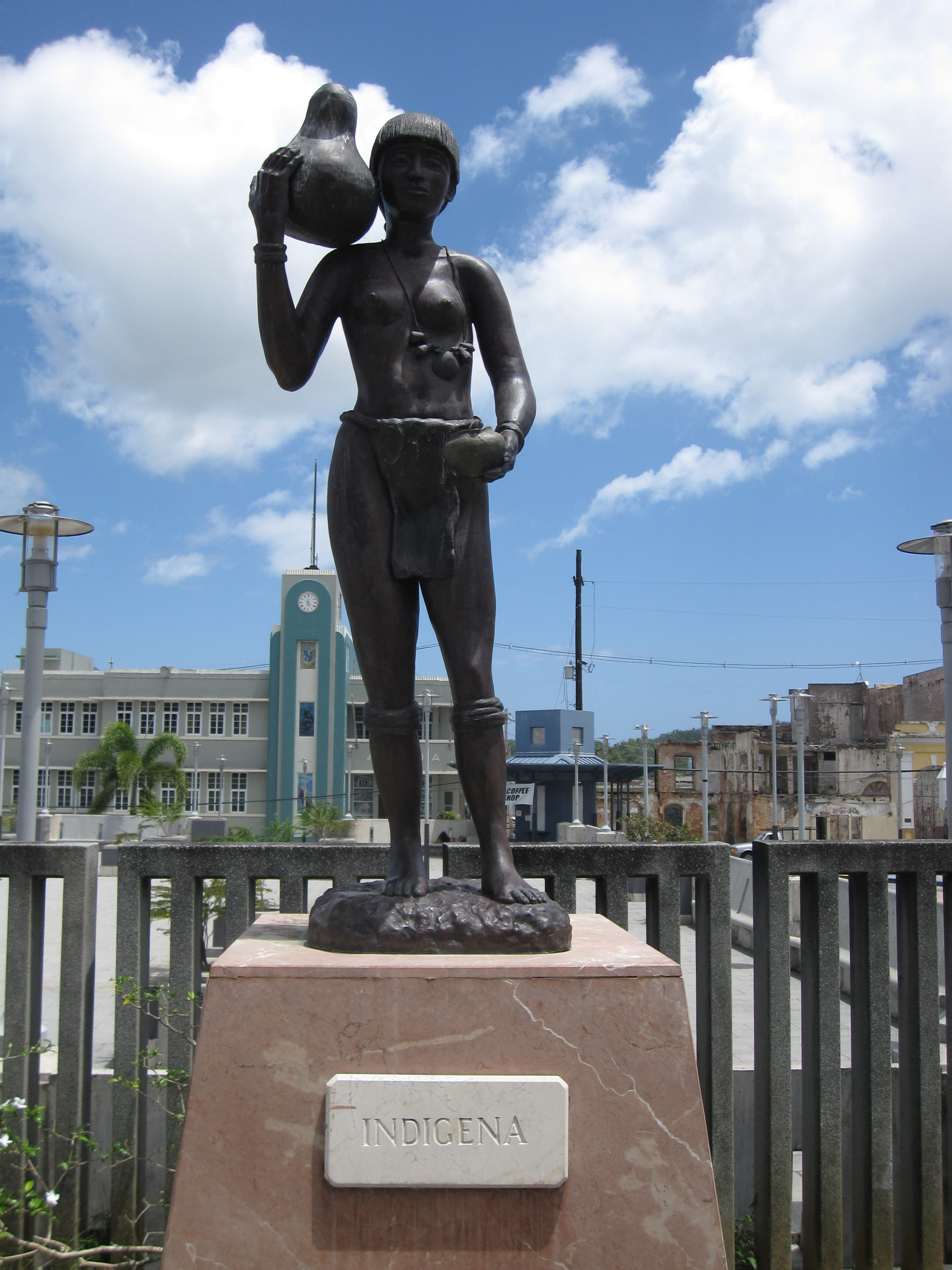
Statue of indigenous person

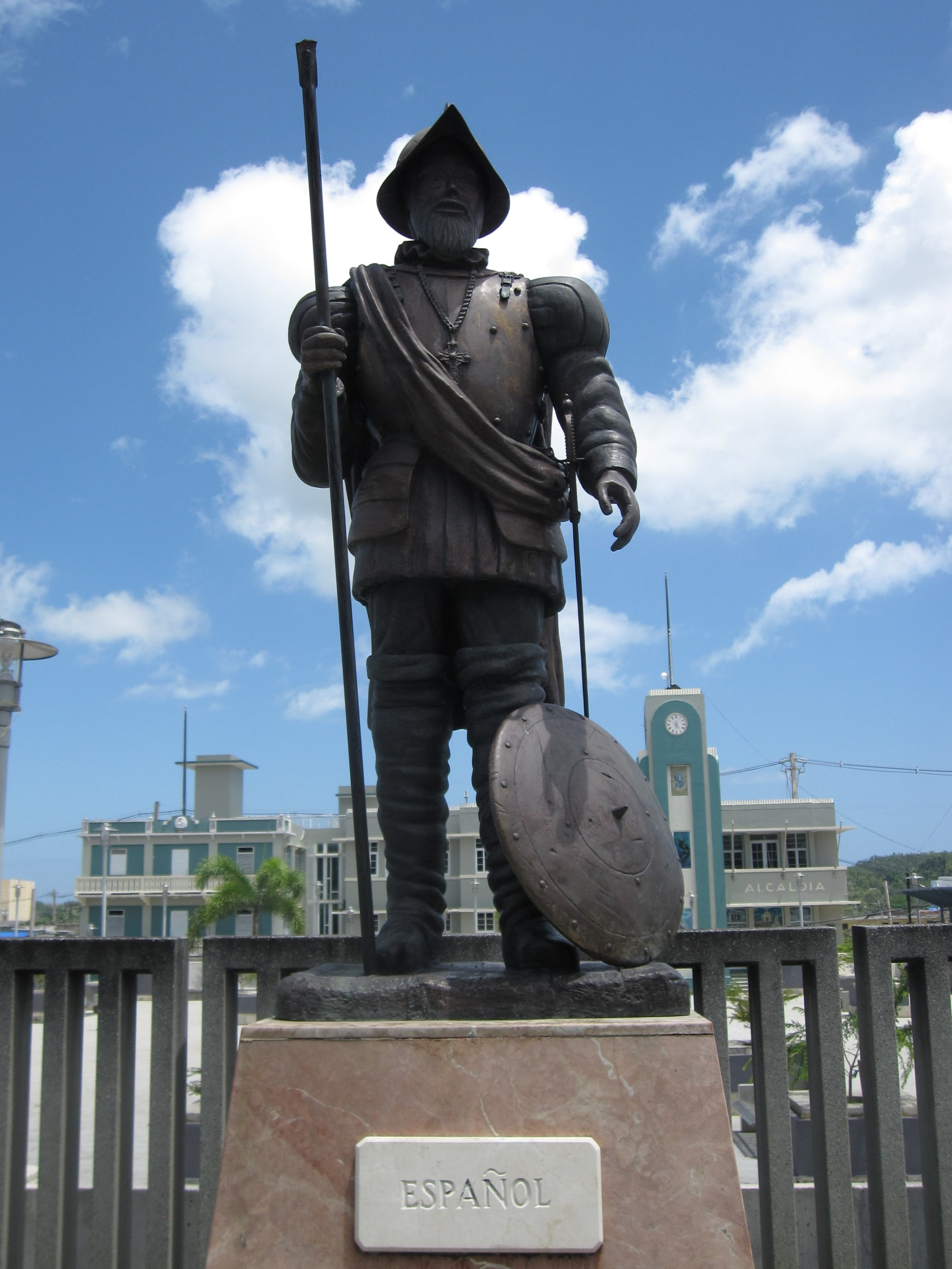
Statue of Spaniard

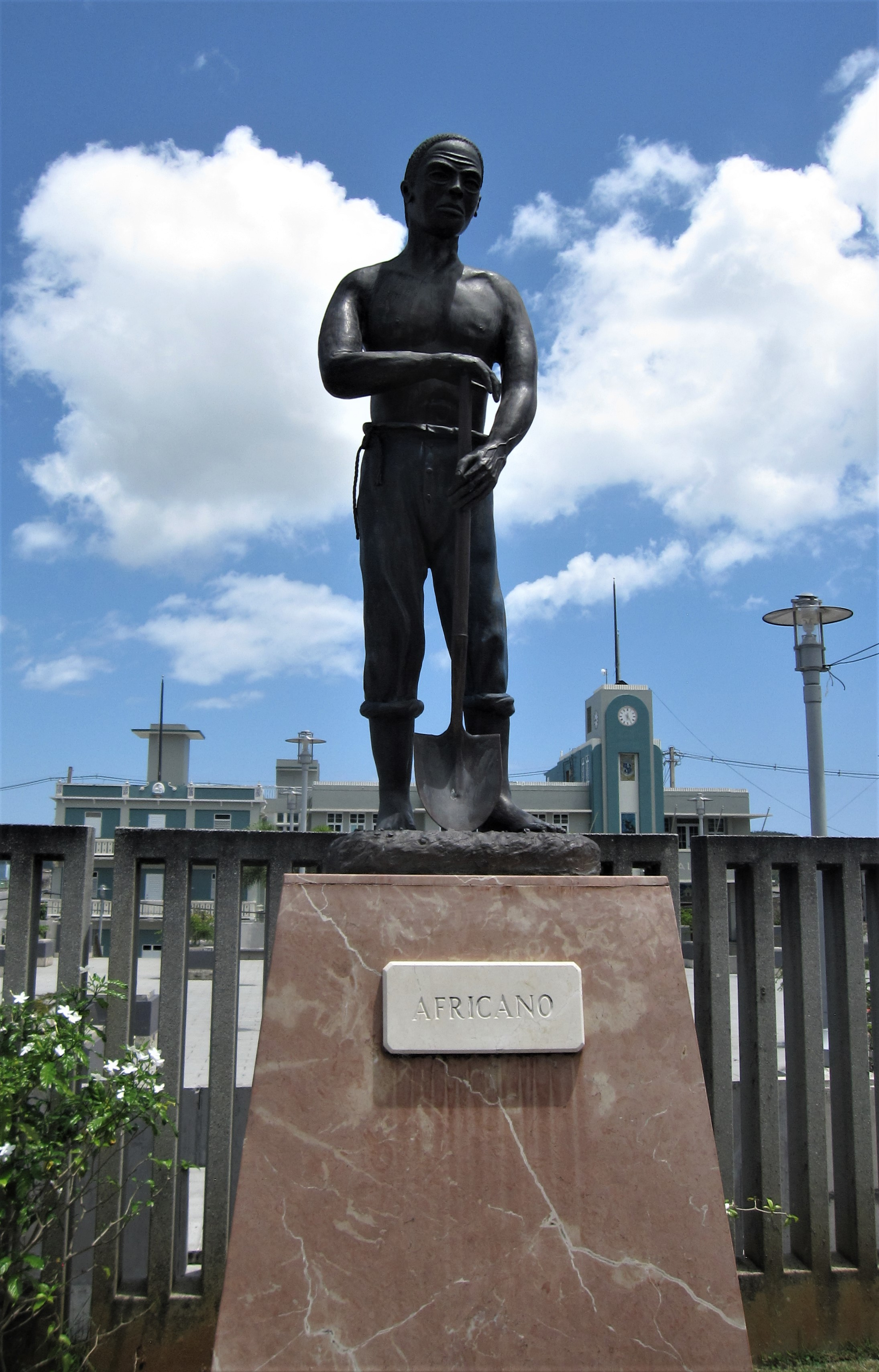
Statue of African

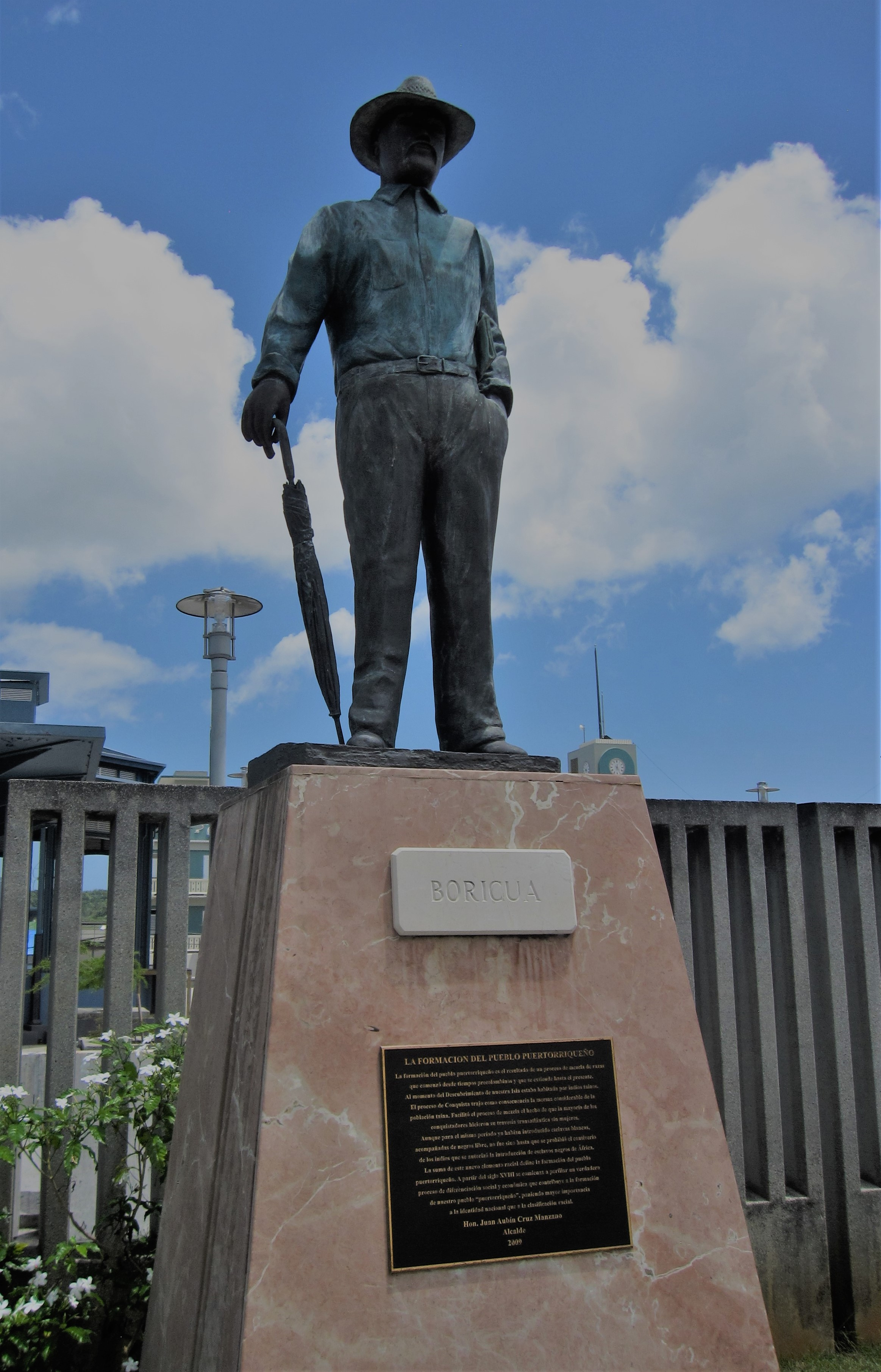
Statue of Boricua

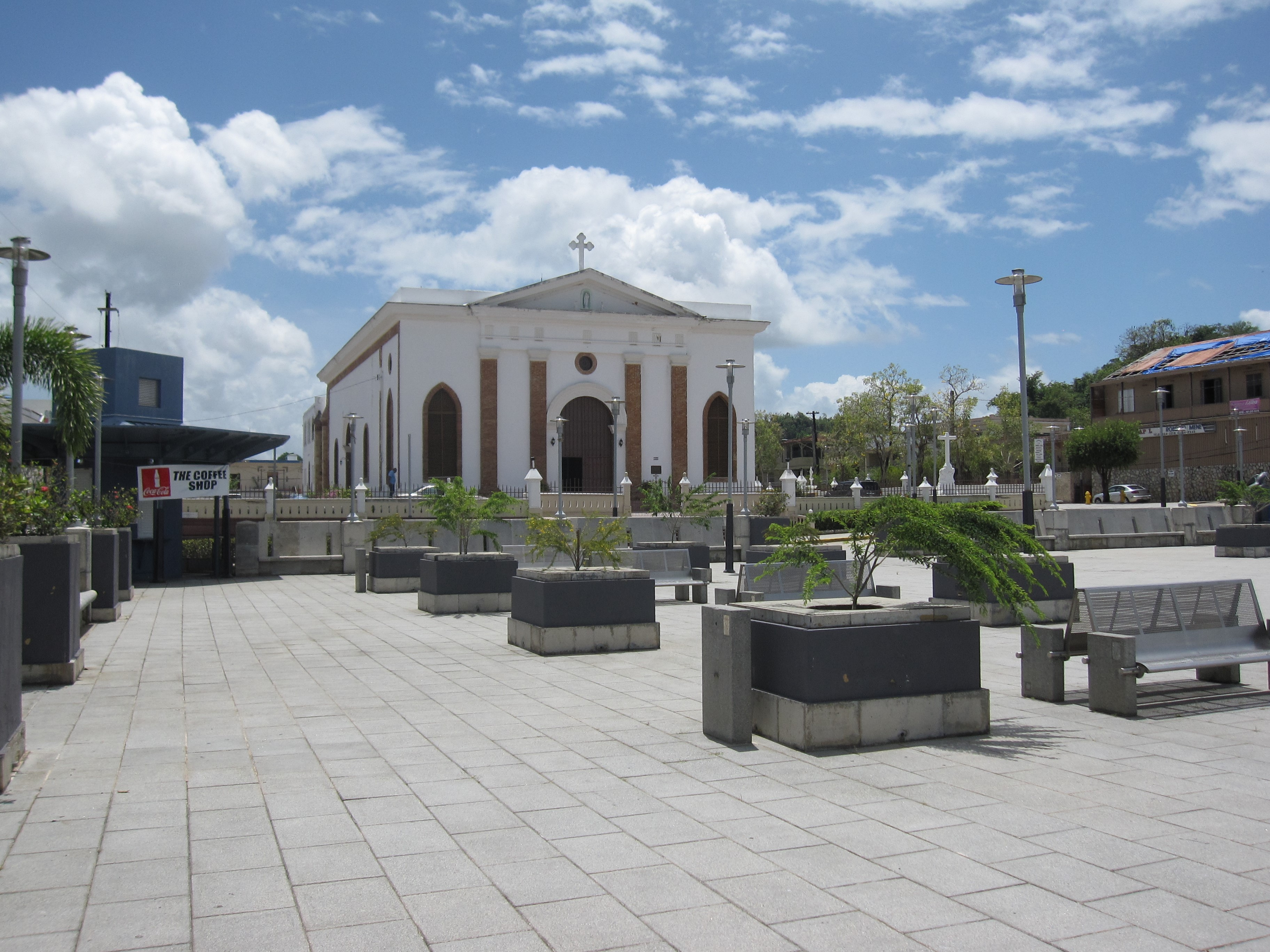
Historic church and the central plaza

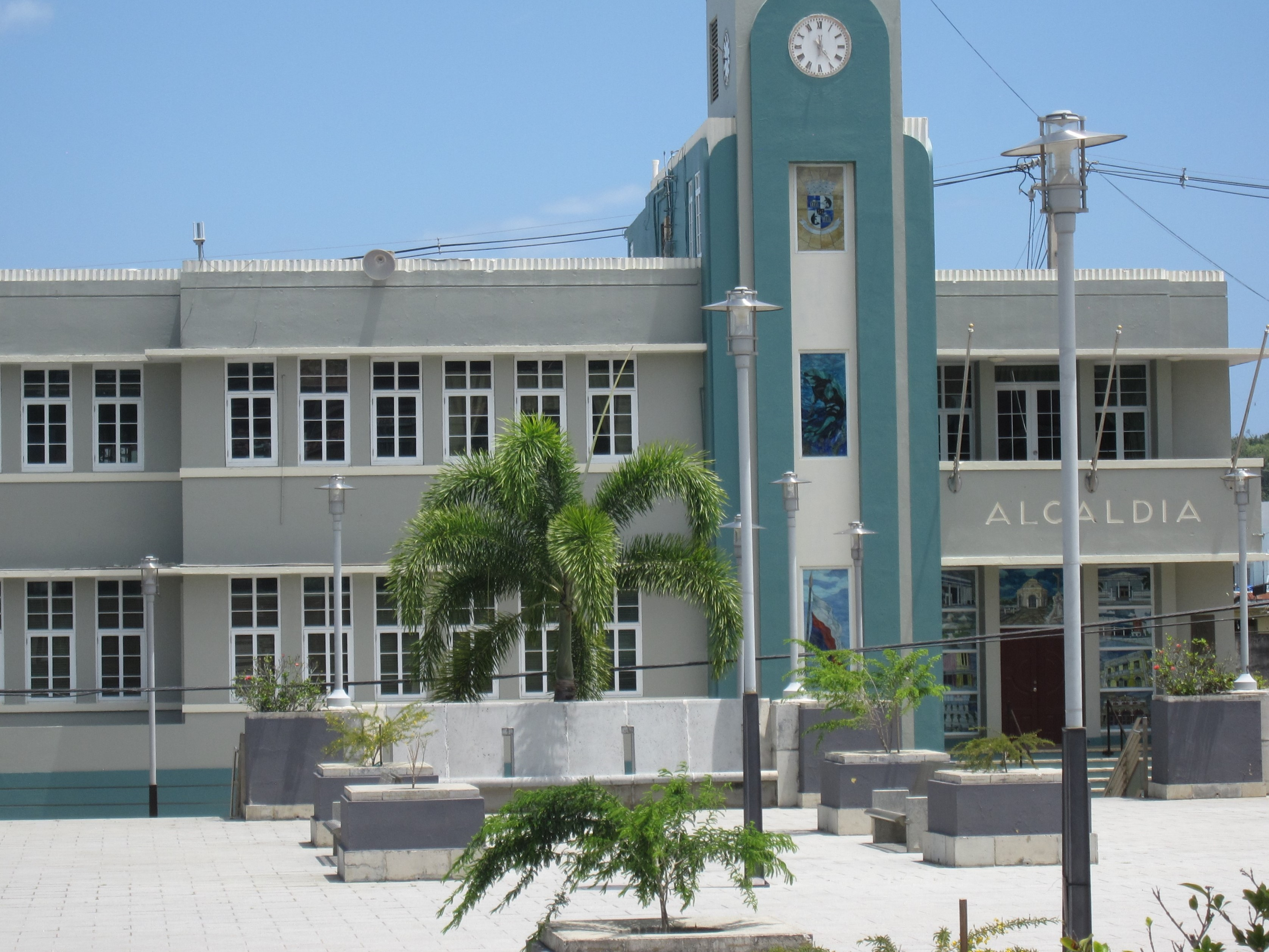
Town hall (Spanish: Alcaldía)

== See also ==
- List of communities in Puerto Rico
