= Bajura Adentro =

Barrio of Manatí, Puerto Rico

- Barrio
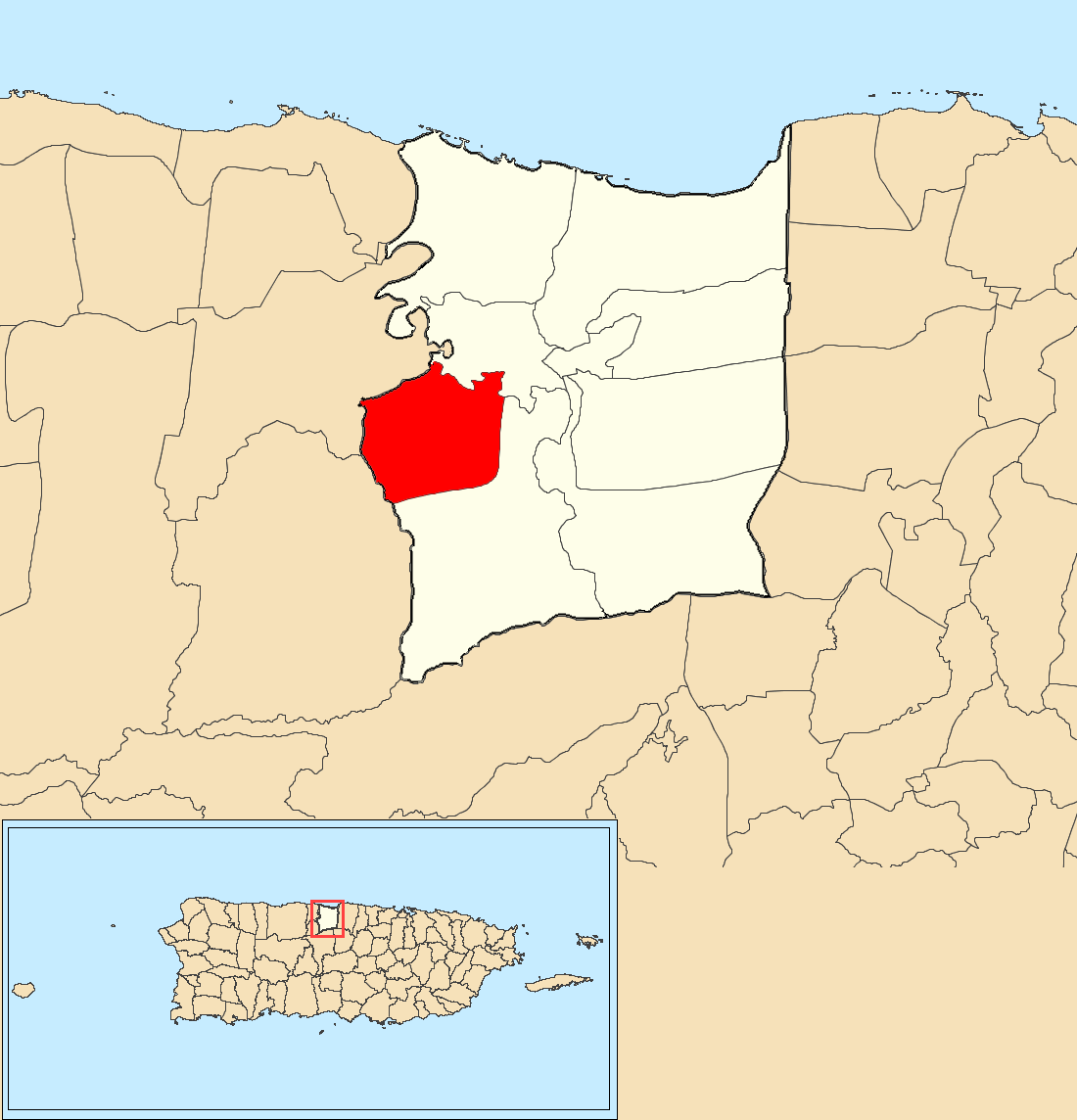
- Location of Bajura Adentro within the municipality of Manatí shown in red

- Location of Puerto Rico
- Coordinates: 18°24′20″N 66°31′15″W
- Commonwealth: Puerto Rico
- Municipality: Manatí

Area
  - Total: 3.98 sq mi (10.3 km^{2})
  - Land: 3.98 sq mi (10.3 km^{2})
  - Water: 0 sq mi (0 km^{2})
- Elevation: 384 ft (117 m)

Population (2010)
  - Total: 2,436
  - Density: 612.1/sq mi (236.3/km^{2})
- Source: 2010 Census
- Time zone: UTC−4 (AST)
- ZIP Code: 00674
- Area code: 787/939

Bajura Adentro is a rural barrio in the municipality of Manatí, Puerto Rico. Its population in 2010 was 2,436.

Historical population
Census	Pop.	Note	%±
1900	881		—
1910	1,550		75.9%
1920	1,682		8.5%
1930	2,025		20.4%
1940	2,766		36.6%
1950	2,038		−26.3%
1960	1,608		−21.1%
1970	1,554		−3.4%
1980	2,127		36.9%
1990	2,359		10.9%
2000	2,382		1.0%
2010	2,436		2.3%
U.S. Decennial Census; 1899 (shown as 1900) 1910-1930; 1930-1950 1980-2000 2010

== History ==
Bajura Adentro was in Spain's gazetteers until Puerto Rico was ceded by Spain in the aftermath of the Spanish–American War under the terms of the Treaty of Paris of 1898 and became an unincorporated territory of the United States. In 1899, the United States Department of War conducted a census of Puerto Rico, finding that the population of Bajura Adentro barrio was 881.

== See also ==
- List of communities in Puerto Rico
