= Río Arriba Poniente =

Barrio of Manatí, Puerto Rico

- Barrio
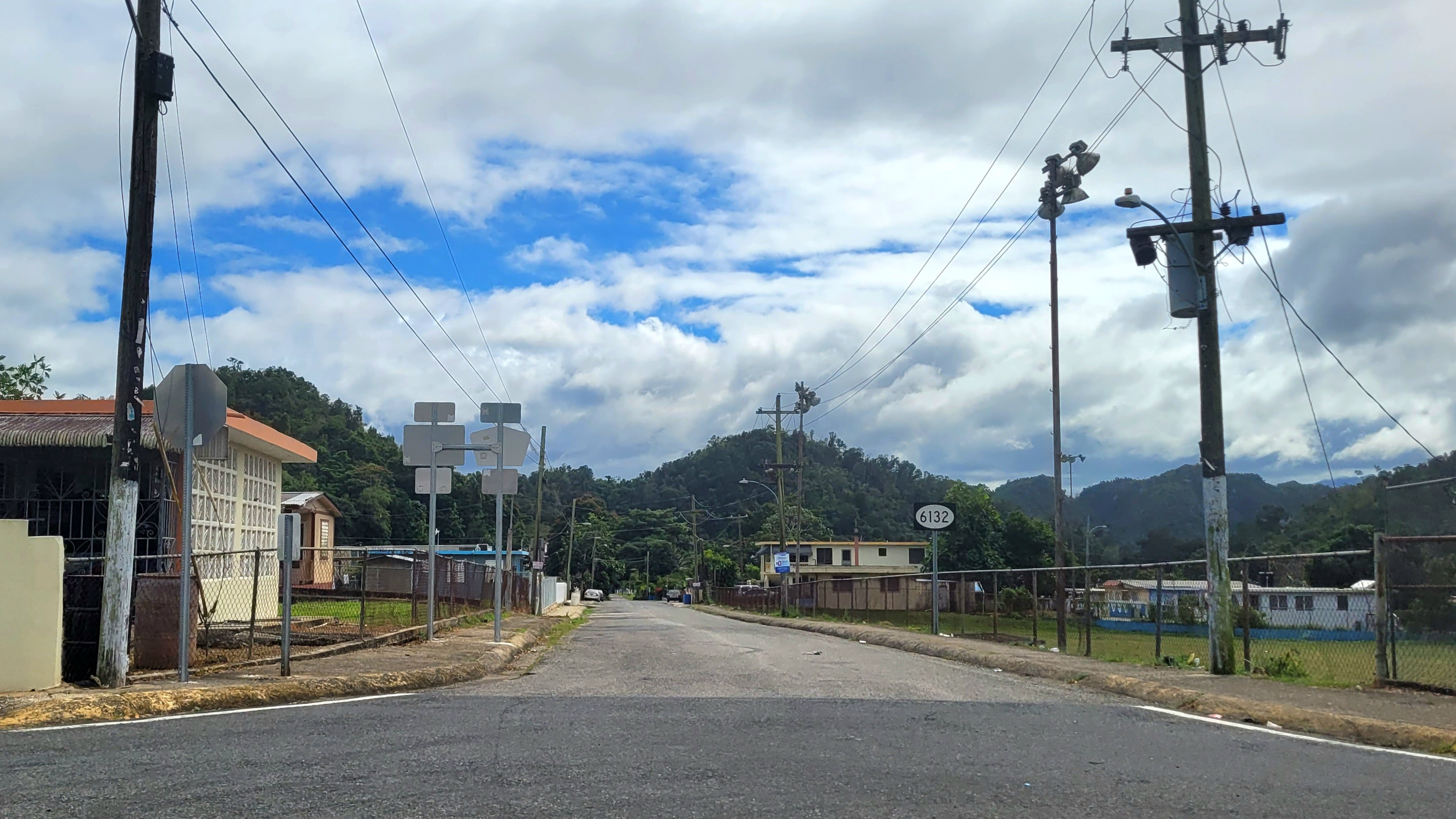
- Puerto Rico Highway 6132 in Río Arriba Poniente

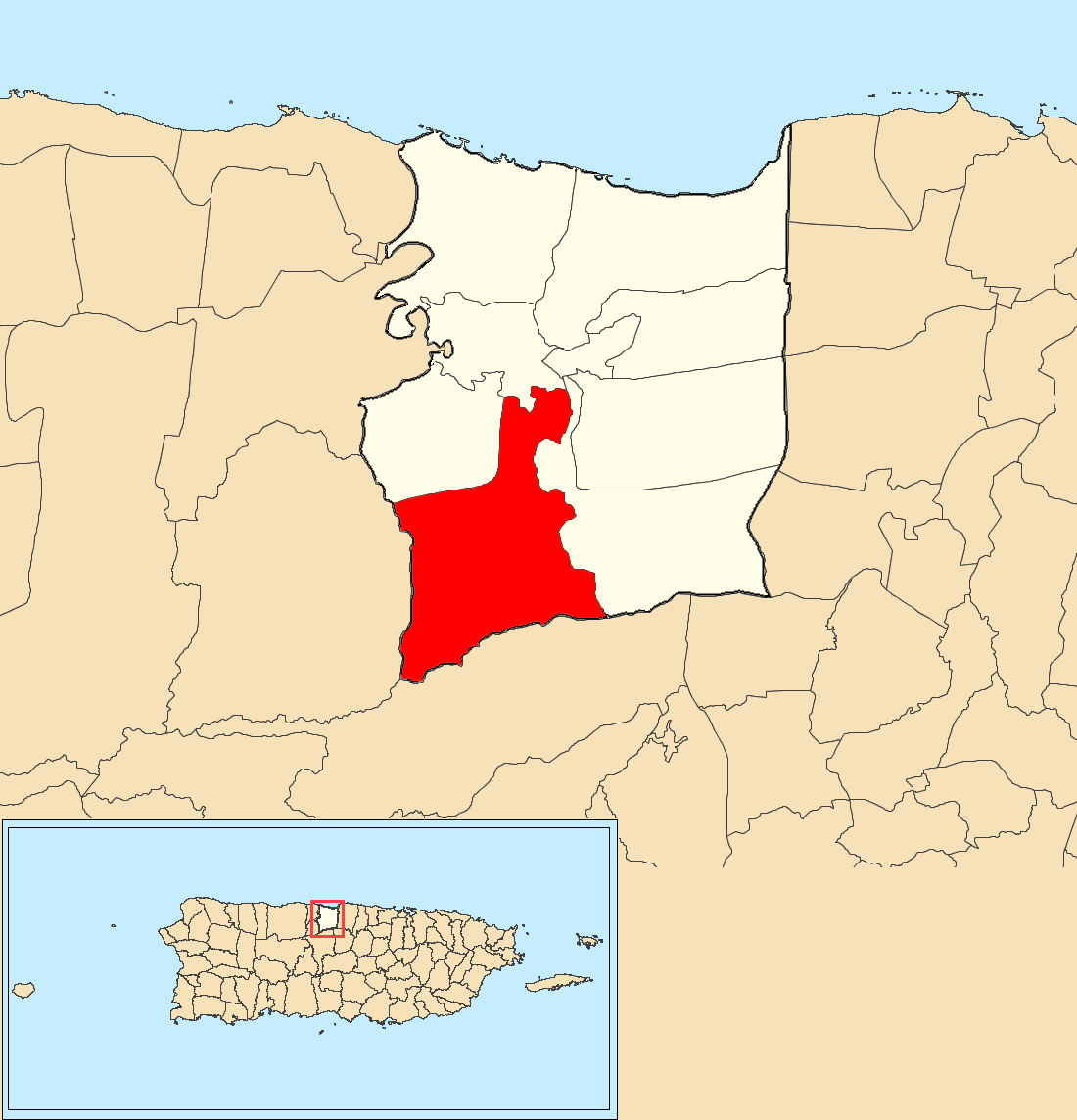
- Location of Río Arriba Poniente within the municipality of Manatí shown in red

- Location of Puerto Rico
- Coordinates: 18°23′11″N 66°30′48″W
- Commonwealth: Puerto Rico
- Municipality: Manatí

Area
  - Total: 8.35 sq mi (21.6 km^{2})
  - Land: 8.31 sq mi (21.5 km^{2})
  - Water: 0.04 sq mi (0.10 km^{2})
- Elevation: 617 ft (188 m)

Population (2010)
  - Total: 1,857
  - Density: 223.5/sq mi (86.3/km^{2})
- Source: 2010 Census
- Time zone: UTC−4 (AST)
- ZIP Code: 00674
- Area code: 787/939

Río Arriba Poniente is a rural barrio in the municipality of Manatí, Puerto Rico. Its population in 2010 was 1,857.

Historical population
Census	Pop.	Note	%±
1900	1,862		—
1910	2,650		42.3%
1920	2,776		4.8%
1930	3,208		15.6%
1940	4,207		31.1%
1950	3,241		−23.0%
1960	2,186		−32.6%
1970	1,516		−30.6%
1980	1,599		5.5%
1990	1,717		7.4%
2000	1,769		3.0%
2010	1,857		5.0%
U.S. Decennial Census; 1899 (shown as 1900) 1910-1930; 1930-1950 1980-2000 2010

== History ==
Río Arriba Poniente was in Spain's gazetteers until Puerto Rico was ceded by Spain in the aftermath of the Spanish–American War under the terms of the Treaty of Paris of 1898 and became an unincorporated territory of the United States. In 1899, the United States Department of War conducted a census of Puerto Rico finding that the population of Río Arriba Poniente barrio was 1,862.

== Gallery ==
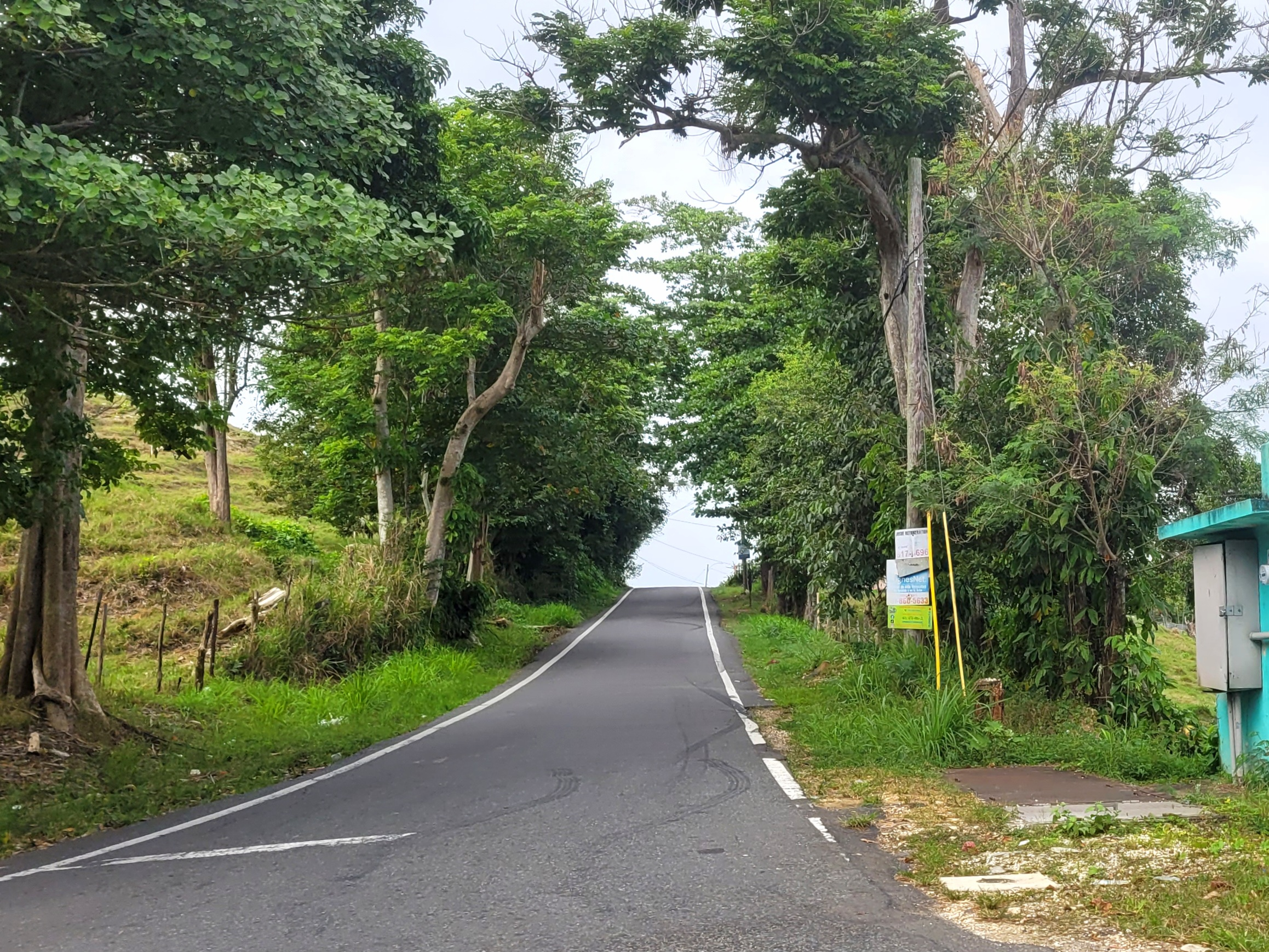
Puerto Rico Highway 641 in Río Arriba Poniente

== See also ==
- List of communities in Puerto Rico
