= Tierras Nuevas Saliente =

Barrio of Manatí, Puerto Rico

- Barrio
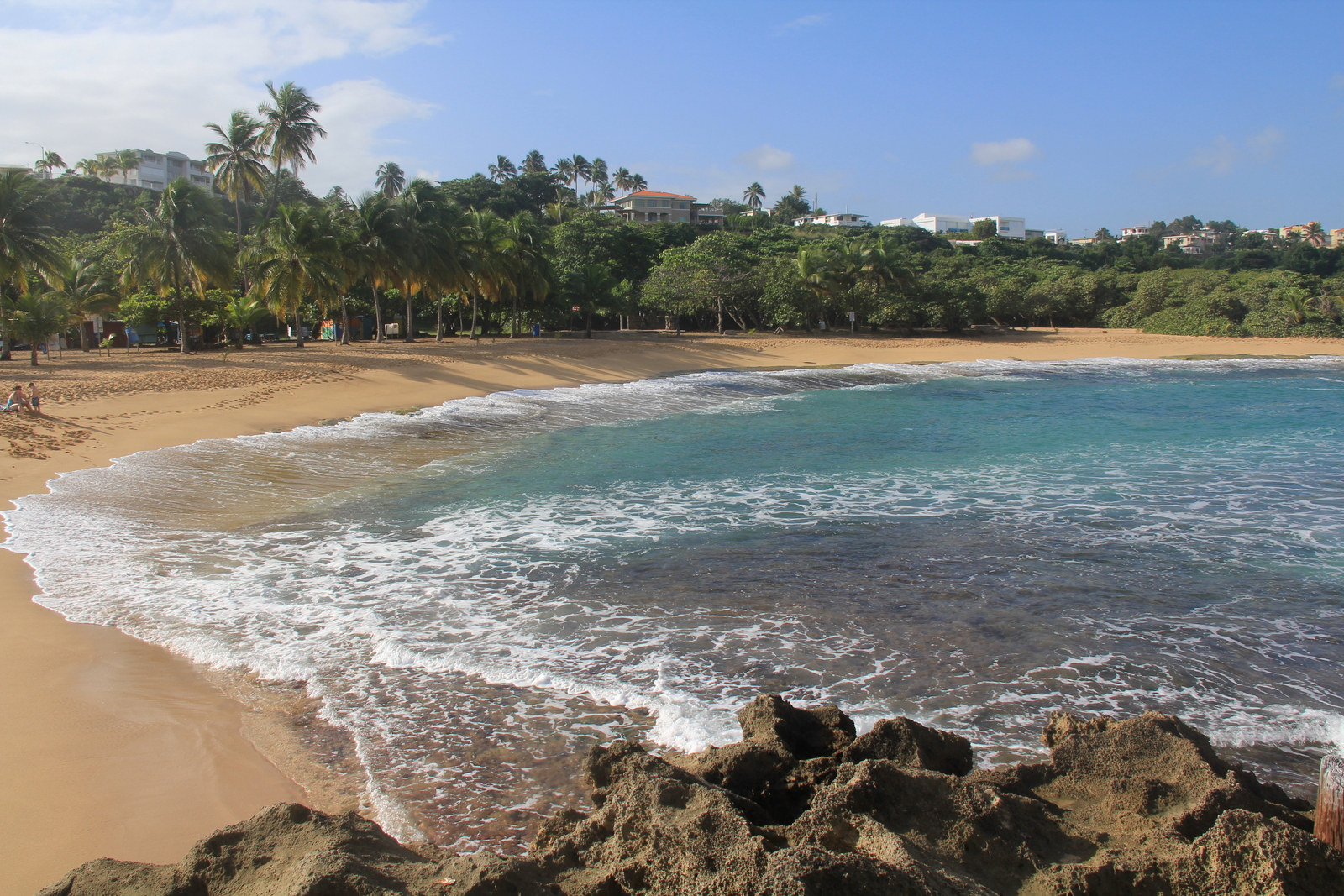
- Beach in Tierras Nuevas Saliente

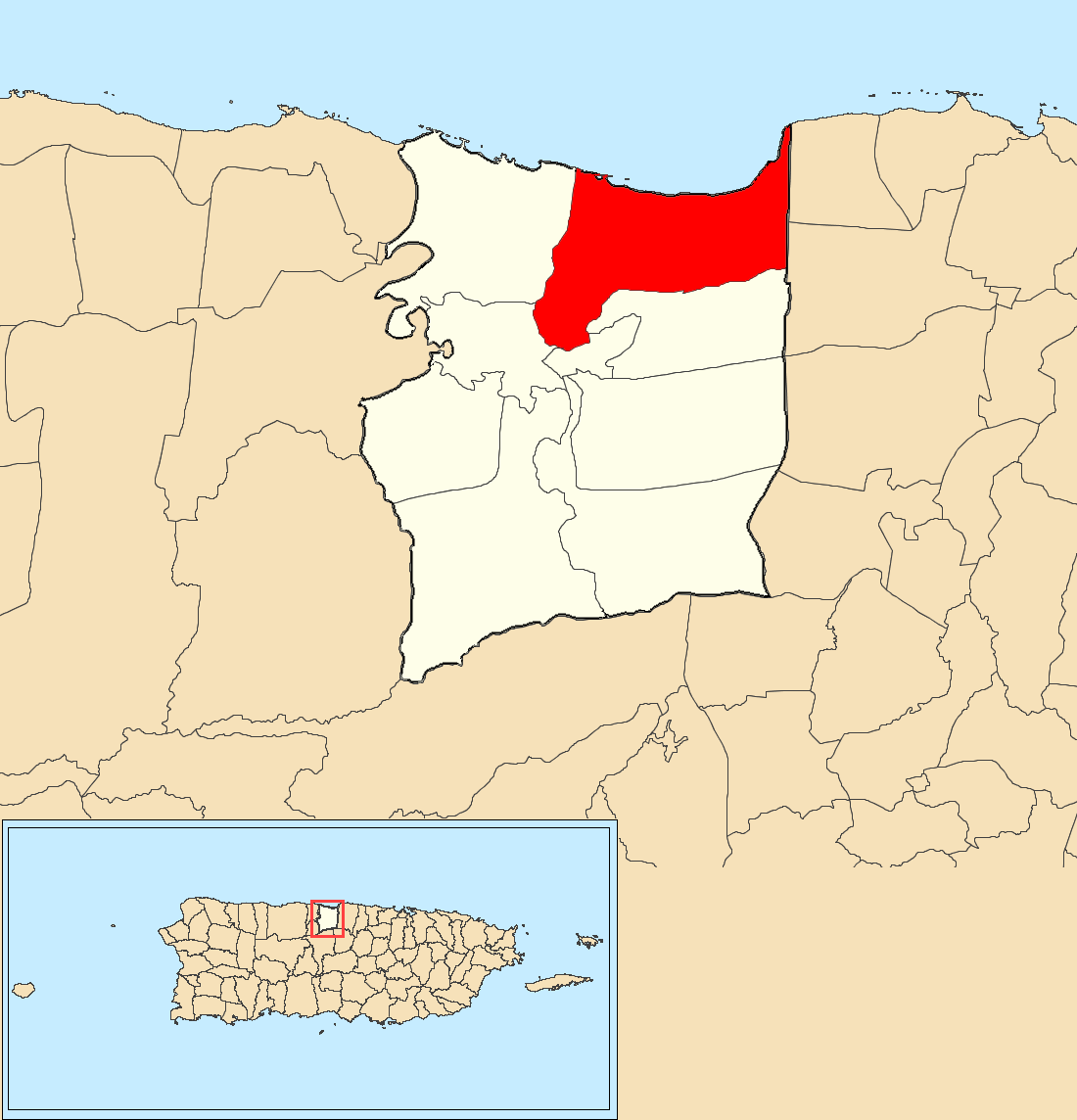
- Location of Tierras Nuevas Saliente within the municipality of Manatí shown in red

- Location of Puerto Rico
- Coordinates: 18°27′21″N 66°28′29″W
- Commonwealth: Puerto Rico
- Municipality: Manatí

Area
  - Total: 8.02 sq mi (20.8 km^{2})
  - Land: 6.60 sq mi (17.1 km^{2})
  - Water: 1.42 sq mi (3.7 km^{2})
- Elevation: 43 ft (13 m)

Population (2010)
  - Total: 6,757
  - Density: 1,023.8/sq mi (395.3/km^{2})
- Source: 2010 Census
- Time zone: UTC−4 (AST)
- ZIP Code: 00674
- Area code: 787/939

Tierras Nuevas Saliente is a barrio in the municipality of Manatí, Puerto Rico. Its population in 2010 was 6,757.

Historical population
Census	Pop.	Note	%±
1900	776		—
1910	853		9.9%
1920	1,276		49.6%
1930	939		−26.4%
1940	2,457		161.7%
1950	2,362		−3.9%
1960	2,785		17.9%
1970	2,856		2.5%
1980	3,426		20.0%
1990	4,254		24.2%
2000	5,786		36.0%
2010	6,757		16.8%
U.S. Decennial Census; 1899 (shown as 1900) 1910-1930; 1930-1950 1980-2000 2010

== History ==
Tierras Nuevas Saliente was in Spain's gazetteers until Puerto Rico was ceded by Spain in the aftermath of the Spanish–American War under the terms of the Treaty of Paris of 1898 and became an unincorporated territory of the United States. In 1899, the United States Department of War conducted a census of Puerto Rico finding that the population of Tierras Nuevas Saliente barrio was 776.

== Features ==
Mar Chiquita Beach, which is considered a dangerous beach, is located in Tierras Nuevas Saliente.

Part of the Laguna Tortuguero is located in Tierras Nuevas Saliente. The eastern part of the lagoon is in Vega Baja, which borders Manatí.

== Sectors ==
Barrios (which are, in contemporary times, roughly comparable to minor civil divisions) in turn are further subdivided into smaller local populated place areas/units called sectores (sectors in English). The types of sectores may vary, from normally sector to urbanización to reparto to barriada to residencial, among others.

== Gallery ==
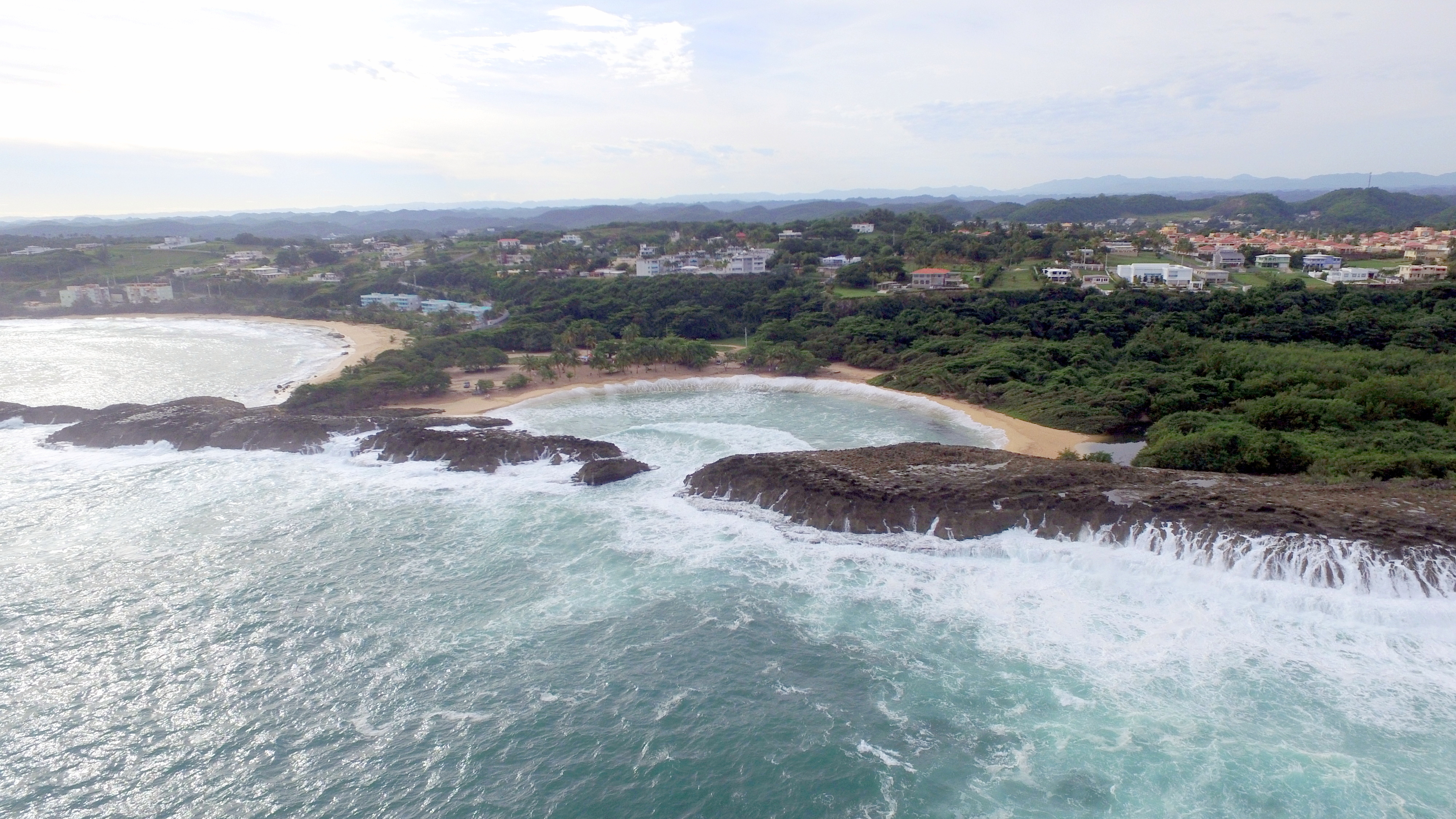
View of Mar Chiquita beach / bay

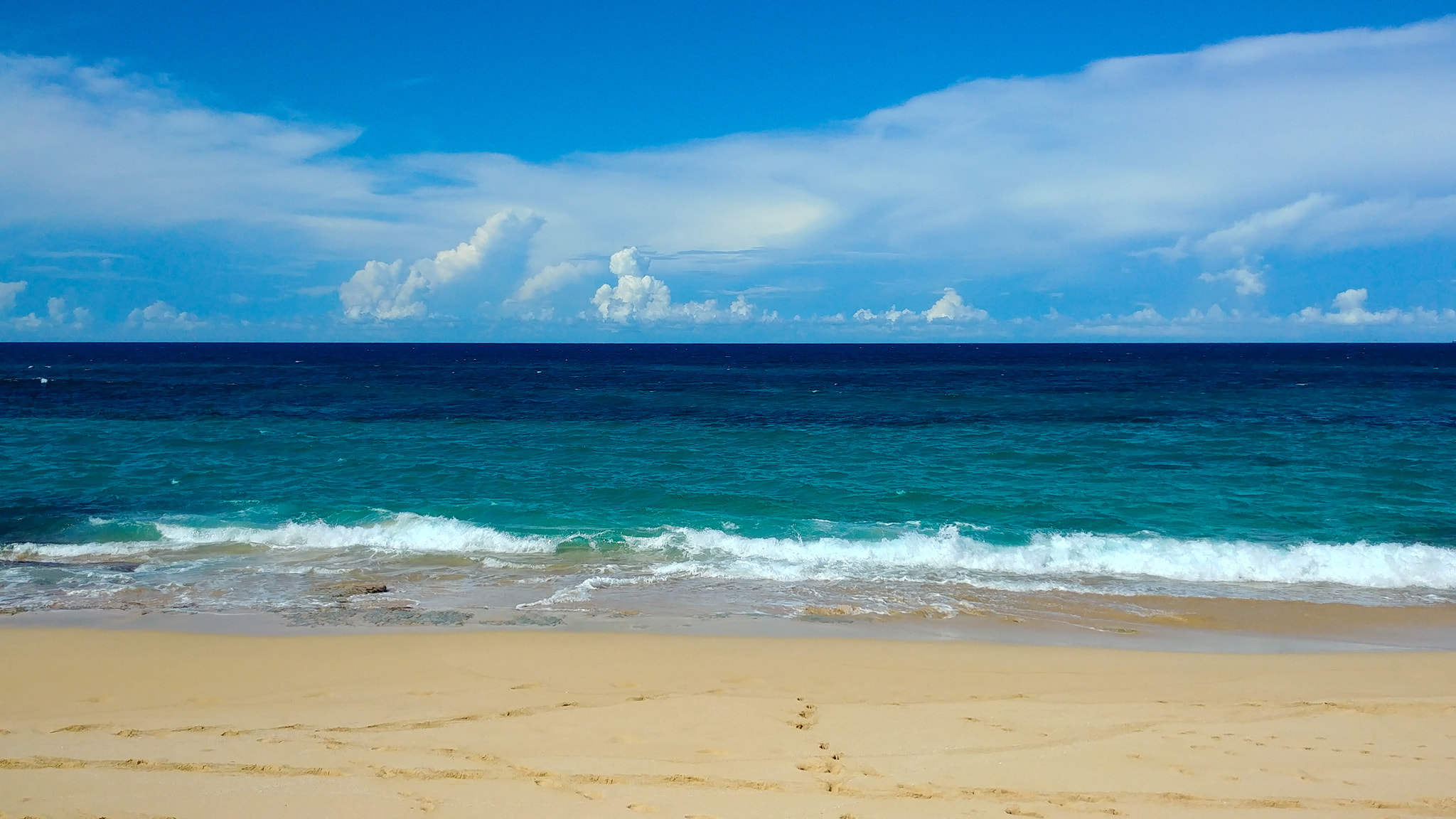
Los Tubos Beach in Tierras Nuevas Saliente

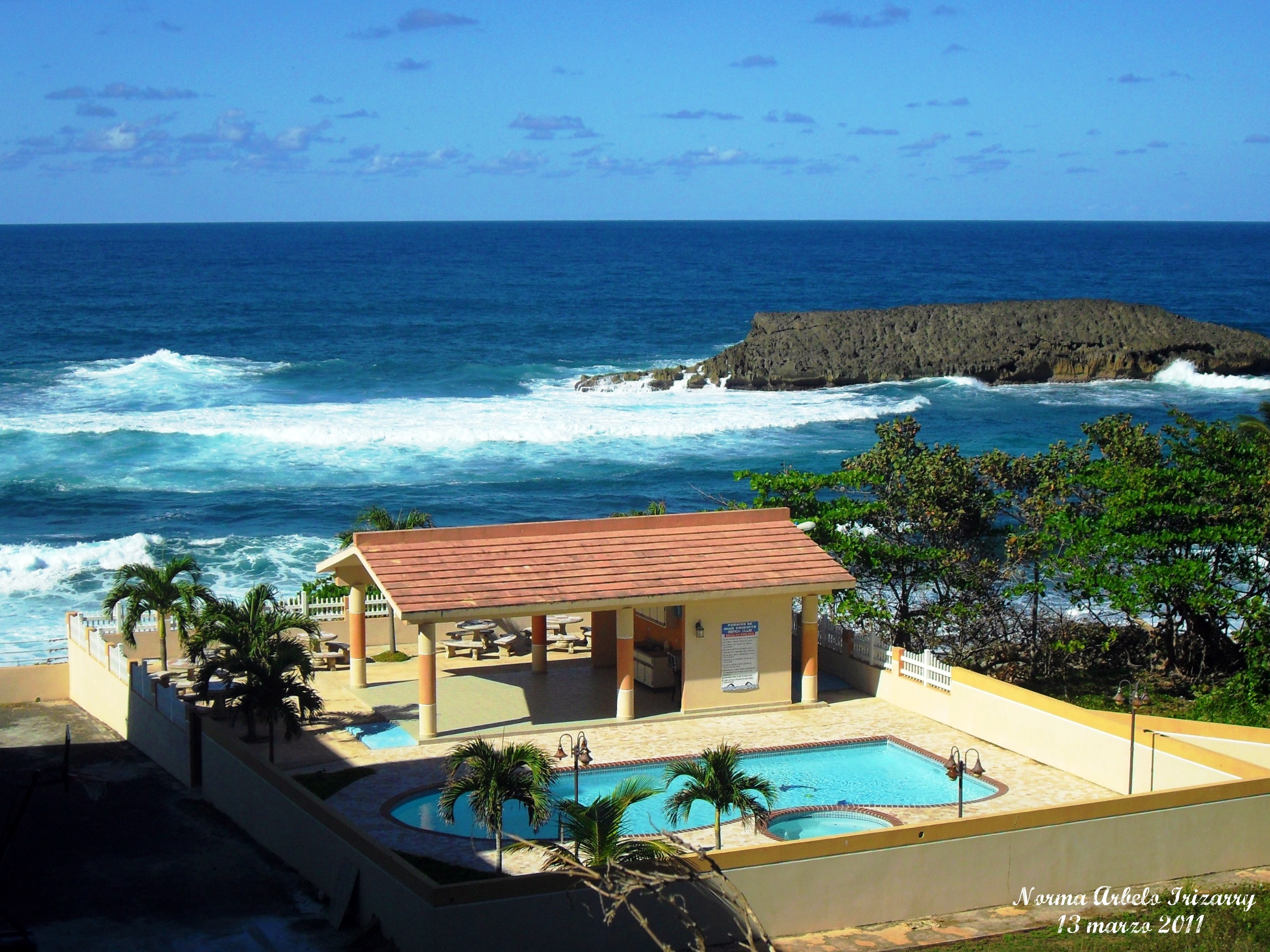
Pool and cover at Mar Chiquita Beach Club

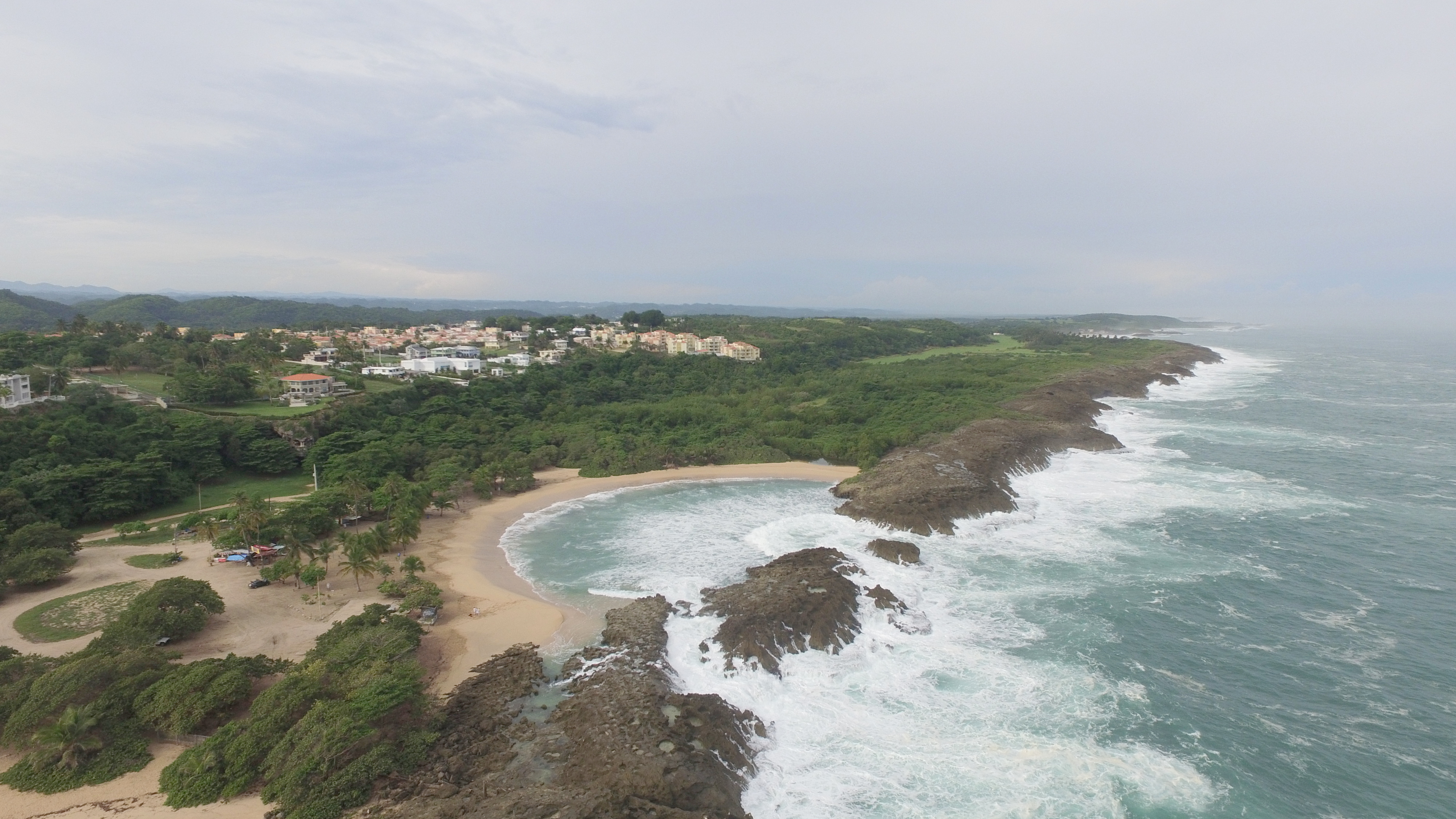
Mar Chiquita in Tierras Nuevas Saliente

== See also ==
- List of communities in Puerto Rico
