= Tierras Nuevas Poniente =

Barrio of Manatí, Puerto Rico

- Barrio
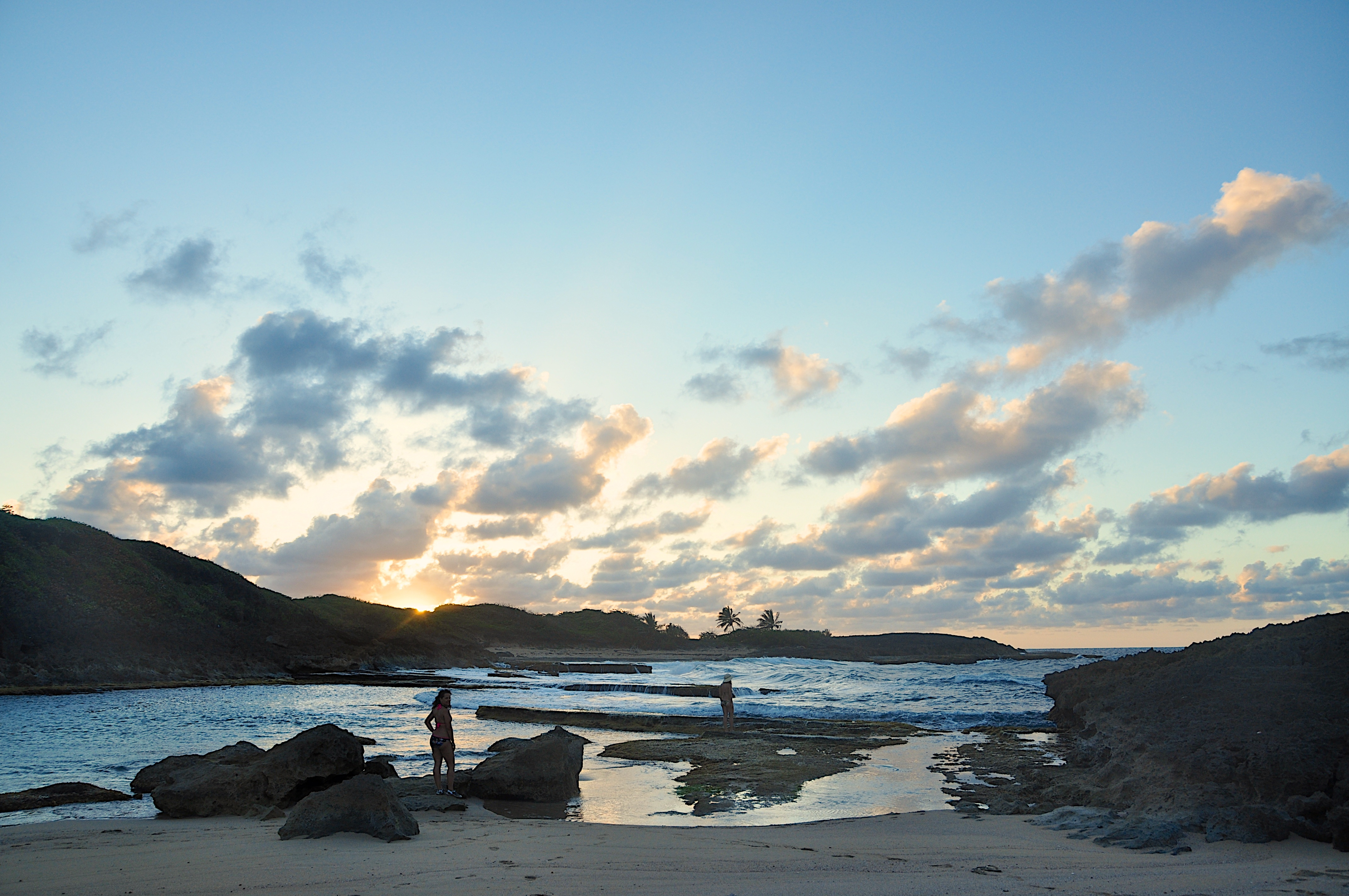
- Secluded beach in Tierras Nuevas Poniente

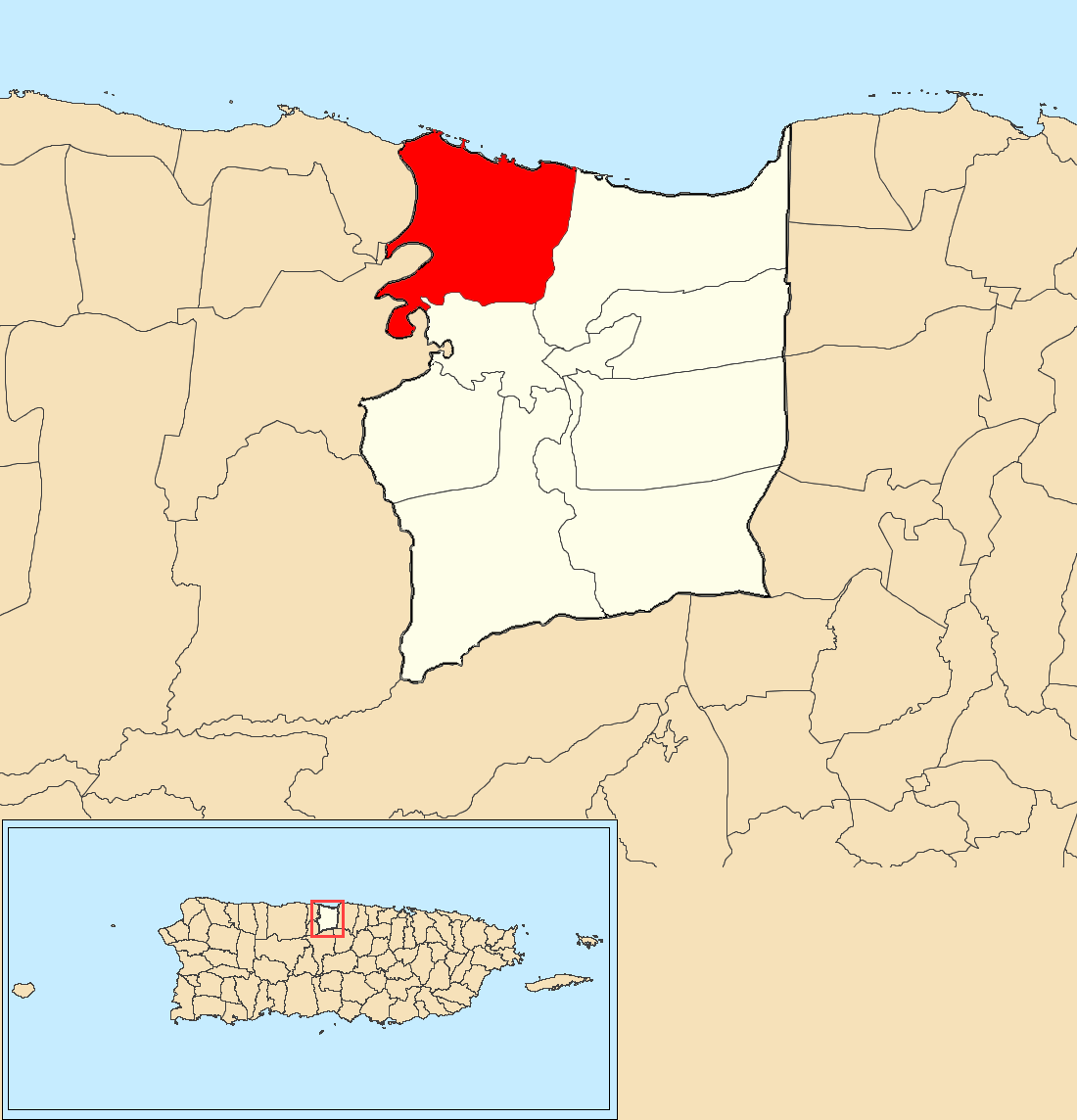
- Location of Tierras Nuevas Poniente within the municipality of Manatí shown in red

- Location of Puerto Rico
- Coordinates: 18°27′47″N 66°30′54″W
- Commonwealth: Puerto Rico
- Municipality: Manatí

Area
  - Total: 7.30 sq mi (18.9 km^{2})
  - Land: 6.26 sq mi (16.2 km^{2})
  - Water: 1.04 sq mi (2.7 km^{2})
- Elevation: 10 ft (3.0 m)

Population (2010)
  - Total: 3,614
  - Density: 577.3/sq mi (222.9/km^{2})
- Source: 2010 Census
- Time zone: UTC−4 (AST)
- ZIP Code: 00674
- Area code: 787/939

Tierras Nuevas Poniente is a rural barrio in the municipality of Manatí, Puerto Rico. Its population in 2010 was 3,614.

Historical population
Census	Pop.	Note	%±
1900	1,534		—
1910	1,770		15.4%
1920	1,715		−3.1%
1930	2,568		49.7%
1940	2,621		2.1%
1950	2,435		−7.1%
1960	2,212		−9.2%
1970	2,188		−1.1%
1980	2,841		29.8%
1990	3,299		16.1%
2000	4,098		24.2%
2010	3,614		−11.8%
U.S. Decennial Census; 1899 (shown as 1900) 1910-1930; 1930-1950 1980-2000 2010

== History ==
Tierras Nuevas Poniente was in Spain's gazetteers until Puerto Rico was ceded by Spain in the aftermath of the Spanish–American War under the terms of the Treaty of Paris of 1898. It became an unincorporated territory of the United States. In 1899, the United States Department of War conducted a census of Puerto Rico finding that the population of Tierras Nuevas Poniente barrio was 1,534.

== Places of interest ==
Playa Cueva Las Golondrinas, where visitors have been cited for public indecency, is located in Tierras Nuevas Poniente. Puerto Rico does not have nudist beaches.

== Gallery ==
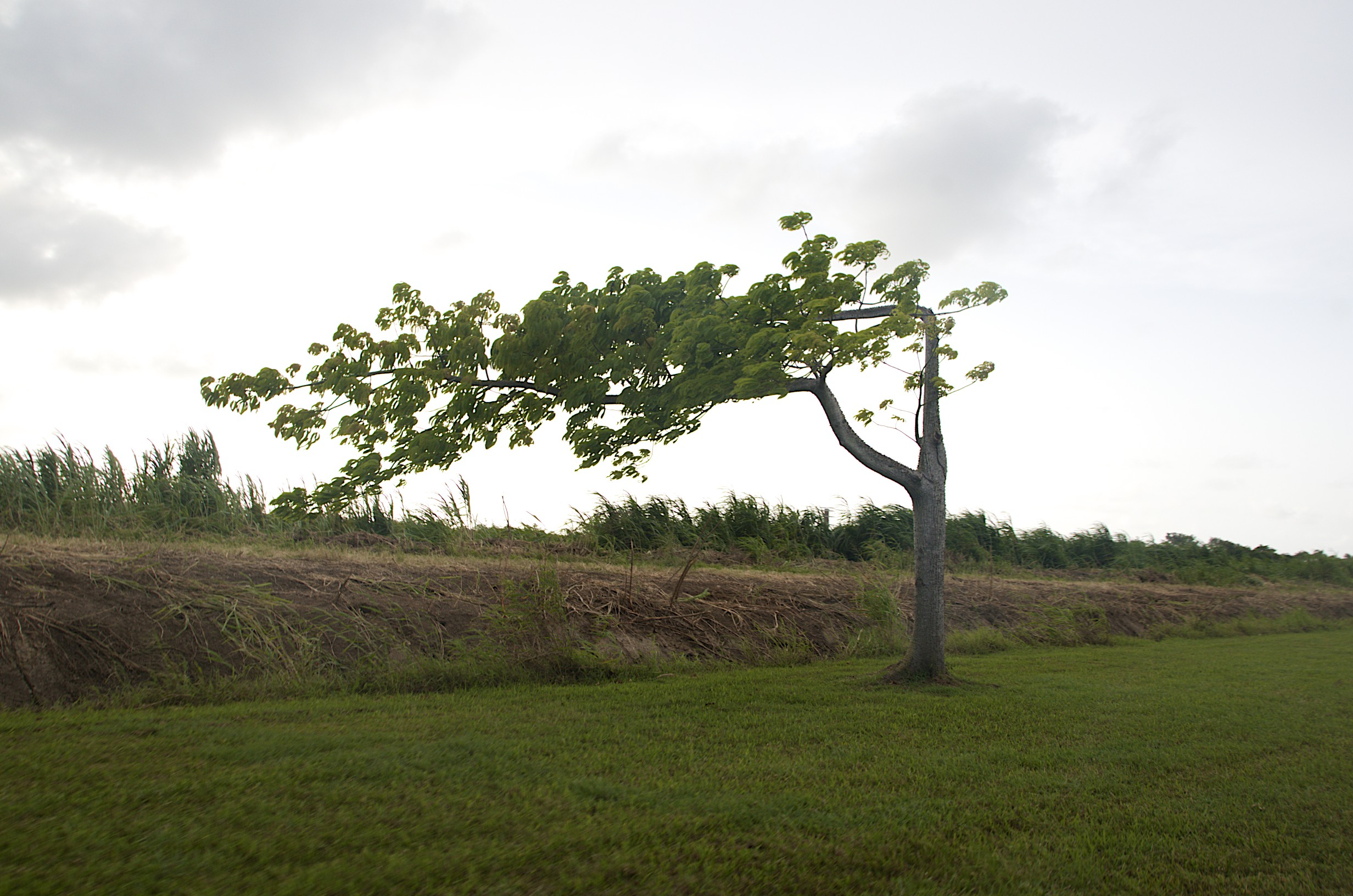
On the road (Calle La Esperanza) heading north towards Esperanza Beach

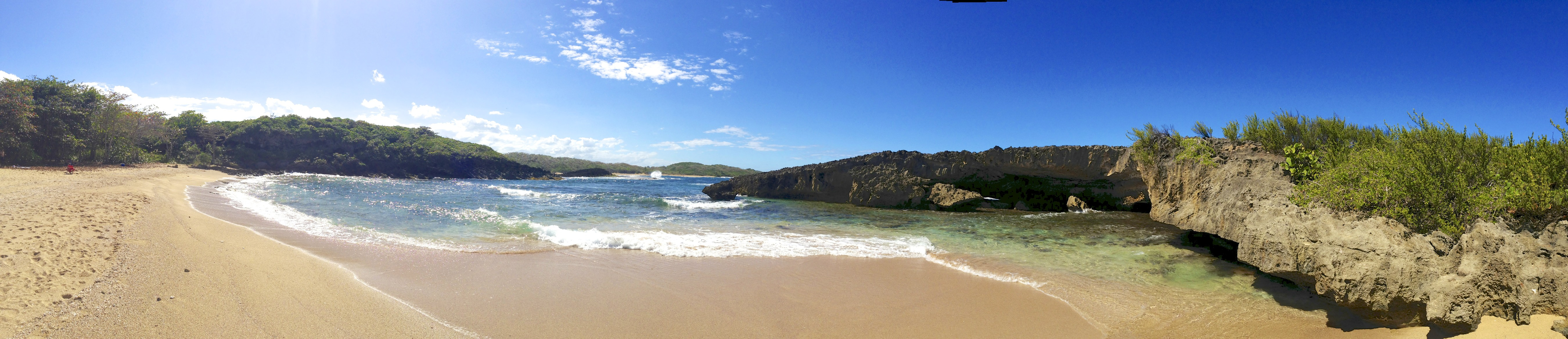
Cueva de las Golondrinas

== See also ==
- List of communities in Puerto Rico
