= Manatí, Puerto Rico =

City and municipality in Puerto Rico

Manatí Municipio Autónomo de Manatí
- City and municipality
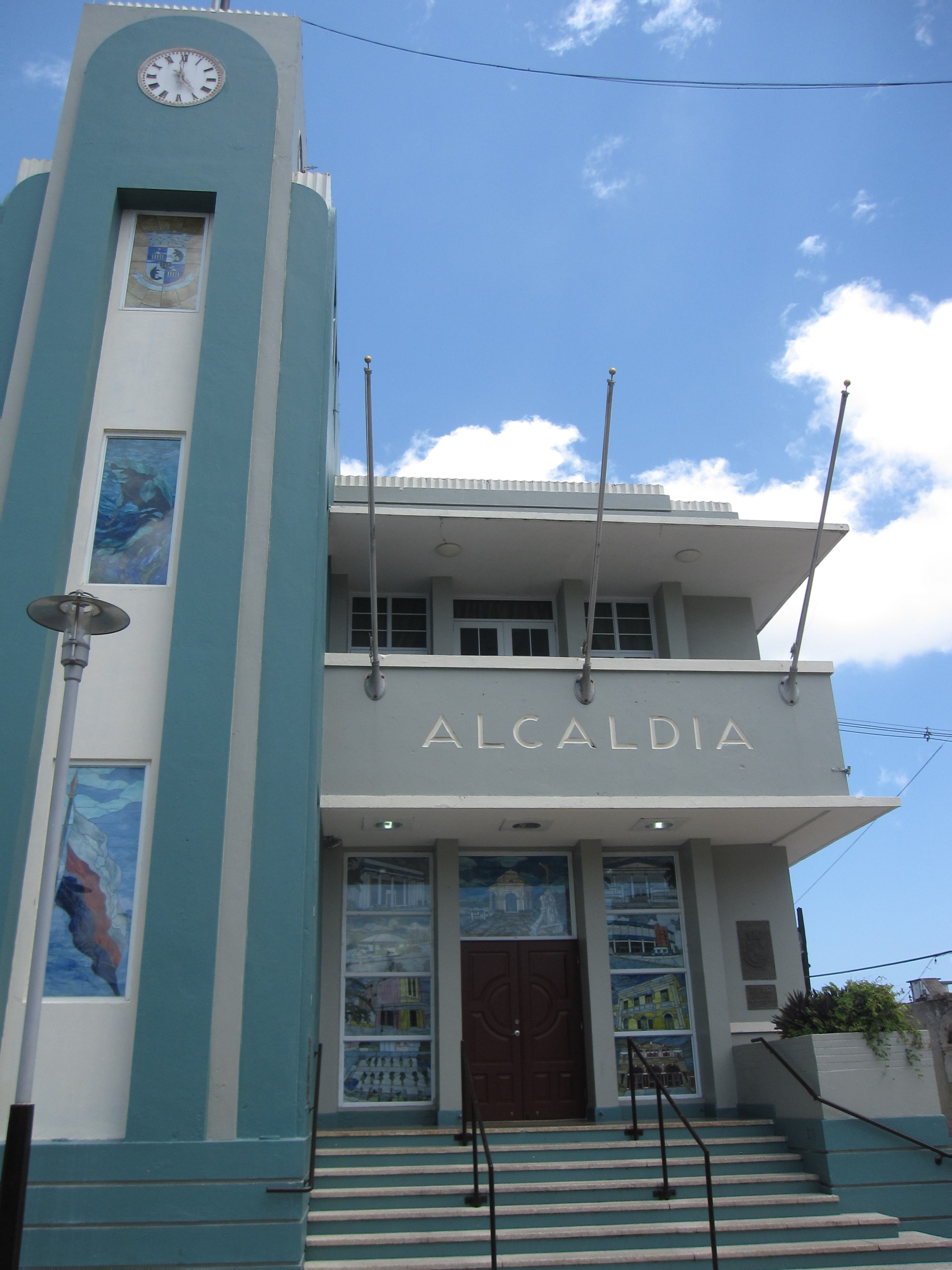
- Town Hall in Manatí

- Flag Coat of arms
- Nicknames: "Ciudad Metropolitana", "La Atenas de Puerto Rico"
- Anthem: "Atenas de Borinquen"
- Map of Puerto Rico highlighting Manatí Municipality
- Coordinates: 18°25′57″N 66°29′4″W
- Sovereign state: United States
- Commonwealth: Puerto Rico
- Settled: 1680
- Founded: June 29, 1738
- Founder: Pedro Menéndez de Valdés
- Barrios: 9 barrios: Bajura Adentro; Bajura Afuera; Coto Norte; Coto Sur; Manatí barrio-pueblo; Río Arriba Poniente; Río Arriba Saliente; Tierras Nuevas Poniente; Tierras Nuevas Saliente

Government
  - Mayor: José Sánchez González (PNP)
  - Senatorial dist.: 3 - Arecibo
  - Representative dist.: 12, 13

Area
  - Total: 56.19 sq mi (145.53 km^{2})
  - Land: 46 sq mi (120 km^{2})
  - Water: 9.86 sq mi (25.53 km^{2})

Population (2020)
  - Total: 39,492
  - Estimate (2025): 38,413 ▼
  - Rank: 23rd in Puerto Rico
  - Density: 850/sq mi (330/km^{2})
- Demonym: Manatieños
- Time zone: UTC−4 (AST)
- ZIP Code: 00674
- Area code: 787/939

Manatí (Spanish pronunciation: [manaˈti]) is a city and municipality of Puerto Rico on the northern coast. It is north of Morovis and Ciales, east of Florida and Barceloneta, and west of Vega Baja. Manatí has over 8 barrios and Manatí barrio-pueblo, the downtown area and the administrative center of the city. It is part of the San Juan-Caguas-Guaynabo Metropolitan Statistical Area.

== History ==
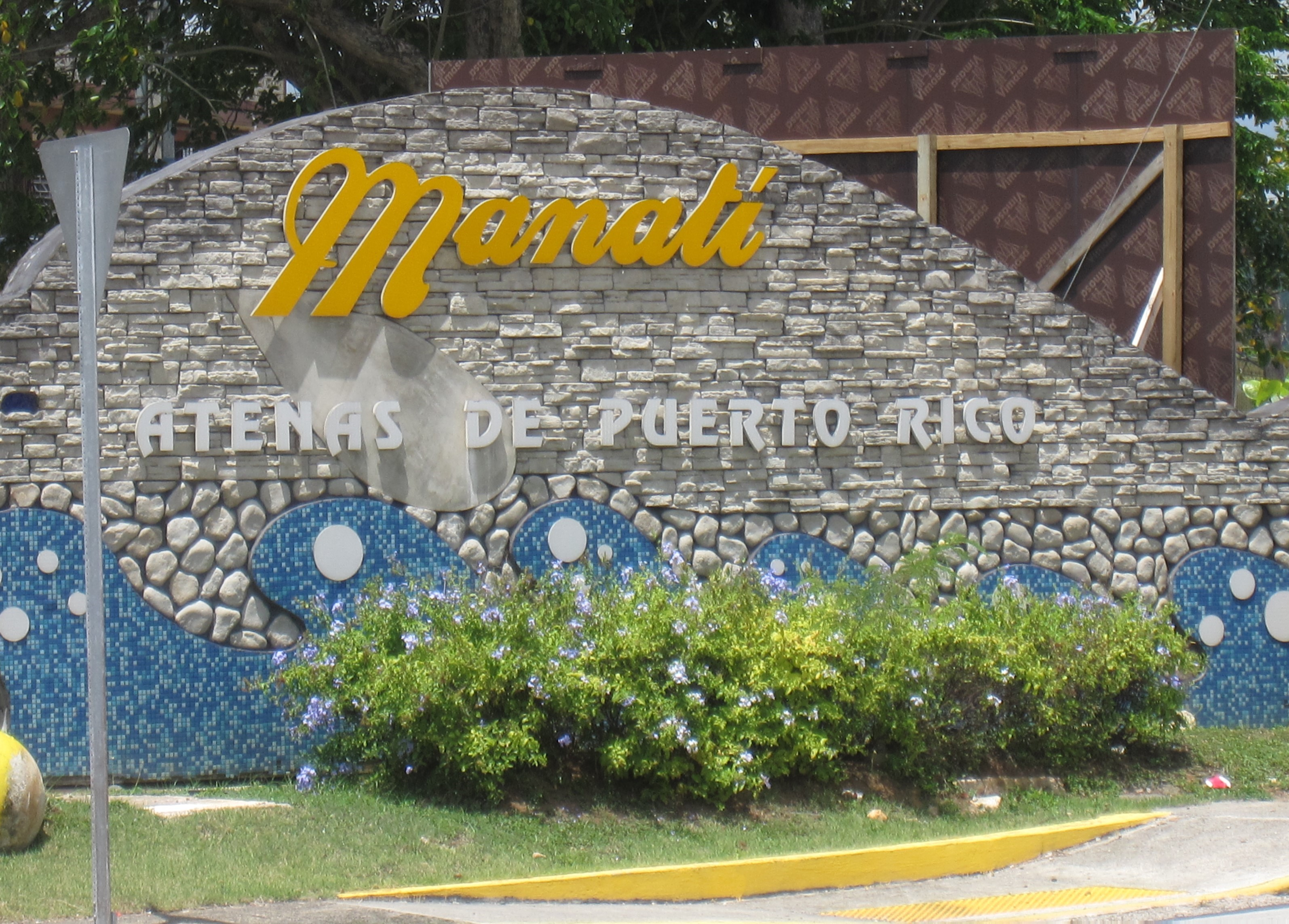
Manatí logo Atenas de Puerto Rico (in English: Athens of Puerto Rico)

Manatí was founded in 1738 by Don Pedro Menendez Valdes. The Iglesia Nuestra Señora de la Candelaria church was built in the seventeenth century and is still standing in its original spot. Manati is known as La Ciudad Metropolitana (The Metropolitan City), and also as Las Atenas de Puerto Rico, (The Athens of Puerto Rico). It is named after the manatee.

In the formative years of the town's development, the town mayor was José Aulet. It was Juan Ponce de León who identified the Manatí section of the Manuatabón River as the inaugural site for gold panning efforts. The Aulet family possessed extensive lands that were abundant in pineapples, sugar cane, and green bananas. In 1985, the Aulet family entered into a transaction to sell this land to the government.

In 1853, the region experienced a significant transition from mining to an expansion of agricultural practices, with particular emphasis on the cultivation and processing of sugar cane. The demand for sugar, coupled with its elevated price in international markets, solidified sugar cane as the primary commodity crop of the area. Additionally, carpentry gained prominence as a trade during this period. At that time, the town consisted of 280 residences, two public squares, eight streets, and a school serving 50 pupils.

Puerto Rico was ceded by Spain in the aftermath of the Spanish–American War under the terms of the Treaty of Paris of 1898 and became a territory of the United States. In 1899, the United States Department of War conducted a census of Puerto Rico, concluding that the population of Manatí was of 13,989 people.

On September 20, 2017, Hurricane Maria struck Puerto Rico. In Manatí, the hurricane wrought considerable devastation, resulting in approximately 1,500 residences being either destroyed or damaged. Highways were rendered impassable due to the accumulation of debris and flooding, leaving numerous communities isolated and without means of communication. The breaching of the Río Grande de Manatí caused the destruction of many structures including around 70 residences.

== Geography ==
Manatí is on the northern central coast and the Northern Karst.

=== Barrios ===
Like all municipalities of Puerto Rico, Manatí is divided into barrios. The municipal buildings, central square and a large Catholic church are located in the center of the municipality, in a barrio referred to as "el pueblo".

1. Bajura Adentro
2. Bajura Afuera
3. Coto Norte
4. Coto Sur
5. Manatí barrio-pueblo
6. Río Arriba Poniente
7. Río Arriba Saliente
8. Tierras Nuevas Poniente
9. Tierras Nuevas Saliente

=== Sectors ===
Barrios (which are, in contemporary times, roughly comparable to minor civil divisions) and subbarrios, are further subdivided into smaller areas called sectores (sectors in English). The types of sectores may vary, from normally sector to urbanización to reparto to barriada to residencial, among others.

=== Special communities ===
Comunidades Especiales de Puerto Rico (Special Communities of Puerto Rico) are marginalized communities whose citizens are experiencing a certain amount of social exclusion. A map shows these communities occur in nearly every municipality of the commonwealth. Of the 742 places that were on the list in 2014, the following barrios, communities, sectors, or neighborhoods were in Manatí: Cerro Gandía, Cerro Quiñones and El Horno.

=== Climate ===
Climate data for Manatí 2E, Puerto Rico (1991–2020 normals, extremes 1900–present)
Month	Jan	Feb	Mar	Apr	May	Jun	Jul	Aug	Sep	Oct	Nov	Dec	Year
Record high °F (°C)	92 (33)	96 (36)	97 (36)	99 (37)	99 (37)	100 (38)	100 (38)	98 (37)	98 (37)	98 (37)	98 (37)	95 (35)	100 (38)
Mean maximum °F (°C)	86.3 (30.2)	87.3 (30.7)	88.8 (31.6)	90.6 (32.6)	92.1 (33.4)	92.8 (33.8)	91.5 (33.1)	92.0 (33.3)	92.1 (33.4)	91.5 (33.1)	89.1 (31.7)	87.2 (30.7)	93.9 (34.4)
Mean daily maximum °F (°C)	81.2 (27.3)	81.8 (27.7)	82.7 (28.2)	83.8 (28.8)	85.2 (29.6)	87.0 (30.6)	86.4 (30.2)	87.2 (30.7)	87.2 (30.7)	86.6 (30.3)	84.1 (28.9)	82.3 (27.9)	84.6 (29.2)
Daily mean °F (°C)	73.4 (23.0)	73.5 (23.1)	74.2 (23.4)	75.7 (24.3)	77.5 (25.3)	79.4 (26.3)	79.3 (26.3)	79.8 (26.6)	79.4 (26.3)	78.7 (25.9)	76.7 (24.8)	74.8 (23.8)	76.9 (24.9)
Mean daily minimum °F (°C)	65.6 (18.7)	65.2 (18.4)	65.7 (18.7)	67.7 (19.8)	69.8 (21.0)	71.7 (22.1)	72.1 (22.3)	72.4 (22.4)	71.6 (22.0)	70.7 (21.5)	69.2 (20.7)	67.4 (19.7)	69.1 (20.6)
Mean minimum °F (°C)	62.5 (16.9)	62.2 (16.8)	62.6 (17.0)	64.2 (17.9)	66.4 (19.1)	69.4 (20.8)	70.2 (21.2)	70.7 (21.5)	69.6 (20.9)	68.8 (20.4)	66.0 (18.9)	64.0 (17.8)	60.5 (15.8)
Record low °F (°C)	50 (10)	51 (11)	53 (12)	54 (12)	55 (13)	58 (14)	58 (14)	59 (15)	60 (16)	60 (16)	59 (15)	57 (14)	50 (10)
Average precipitation inches (mm)	5.09 (129)	3.16 (80)	4.07 (103)	4.91 (125)	6.21 (158)	3.41 (87)	5.35 (136)	5.36 (136)	5.67 (144)	5.67 (144)	7.59 (193)	5.39 (137)	61.88 (1,572)
Average precipitation days (≥ 0.01 in)	14.6	11.7	10.2	11.5	13.9	10.8	14.0	14.6	13.9	14.6	17.2	16.2	163.2
Source: NOAA

== Demographics ==
Historical population
Census	Pop.	Note	%±
1900	13,989		—
1910	17,240		23.2%
1920	20,100		16.6%
1930	24,838		23.6%
1940	29,366		18.2%
1950	30,449		3.7%
1960	29,354		−3.6%
1970	30,559		4.1%
1980	36,562		19.6%
1990	38,692		5.8%
2000	45,409		17.4%
2010	44,113		−2.9%
2020	39,492		−10.5%
2025 (est.)	38,413	▼	−2.7%
U.S. Decennial Census; 1899 (shown as 1900) 1910–1930; 1930–1950 1960–2000 2010 2020

== Tourism ==
In 2014, Manati welcomed its first hotel, the Hyatt Place Hotel and Casino, located next to Casino Atlántico and a LongHorn Steakhouse, which opened in April 2014. The hotel has an outdoor swimming pool, 3 meeting rooms and a fitness center. The official name was Hyatt Place Manati & Casino. Manati is popular for its beaches and is part of the Porta Altantico tourism district.

In 2019, Manatí began offering free tours of its city, beaches, historic places and eateries.

=== Landmarks and places of interest ===
Some of the places of interest in Manatí include:

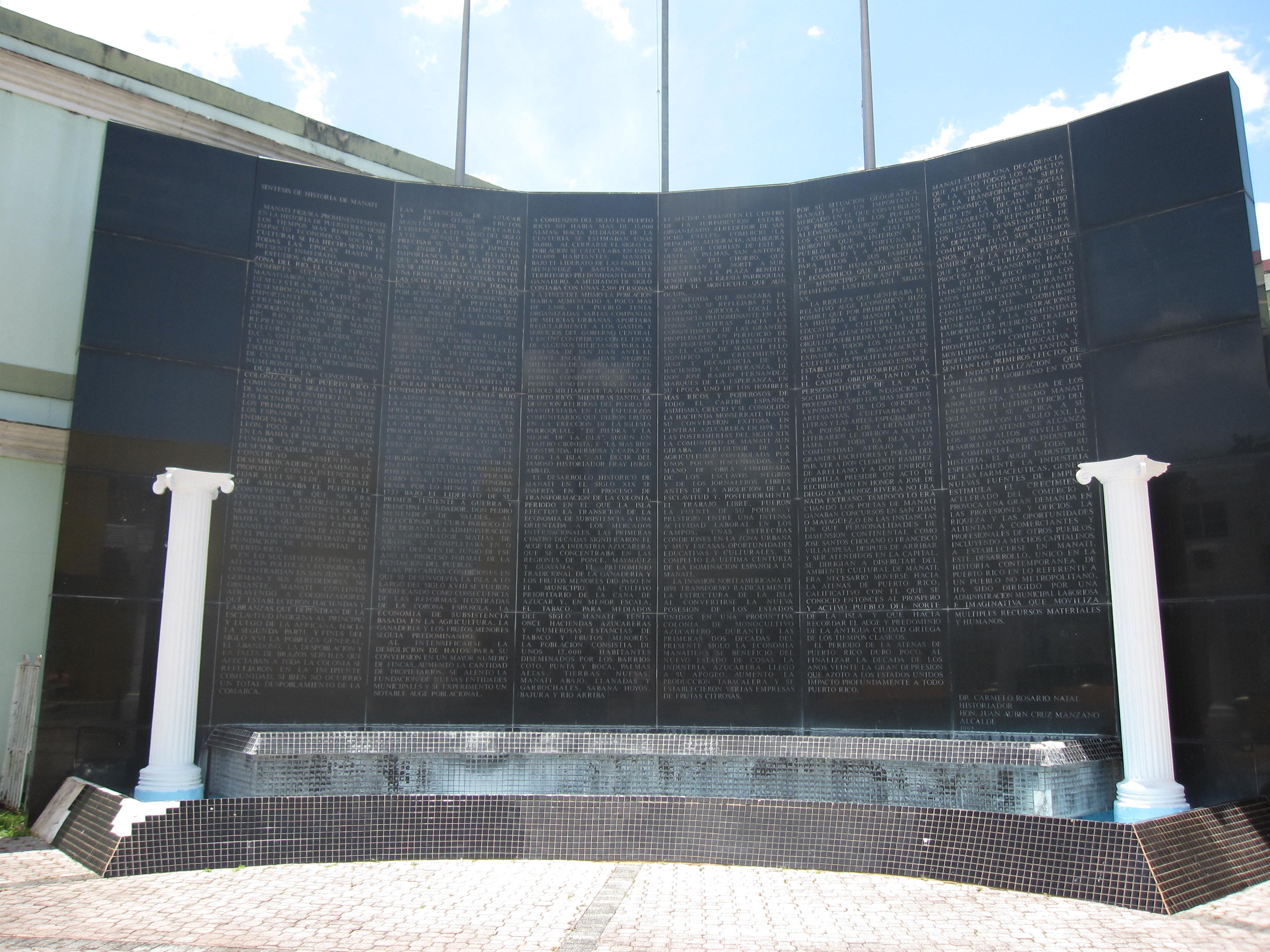
La Plaza de la Historia de Manatí en Puerto Rico

- The Acropolis Sports Complex
- Biblioteca Nacional Francisco Álvarez
- El Salón del Poeta
- Historic Zone
- Los Tubos Beach
- La Esperanza Beach and Hacienda Azucarera la Esperanza
- Playa Cueva Las Golondrinas, where visitors have been cited for public indecency. (Puerto Rico does not have nudist beaches.)
- Mar Chiquita Beach, which is considered the most popular beach in the city.
- Marqués de la Esperanza Hacienda Ruins
- Ruinas de la Oficina de la Central Monserrate
- The New Manati Arena
- Manati Baseball Stadium
- Playa Poza de las Mujeres, which is considered a dangerous beach.

== Economy ==
=== Agriculture ===
Isidoro Colón established the "Candelaria" sugar mill in the years between 1860 and 1870, located between Manatí and Barceloneta. Manatí is the pineapple center of Puerto Rico. In addition in Manatí, there is cultivation of fruits, sugar cane, and coffee. Los Frutos del Guacabo is a farming company in Manatí that provides local fruit and vegetables to local chefs.

=== Industry ===
The industry of Manatí is shoes, woodwork, and a pineapple cannery as well as pharmaceuticals:

- Bristol-Myers Squibb
- Warner Chilcott
- DuPont
- Patheon

== Healthcare ==
Manati has two large, private hospitals, Doctor's Center Hospital, and Manatí Medical Center Dr. Otero Lopez (formerly the government owned Hospital de Area). There is also the smaller Municipal Hospital.

The area surrounding PR-2 is known for having many medical offices.

== Education ==
Manati has 3 public high schools: Petra Corretjer de O'neill High School, Fernando Callejo High School, and the Escuela Instituto Tecnologico Recinto De Manati, the latter also serving as a technical institute.

Private Schools:

- Colegio Marista «El Salvador», Manatí
- Colegio De La Inmaculada
- Piaget Bilingual Academy
- Academia Discípulos de Cristo
- Higher Education Academy
- La Reiné Christian Bilingual School

Manatí's only university is the American University of Puerto Rico, Manatí Campus. There are several technical institutes, such as Instituto de Banca y Comercio, Atenas College, EDP College and Dewey University.

== Transportation ==
There are 15 bridges in Manatí.

== Culture ==
=== Festivals and events ===
Manatí celebrates its patron saint festival in February. The Fiestas Patronales Virgen de la Candelaria is a religious and cultural celebration that generally features parades, games, artisans, amusement rides, regional food, and live entertainment.

Other festivals and events celebrated in Manatí include:

- Los Tubos beach festival – June/July
- Mar Chiquita festival – June
- Christmas festival – December

=== Radio stations ===
- WMNT (AM) - Radio Atenas 1500 AM
- WNRT FM - Triunfo 96.9 FM

== Notable natives and residents ==
Notable people from Manatí include:

- Cecilia Callejo, dancer and actress
- José Miguel Class, singer
- Noel Cuevas, professional baseball player
- Manuel Ramos Otero, poet and LGBT activist
- Carlos Santana Becerra, judge
- Yara Sofia, drag queen
- Antonio Vélez Alvarado, father of the Puerto Rican flag
- Joaquín Rosa Gómez, constitutional framer and politician
- Carlos Beltrán, Professional Baseball Outfielder
- Neftalí Soto, Professional Baseball Player
- Iván Rodríguez, Professional Baseball Player
- José Valentin, Professional Baseball Player
- Luis Daniel Rivera, actor and politician

== Gallery ==
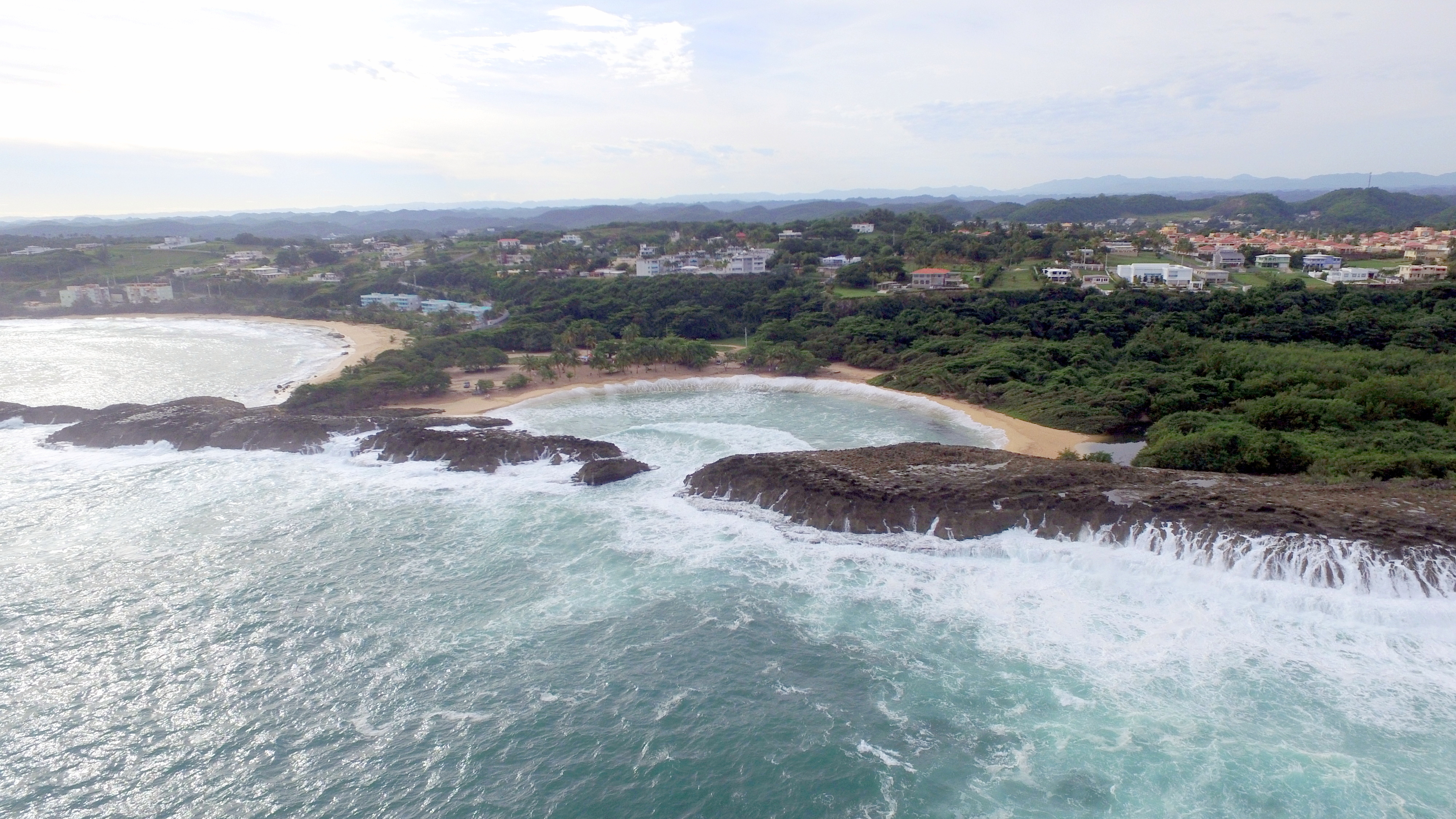
Mar Chiquita beach and bay in Manatí

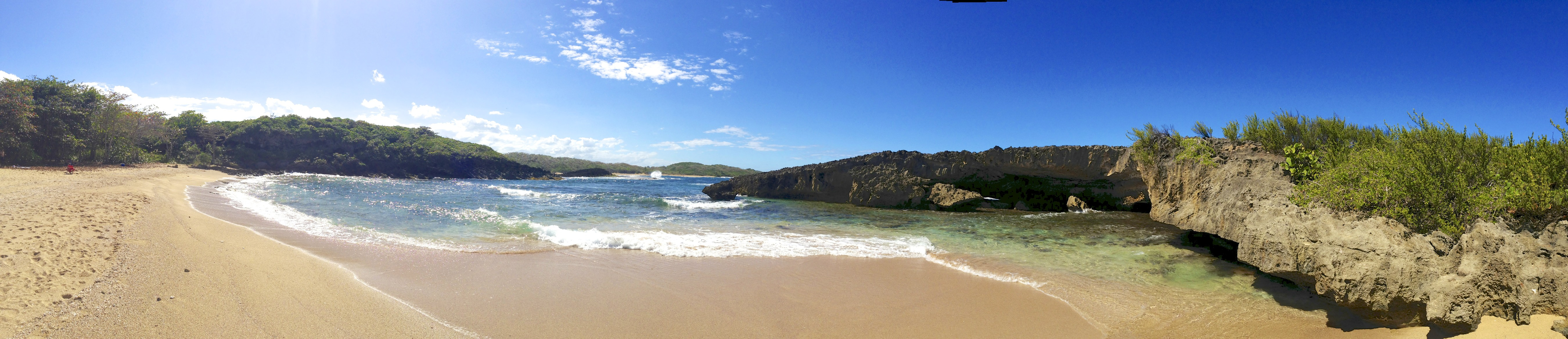
Cueva de las Golondrinas

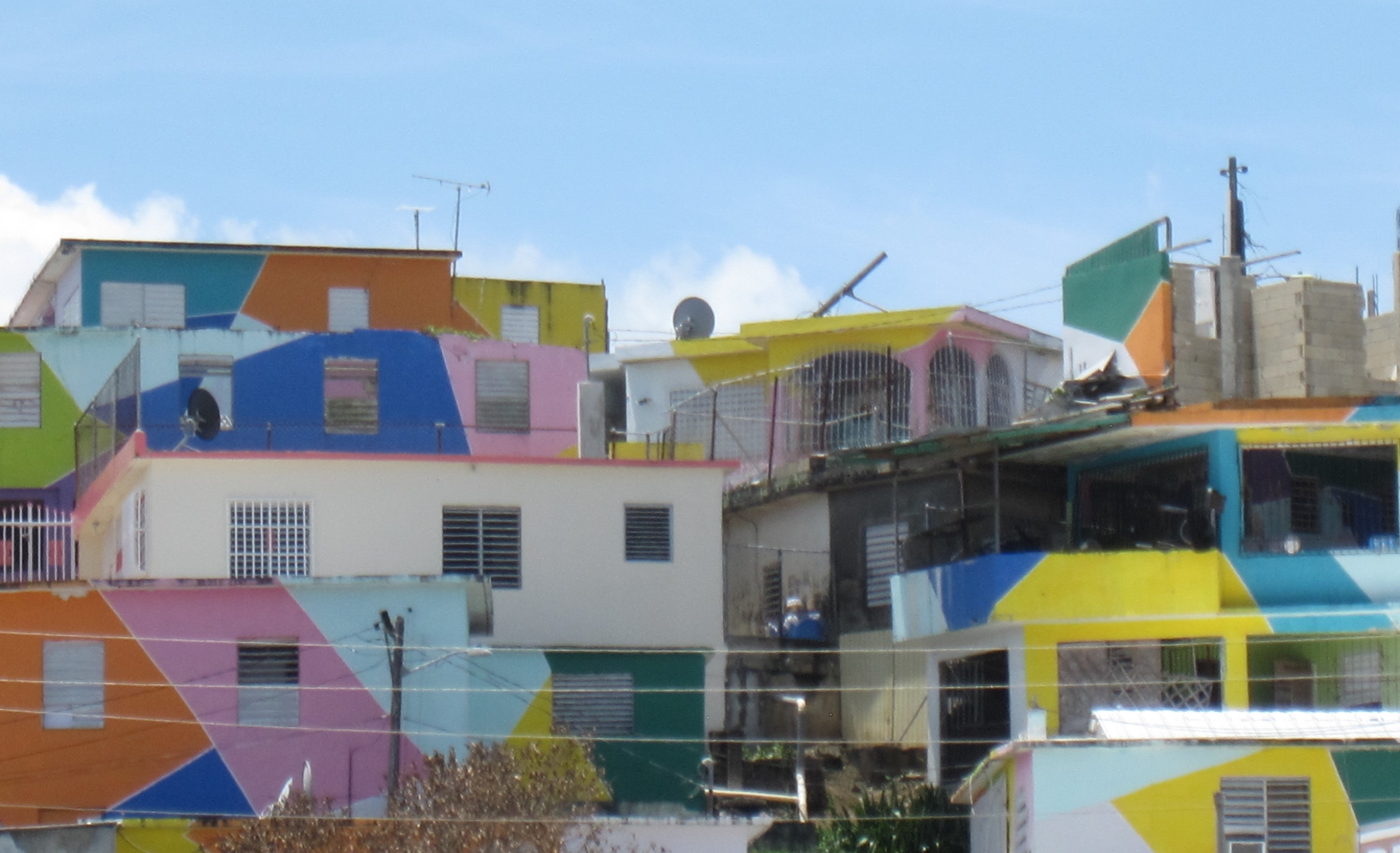
Buildings near the Manatí barrio-pueblo

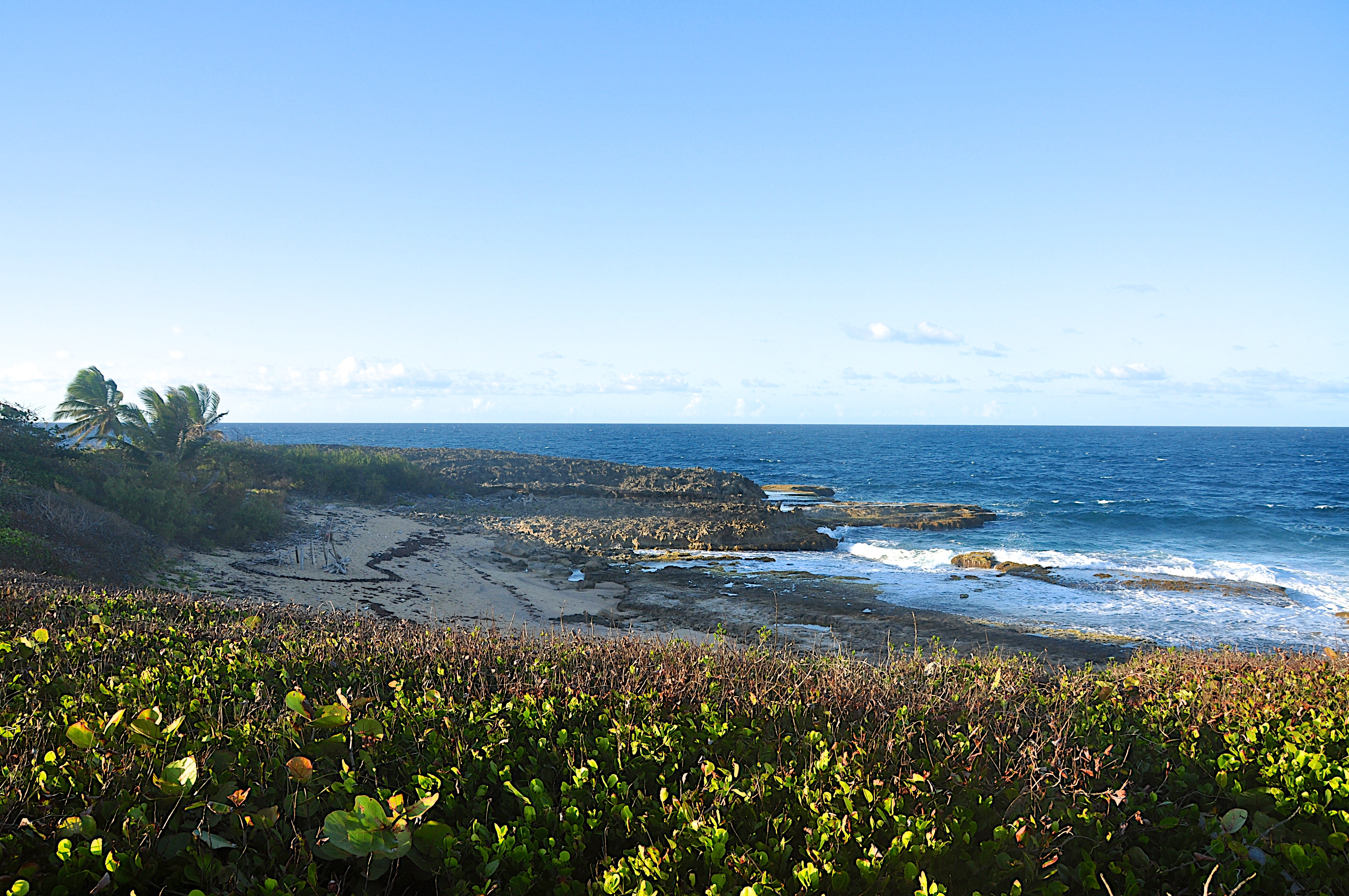
Beach in Manatí

== See also ==
- List of Puerto Ricans
- History of Puerto Rico
- Did you know-Puerto Rico?
