= Bajura Afuera =

Barrio of Manatí, Puerto Rico

- Barrio
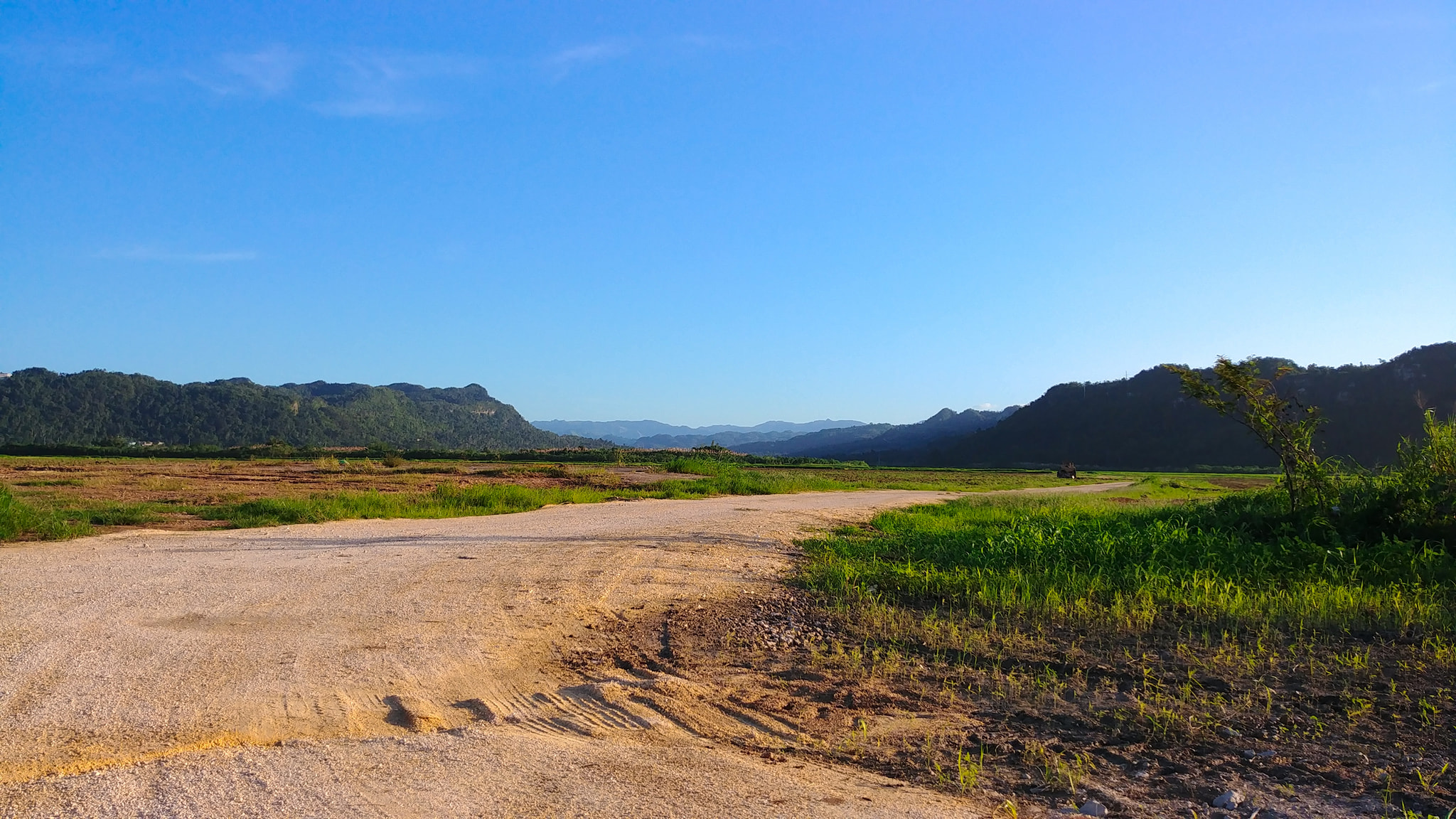
- Manatí Valley in Bajura Afuera

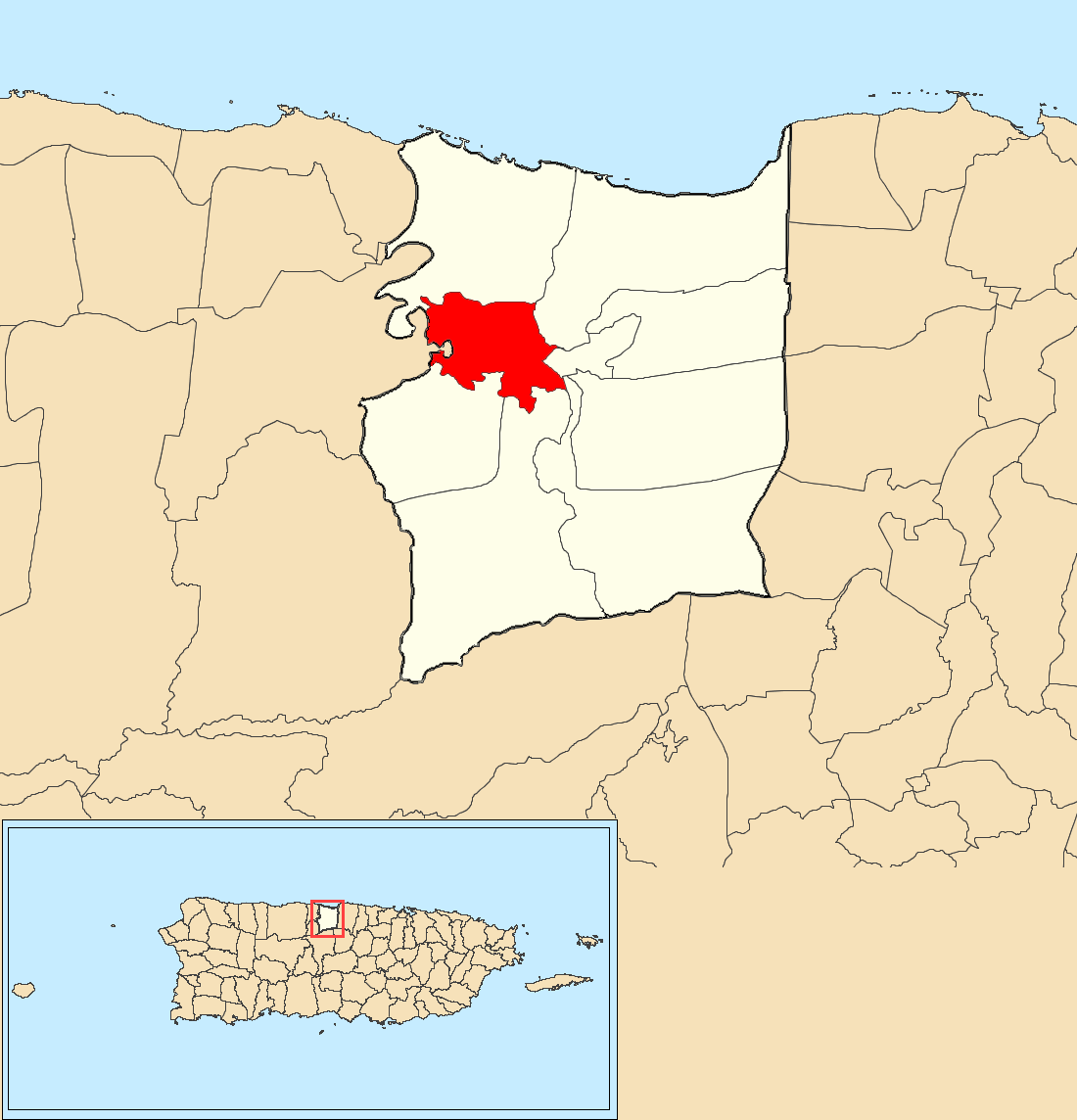
- Location of Bajura Afuera within the municipality of Manatí shown in red

- Location of Puerto Rico
- Coordinates: 18°26′07″N 66°31′07″W
- Commonwealth: Puerto Rico
- Municipality: Manatí

Area
  - Total: 2.64 sq mi (6.8 km^{2})
  - Land: 2.54 sq mi (6.6 km^{2})
  - Water: 0.10 sq mi (0.26 km^{2})
- Elevation: 23 ft (7.0 m)

Population (2010)
  - Total: 677
  - Density: 267.6/sq mi (103.3/km^{2})
- Source: 2010 Census
- Time zone: UTC−4 (AST)
- ZIP Code: 00674
- Area code: 787/939

Bajura Afuera is a rural barrio with an urban zone in the municipality of Manatí, Puerto Rico. Its population in 2010 was 677.

Historical population
Census	Pop.	Note	%±
1900	739		—
1910	1,198		62.1%
1920	635		−47.0%
1930	931		46.6%
1940	1,567		68.3%
1950	467		−70.2%
1960	371		−20.6%
1970	294		−20.8%
1980	262		−10.9%
1990	469		79.0%
2000	737		57.1%
2010	677		−8.1%
U.S. Decennial Census; 1899 (shown as 1900) 1910-1930; 1930-1950 1980-2000 2010

== History ==
Bajura Afuera was in Spain's gazetteers until Puerto Rico was ceded by Spain in the aftermath of the Spanish–American War under the terms of the Treaty of Paris of 1898 and became an unincorporated territory of the United States. In 1899, the United States Department of War conducted a census of Puerto Rico finding that the population of Bajura Afuera barrio was 739.

== See also ==
- List of communities in Puerto Rico
