= WMNT (AM) =

- Manati, Puerto Rico; Puerto Rico
- Broadcast area: Puerto Rico
- Frequency: 1500 kHz
- Branding: Radio Atenas 1500

Programming
- Format: News Talk/Latin Pop
- Affiliations: Radio Paz (Fuego Cruzado)

Ownership
- Owner: Manati Radio Corporation; (Manati Radio & Media LLC)
- Sister stations: WMLD-FM 96.9 until 1986

History
- First air date: December 15, 1959
- Call sign meaning: MaNaTi

Technical information
- Licensing authority: FCC
- Facility ID: 39772
- Class: B
- Power: 10,200 watts
- Transmitter coordinates: 18°25′59″N 66°16′22″W

Links
- Public license information: Public file; LMS
- Webcast: Listen Live
- Website: radioatenas1500.net

WMNT (1500 kHz) is an AM radio station broadcasting a News Talk Information and Latin Pop radio format. Licensed to Manati, Puerto Rico, the station is currently owned by Jose Ribas Reyes (Manati Radio Corporation), through licensee Manati Radio & Media LLC. The call sign letters are the consonants of its city of license and location, Manati.

== History ==
Former logo

WMNT-AM was founded in 1959 by Pedro Collazo Barbosa and Efrain Archilla Roig. On April 5, 1958, a construction permit was applied by the Arecibo Broadcasting Corporation, Inc. for a new standard broadcast station to be operated on the 1500kc frequency with 250w power. On July 29, 1959 it was granted and on December 15, 1959 it was officially inaugurated. On May 24, 1982, WMNT-AM "Radio Atenas" was sold along with its sister station WMLD-FM, then known as Ritmo 97 to La Voz Evangelica de Puerto Rico, Inc., a religious group. The new owners changed the name of WMNT-AM to "Radio Aleluya" and WMLD-FM to "Radio Triunfo", changing both to a Christian format. On May 18, 1986, Mr. Pedro Collazo reacquired WMNT-AM, changing its brand again to "Radio Atenas" and its programming back to its original format, while WMLD-FM remained owned by La Voz Evangelica de Puerto Rico, Inc. and changed its call sign to WNRT-FM. In the late 1990s, WMNT-AM was acquired by Jose Ribas Dominicci. In February 2020 after the death of Ribas Dominicci his son, Jose Ribas Reyes, assumed control of the station.
