= Antonio Vélez Alvarado =

Father of the Puerto Rican Flag and co-founder of Puerto Rican Nationalist Party

- Co-founder of the Puerto Rican Nationalist Party
- Born: June 12, 1864; Manatí, Puerto Rico
- Died: January 16, 1948 (aged 83); Manatí, Puerto Rico
- Political party: Puerto Rican Nationalist Party
- Movement: Puerto Rican Independence

Notes
- Vélez Alvarado is known as the "Prócer Que Creó Bandera Patria" (The Father of the Puerto Rican Flag)

Antonio Vélez Alvarado (June 12, 1864 – January 16, 1948) was a Puerto Rican journalist, politician and revolutionary who was an advocate of Puerto Rican independence. He is also known as "the Father of the Puerto Rican Flag". A close friend of Cuban patriot José Martí, Vélez Alvarado joined the Puerto Rican Revolutionary Committee in New York City and is among those who allegedly designed the Flag of Puerto Rico. Vélez Alvarado was one of the founding fathers of the Puerto Rican Nationalist Party.

== Early years ==
Vélez Alvarado was born in the town of Manatí in Puerto Rico to José María Vélez Escobar and Cecilia Alvarado Rodríguez. There he received his primary and secondary education. His family were the wealthy owners of various farms in Manati. His father, a former Captain in the local militia, wanted to send him to study at the Artillery Academy in Toledo, Spain, hoping that his son would follow in his foot steps with a military career. However, Vélez Alvarado wanted to be a writer.

== Puerto Rican Independence ==
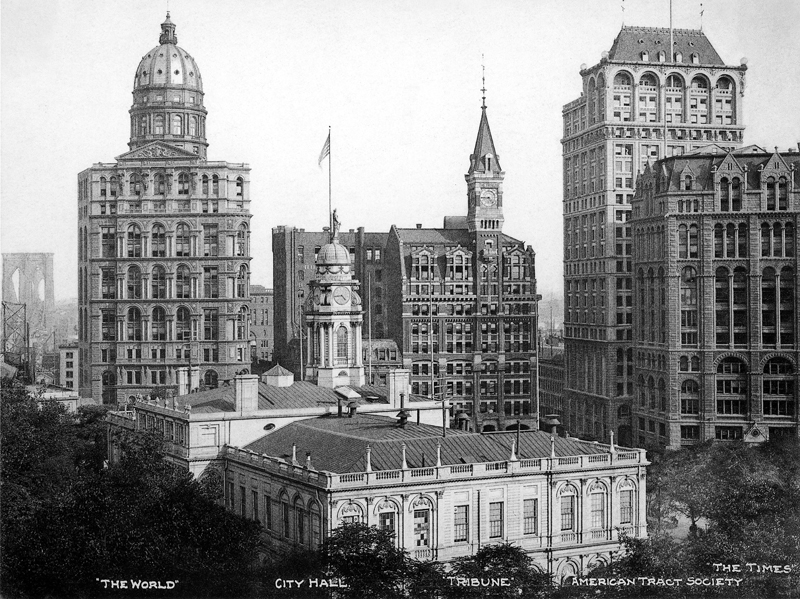
N. Y. World Building (c. 1906) at left, where Vélez Alvarado had his printing facility

Vélez Alvarado began writing in 1881, for "El Criterio" in Humacao under the name of "Yuri". He later wrote for "La Crónica" in Ponce, "La Propaganda" in Mayagüez and "El Agente" in San Juan. In his articles he expressed his ideals in regard to Puerto Rican independence from Spain. The local Spanish authorities' tolerated his written work out of respect for his father, however in 1887, he was exiled from the island. Vélez Alvarado went to New York City, where he met and befriended the Cuban revolutionary leader José Martí. He also befriended Louis Weiss owner of a printing press. He used Weiss's facilities to publish two magazines, the "Revista Popular" and the "Gaceta del Pueblo". He used the latter to publish articles related to politics and the Cuban and Puerto Rican revolutionary movements. He also published some of Martí's written works. It was not long before Vélez Alvarado was able to establish his own printing facility in the seventh floor of the New York World Building.

On February 24, 1892, Vélez Alvarado together with Sotero Figueroa, Francisco Gonzalo Marín and Modesto A. Tira placed an ad in the newspaper "El Porvenir" calling for a meeting amongst those who believed in the independence cause. A result of this meeting was the founding of the "Club Borinquen", a political organization in favor of Puerto Rico's independence.

== Design of the Puerto Rican flag ==
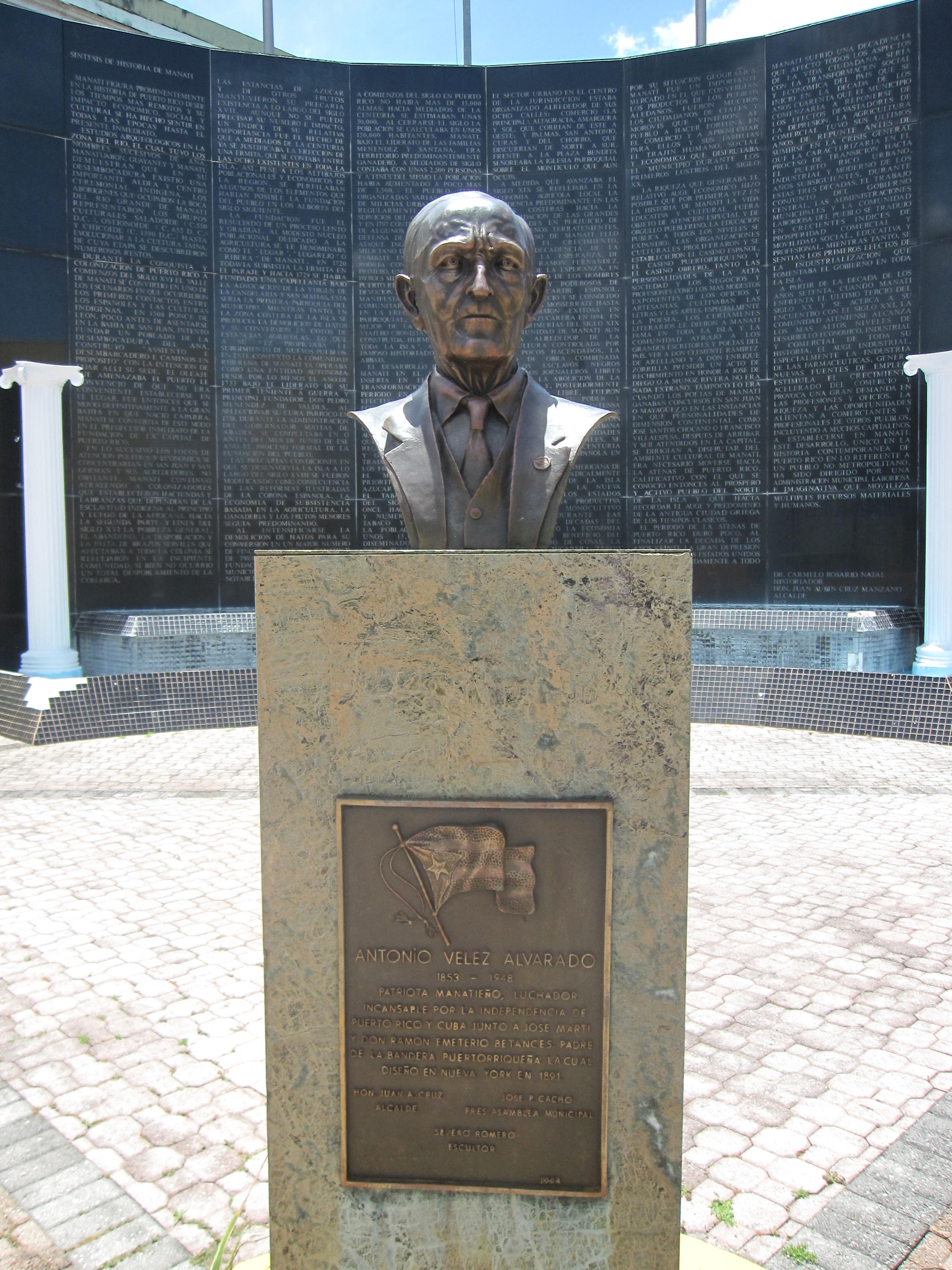
Bust of Antonio Vélez Alvarado and monument in Manatí barrio-pueblo

According to some accounts on June 12, 1892, Vélez Alvarado was at his apartment at 219 Twenty-Third Street in Manhattan, when he stared at a Cuban flag for a few minutes, and then took a look at the blank wall in which it was being displayed. Vélez Alvarado suddenly perceived an optical illusion, in which he perceived the image of the Cuban flag with the colors in the flag's triangle and stripes inverted. Almost immediately he visited a nearby merchant, Domingo Peraza, from whom he bought some crepe paper to build a crude prototype. He later displayed his prototype in a dinner meeting at his neighbor's house, where the owner, Micaela Dalmau vda. de Carreras, had invited José Martí as a guest. Martí was pleasantly impressed by the prototype, and made note of it in a newspaper article published in the Cuban revolutionary newspaper Patria, published on July 2 of that year. Acceptance of the prototype was slow in coming, but grew with time.

Francisco Gonzalo Marín, who decided to have a proper flag sewn based on the prototype, presented the new flag's design in New York's "Chimney Corner Hall" a gathering place of independence advocates two years later. The Puerto Rican Flag (with the light blue triangle) soon came to symbolize the ideals of the Puerto Rican independence movement.

Other sources document Gonzalo Marín with presenting a Puerto Rican flag prototype in 1895 for adoption by the Puerto Rican Revolutionary Committee in New York City. Marín has since been credited by some with the flag's design. There is a letter written by Juan de Mata Terreforte which gives credit to Marin. The original contents of the letter in Spanish are the following:

La adopción de la bandera cubana con los colores invertidos me fue sugerida por el insigne patriota Francisco Gonzalo Marín en una carta que me escribió desde Jamaica. Yo hice la proposición a los patriotas puertorriqueños que asistieron al mitin de Chimney Hall y fue aprobada unánimemente.

Which translated in English states the following:

The adaptation of the Cuban flag with the colors inverted was suggested by the patriot Francisco Gonzalo Marín in a letter which he wrote from Jamaica. I made the proposition to various Puerto Rican patriots during a meeting at Chimney Hall and it was approved unanimously.

Plus, in a letter written by Maria Manuela (Mima) Besosa, the daughter of the Puerto Rican Revolutionary Committee member Manuel Besosa, she stated that she sewed the flag. This created a belief that her father could have been its designer.

It may never be known who really designed the current flag, however what is known is that on December 22, 1895, the Puerto Rican Revolutionary Committee officially adopted the design which represents the current flag.

Comparison of the Cuban and Puerto Rican flags
Flag of Cuba	Flag of Puerto Rico (1892)

== Puerto Rican Nationalist Party ==
Puerto Rico never gained its independence, instead it was annexed by the United States under the terms of the Treaty of Paris of 1898, ratified on December 10, 1898, which put an end to the Spanish–American War.

Because of his business obligations in New York, Vélez Alvarado was unable to return to Puerto Rico until 1917. Upon his return, he joined the Puerto Rican Union Party headed by Antonio R. Barceló, which advocated the independence of Puerto Rico.

By 1919, Vélez Alvarado together with José Coll y Cuchí felt that the Union Party was not doing enough for the cause of Puerto Rico and together with some followers departed from the party and formed the Nationalist Association of Puerto Rico in San Juan. During that time, there were two other organizations that were pro-independence, the Nationalist Youth and the Independence Association. On September 17, 1922, the three political organizations joined forces and formed the Puerto Rican Nationalist Party. Coll y Cuchi was elected president, José S. Alegría (father of Ricardo Alegría) vice-president and Vélez Alvarado was elected to the Supreme Counsel of the party.

== Legacy ==
The President of the Puerto Rican Nationalist Party, Pedro Albizu Campos, was among those who were present when Vélez Alvarado died on January 16, 1948, in his home in Manatí. Vélez Alvarado is buried in the "Antiguo Cementerio Municipal" in Manatí, Puerto Rico. In the Plaza de la Historia, located in the Calle (Street) Patriota Pozo of Manati, there is a bronze bust of Vélez Alvarado. The Government of Puerto Rico honored his memory by naming a public school in Manati the "Antonio Velez Alvarado School".

== See also ==
- List of Puerto Ricans
- Puerto Rican Nationalist Party
- Ponce massacre
- Río Piedras massacre
- Jayuya Uprising
- Utuado Uprising
- Truman assassination attempt
- Puerto Rican Independence Party
- History of Puerto Rico
