= Puerto Rico Highway 6685 =

Highway in Puerto Rico

Highway 6685
- Ruta 6685

Route information
- Maintained by Puerto Rico DTPW
- Length: 11.9 km (7.4 mi)

Major junctions
- South end: PR-146 in Hato Viejo–Cordillera
- PR-632 in Hato Viejo; PR-6633 in Hato Viejo; PR-643 in Río Arriba Saliente; PR-642 in Río Arriba Saliente
- North end: PR-2 in Manatí barrio-pueblo

Location
- Country: United States
- Territory: Puerto Rico
- Municipalities: Ciales, Manatí

Highway system
- Roads in Puerto Rico; List
← PR-6633	→ PR-6690

Puerto Rico Highway 6685 (PR-6685) is a rural highway in Puerto Rico that runs south to north, connecting the towns of Ciales and Manatí on Puerto Rico's north coast. It runs slightly parallel to Puerto Rico Highway 149 until it ends at Puerto Rico Highway 2 in Manatí. It has a junction with PR-149 in Ciales and with Puerto Rico Highway 642 in Río Arriba Saliente barrio, in Manatí.

Puerto Rico Highway 6685 by municipality

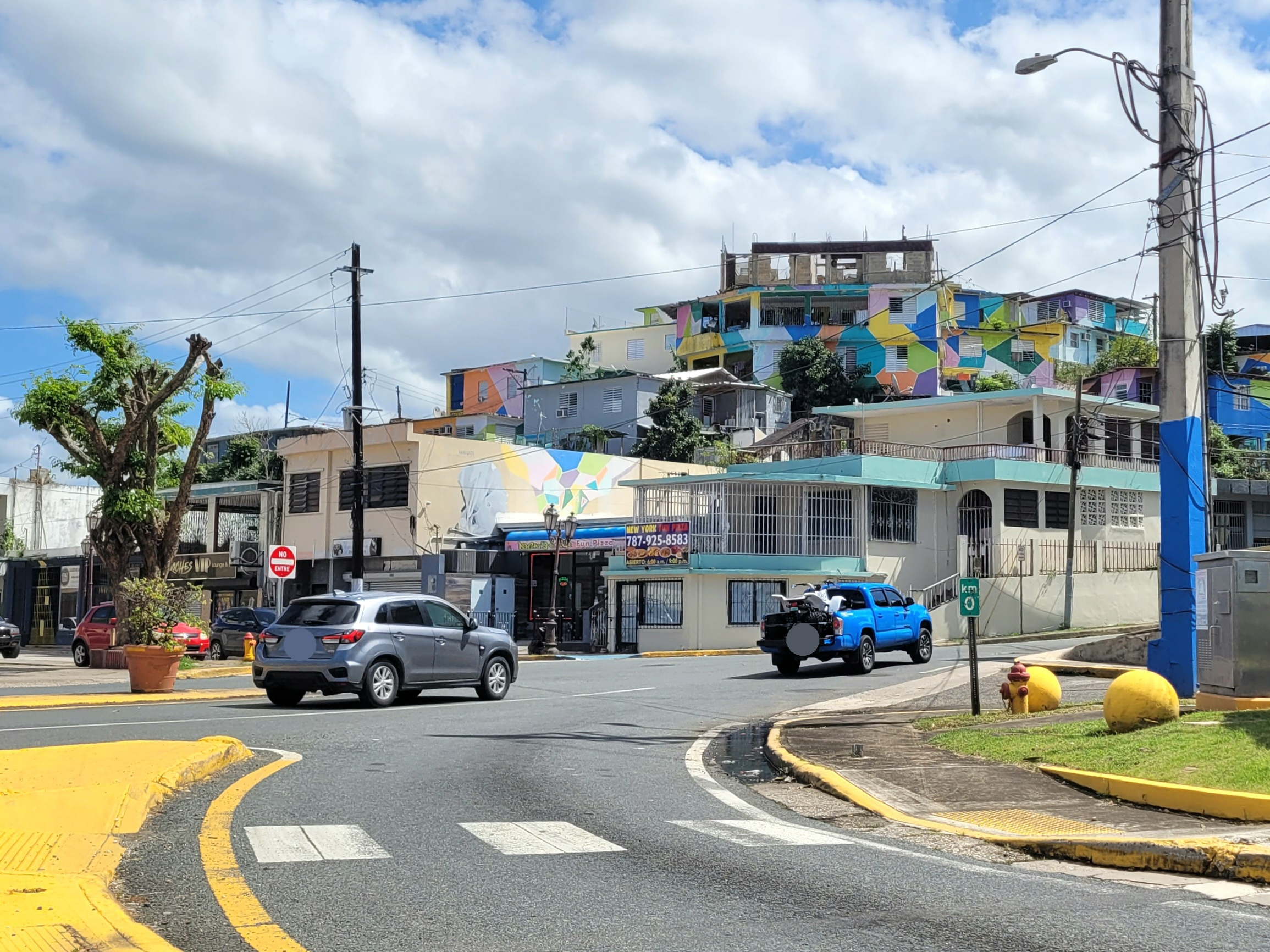
Northern terminus at PR-2 junction in downtown Manatí, looking south

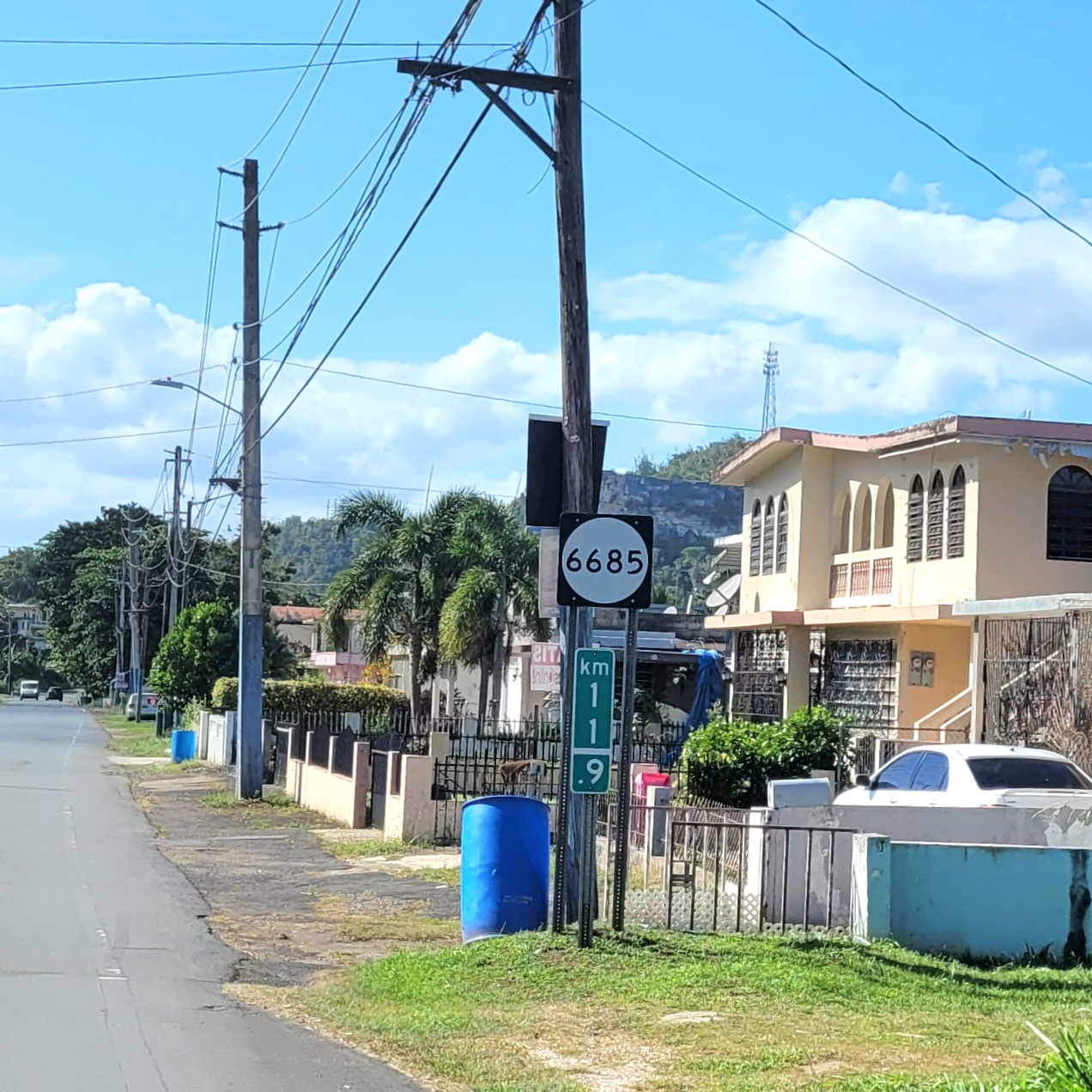
Heading north between Cordillera and Hato Viejo barrios in Ciales

== Major intersections ==
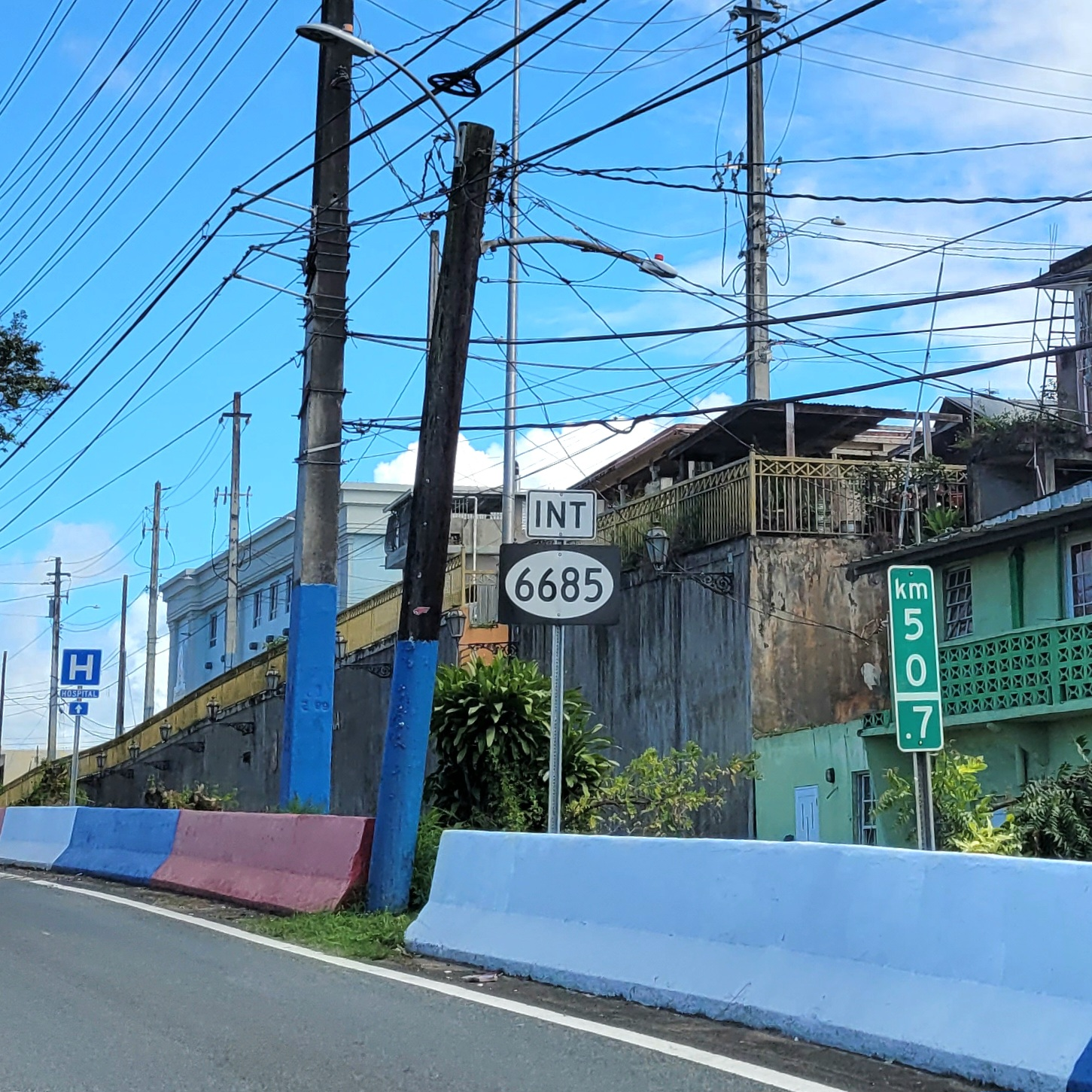
PR-2 east near the northern terminus of PR-6685 in downtown Manatí

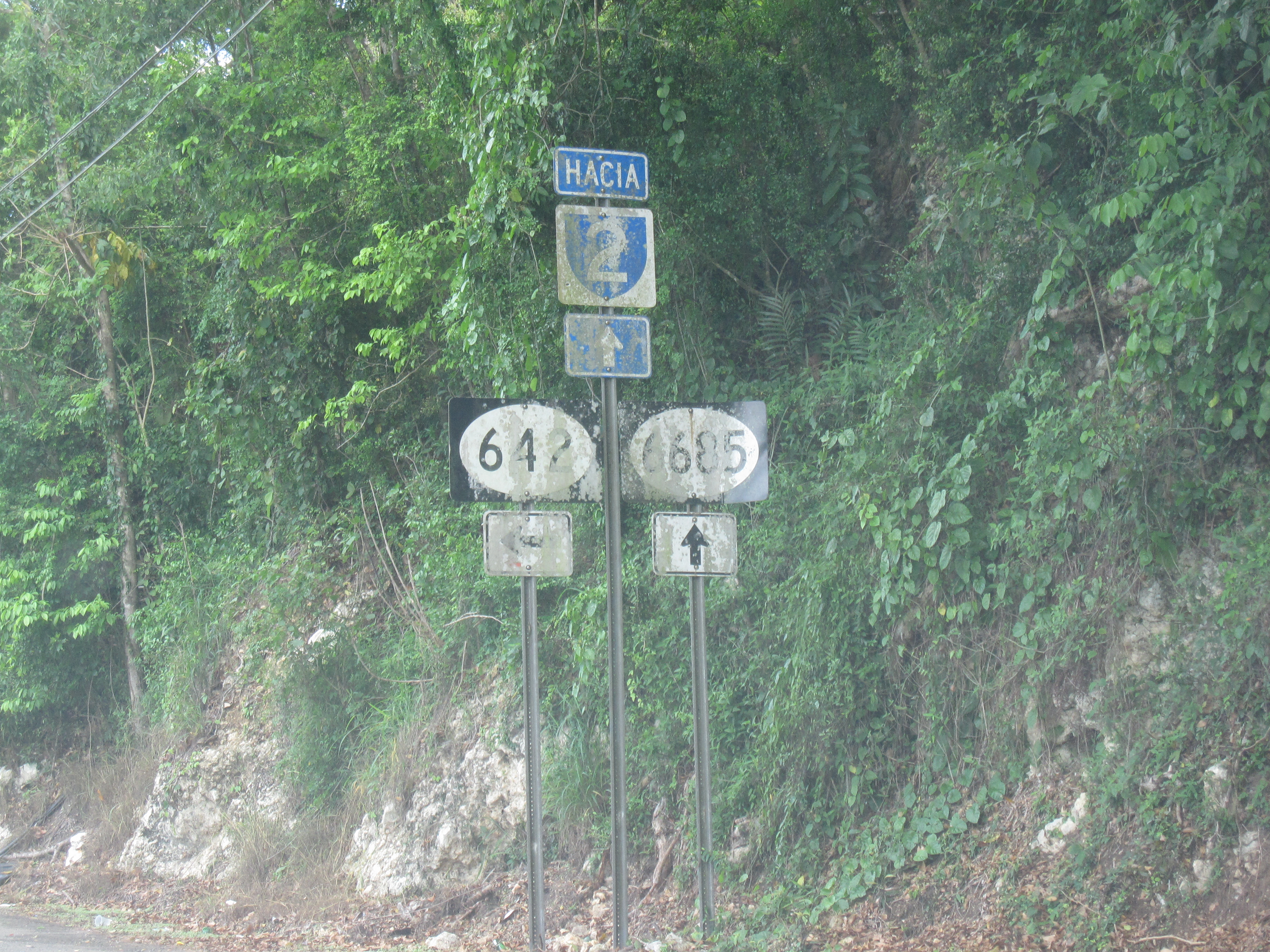
PR-6685 heading north to PR-2 at PR-642 intersection in Río Arriba Saliente, Manatí

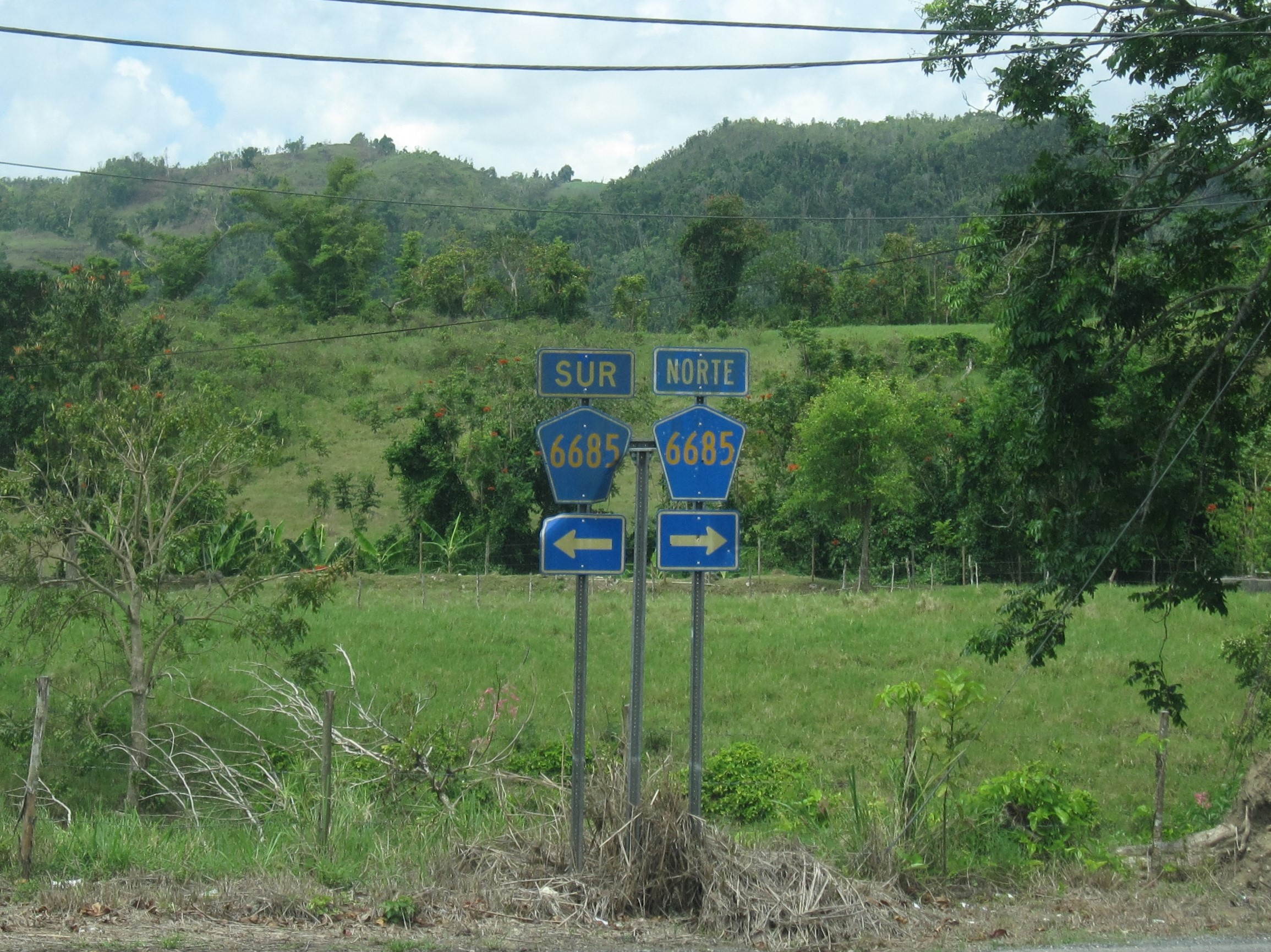
Signs for PR-6685 south and north at the western terminus of PR-643 in Río Arriba Saliente, Manatí

Municipality	Location	km	mi	Destinations	Notes
Ciales	Hato Viejo–Cordillera line	11.9	7.4	PR-146 – Ciales, Utuado	Southern terminus of PR-6685
Ciales	Hato Viejo	10.1	6.3	PR-632 – Hato Viejo	
Ciales	Hato Viejo	9.8– 9.7	6.1– 6.0	Puente Mata de Plátano over the Río Grande de Manatí	
Ciales	Hato Viejo	8.8	5.5	PR-6633 east to PR-149 (Carretera Fernando "Nando" Otero Sánchez) – Ciales, Morovis	
Manatí	Río Arriba Saliente	6.6	4.1	PR-643 to PR-149 (Carretera Fernando "Nando" Otero Sánchez) – Manatí, Vega Baja	
Manatí	Río Arriba Saliente	4.4	2.7	PR-642 west – Florida	
Manatí	Manatí barrio-pueblo	0.0	0.0	PR-2 (Bulevar Antonio Vélez Alvarado) – San Juan, Arecibo	Northern terminus of PR-6685
1.000 mi = 1.609 km; 1.000 km = 0.621 mi
