= Puerto Rico Highway 146 =

Highway in Puerto Rico

Highway 146
- Ruta 146

Route information
- Maintained by Puerto Rico DTPW
- Length: 28.3 km (17.6 mi)

Major junctions
- West end: PR-123 in Río Arriba
- PR-140 in Frontón; PR-608 in Frontón; PR-649 in Cordillera; PR-6685 in Hato Viejo–Cordillera
- East end: PR-145 / PR-149 in Jaguas

Location
- Country: United States
- Territory: Puerto Rico
- Municipalities: Arecibo, Utuado, Ciales

Highway system
- Roads in Puerto Rico; List
← PR-145	→ PR-147

Puerto Rico Highway 146 (PR-146) is a road that travels from Arecibo, Puerto Rico to Ciales. This highway begins at PR-123 near Dos Bocas Lake and ends at its junction with PR-145 and PR-149 in downtown Ciales.

Puerto Rico Highway 146

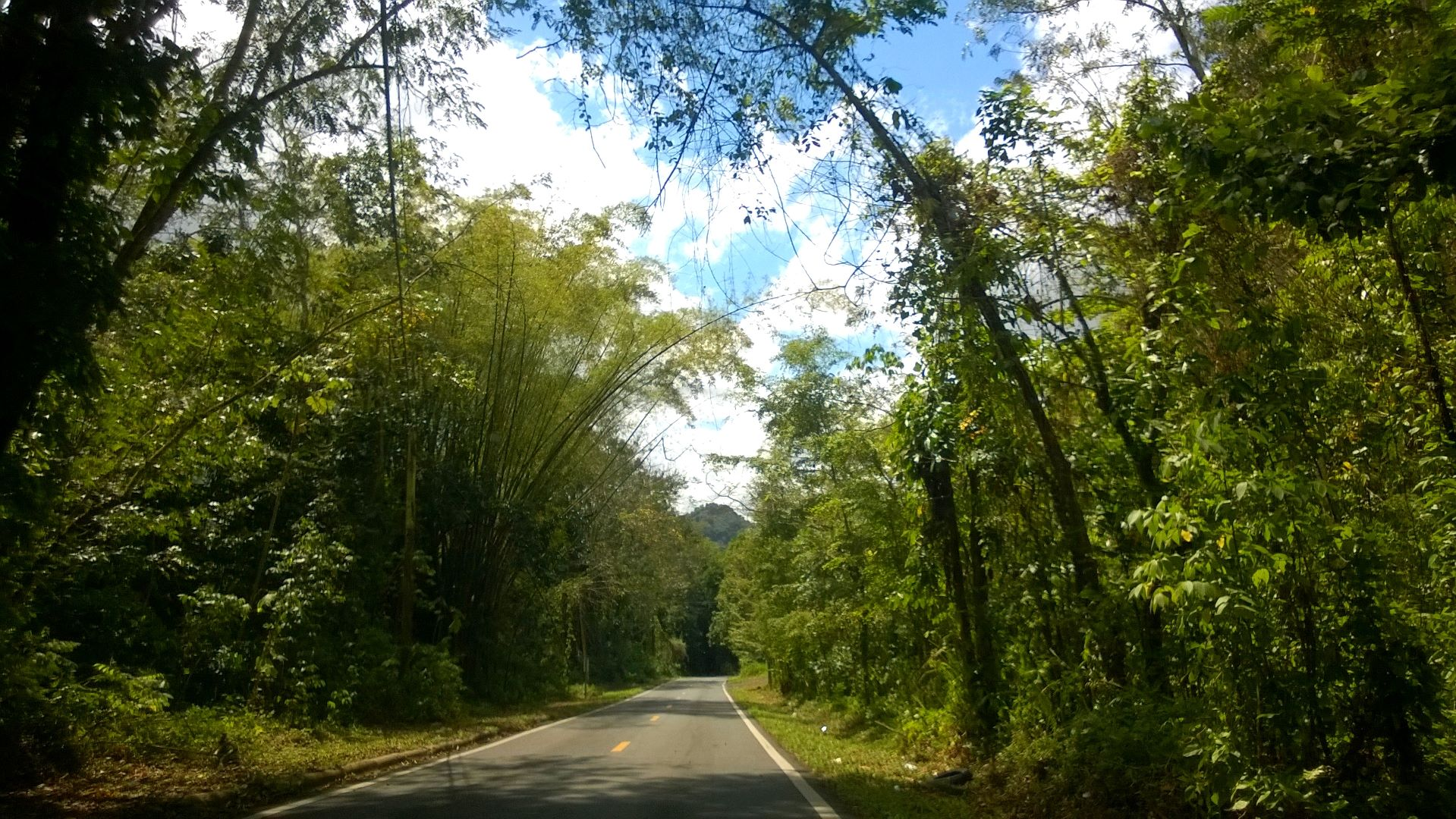
Heading west in Frontón, Ciales

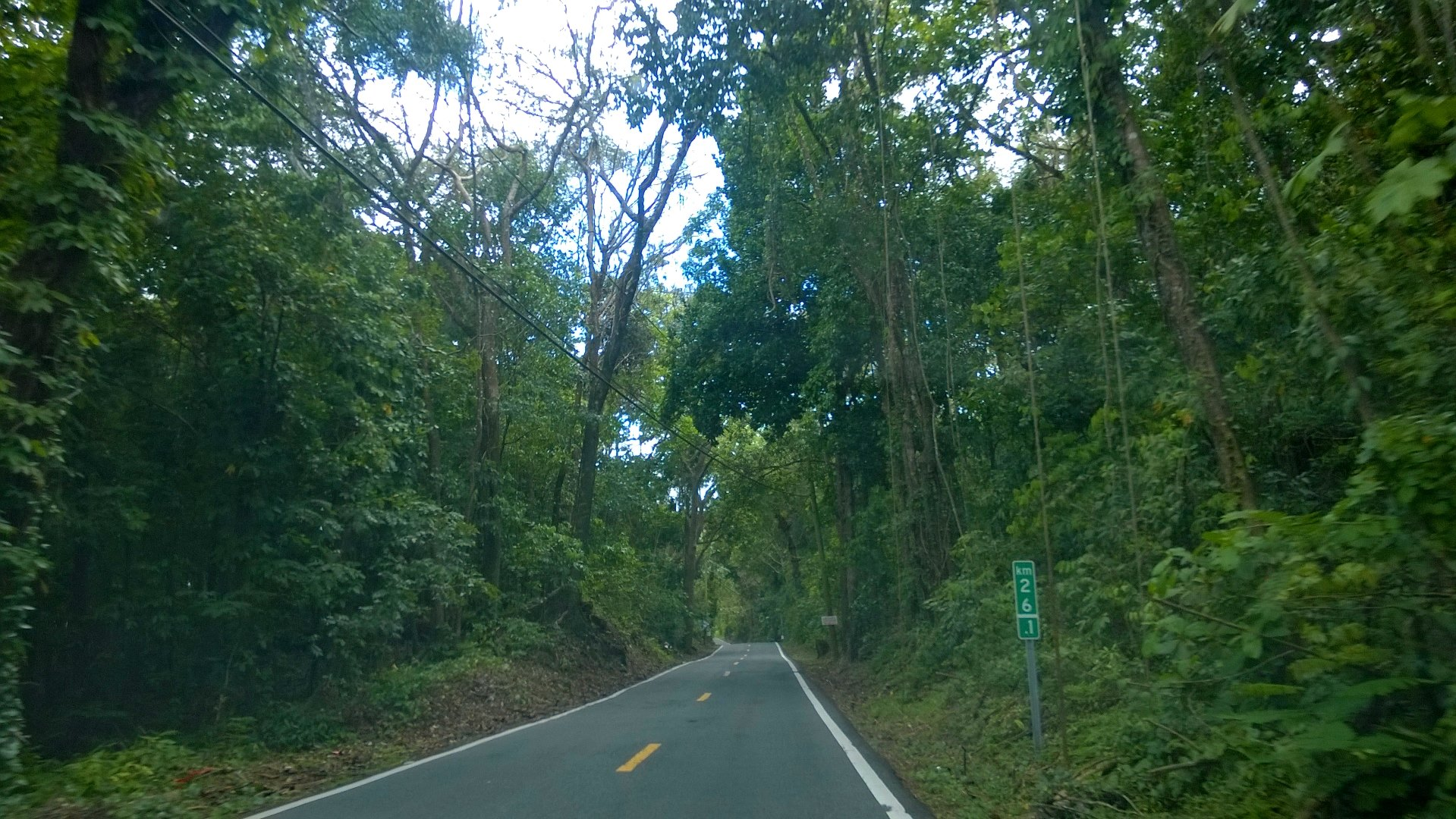
Heading west in Cordillera, Ciales

== Major intersections ==
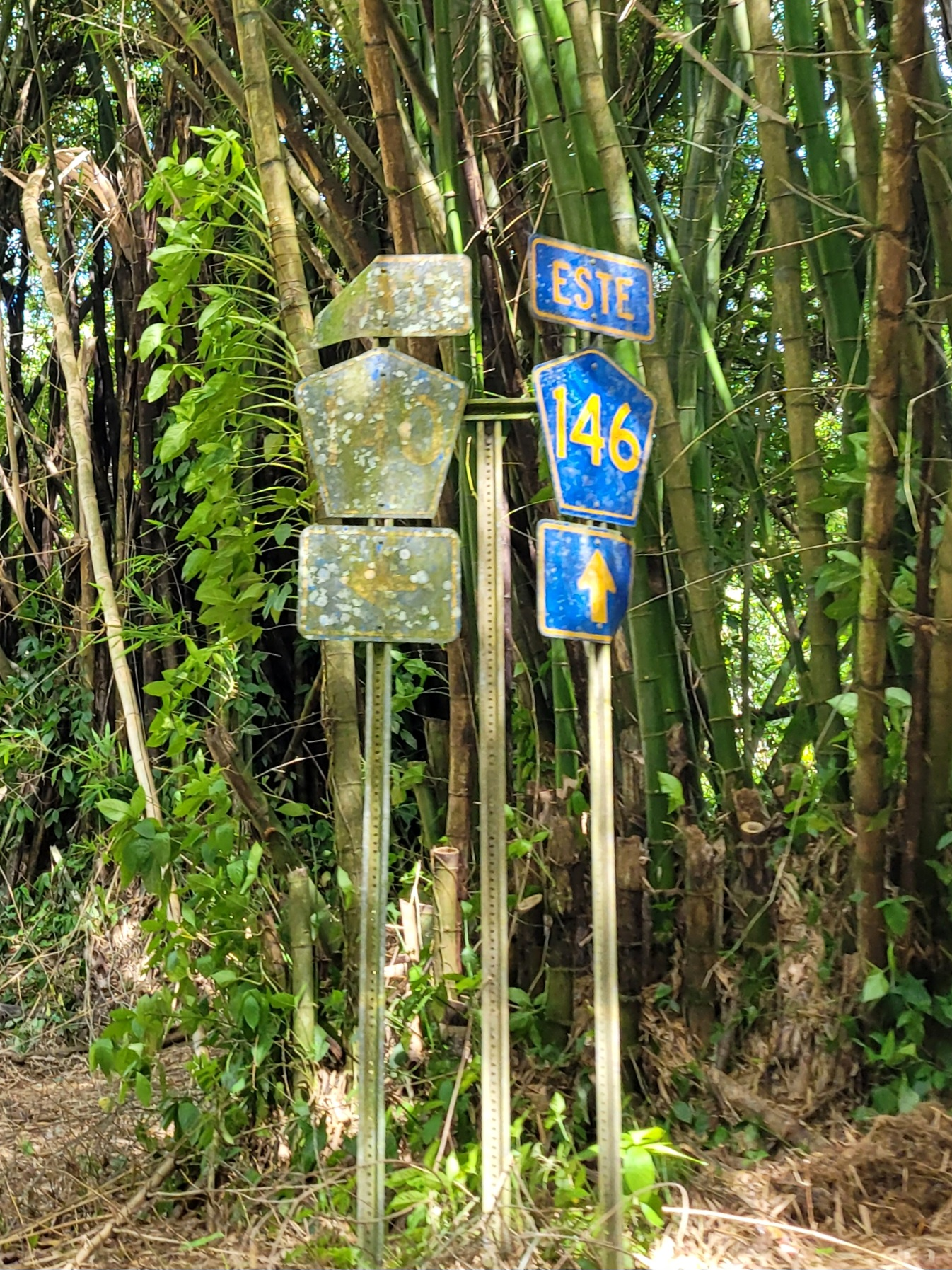
PR-146 east at the eastern terminus of PR-140 concurrency in Frontón, Ciales

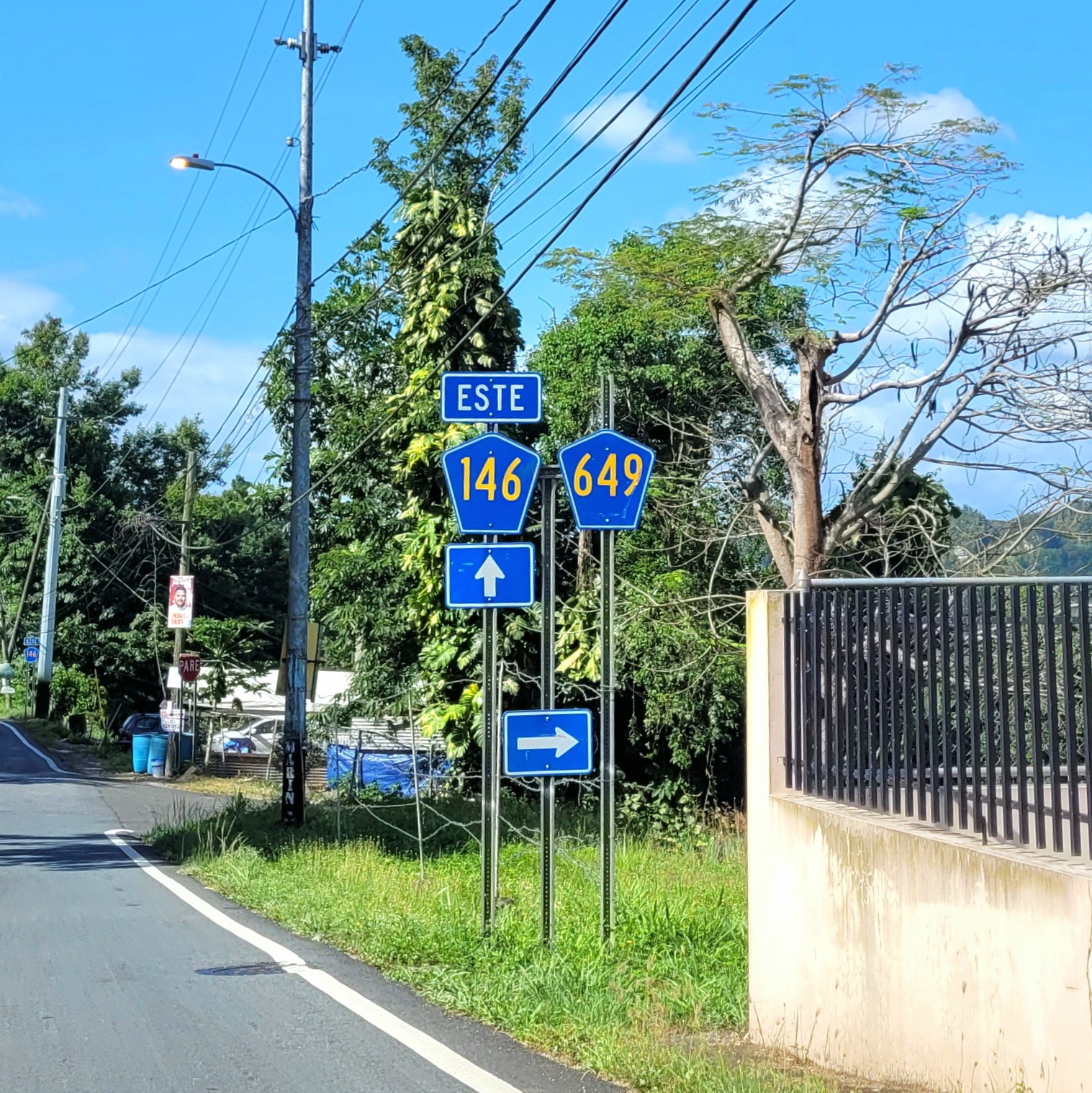
PR-146 east at PR-649 intersection in Cordillera, Ciales

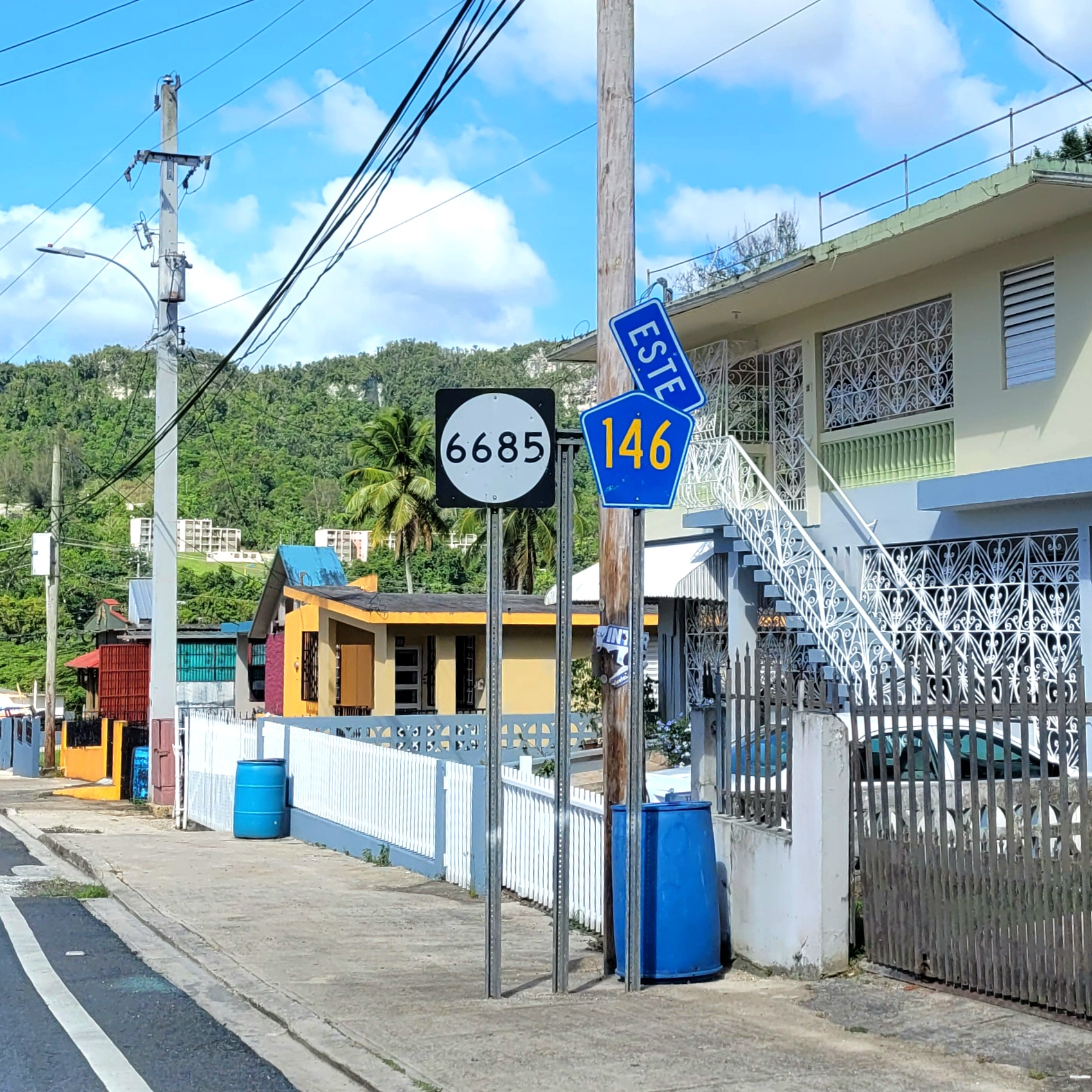
PR-146 east at PR-6685 intersection between Cordillera and Hato Viejo barrios in Ciales

Municipality	Location	km	mi	Destinations	Notes
Arecibo	Río Arriba	0.0	0.0	PR-123 – Arecibo, Utuado	Western terminus of PR-146
Utuado	No major junctions				
Ciales	Frontón	11.0	6.8	PR-140 south – Utuado, Jayuya	Western terminus of PR-140 concurrency
Ciales	Frontón	11.3	7.0	PR-140 north – Florida, Barceloneta	Eastern terminus of PR-140 concurrency
Ciales	Frontón	17.5	10.9	PR-608 – Cialitos	
Ciales	Cordillera	26.8	16.7	PR-649 east – Ciales	
Ciales	Hato Viejo–Cordillera line	28.0	17.4	PR-6685 – Manatí	
Ciales	Jaguas	28.3	17.6	PR-149 – Ciales, Manatí	Eastern terminus of PR-146 and western terminus of PR-145
Ciales	Jaguas	28.3	17.6	PR-145 east (Carretera Juan "Pachín" Vicéns) – Morovis	Continuation beyond PR-149
1.000 mi = 1.609 km; 1.000 km = 0.621 mi: Concurrency terminus
