= List of barrios and sectors of Ciales, Puerto Rico =

Like all municipalities of Puerto Rico, Ciales is subdivided into administrative units called barrios, which are, in contemporary times, roughly comparable to minor civil divisions. The barrios and subbarrios, in turn, are further subdivided into smaller local populated place areas/units called sectores (sectors in English). The types of sectores may vary, from normally sector to urbanización to reparto to barriada to residencial, among others.

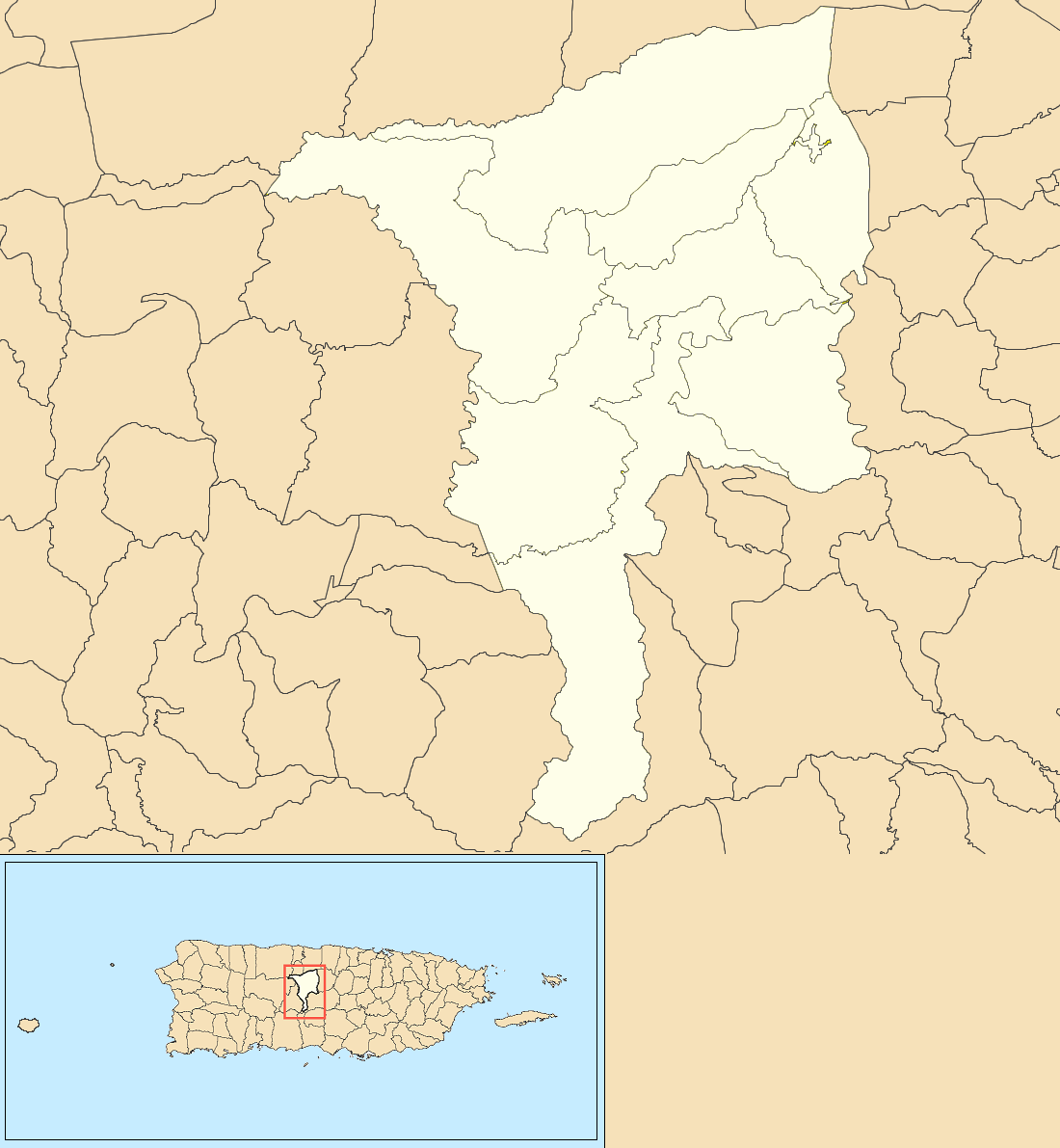
Ciales map with barrio subdivisions

== List of sectors by barrio ==
=== Ciales barrio-pueblo ===
- Barriada La Aldea
- Barriada La Cuerda
- Barriada Otero
- Barriada Santo Domingo
- Barriada Verdum
- Calle Morovis
- Calle Nueva
- Comunidad Cuba
- Comunidad Los Milagros
- Residencial Colinas de Jaguas
- Residencial Fernando Sierra Berdecía
- Sector Las Guabas

=== Cialitos ===
- Atrecho
- Hacienda Flor de Alba
- La Quinta
- Las Cañas
- Los Figueroa
- Los López
- Mameyes
- Parcelas Cialitos
- Parcelas Toño Colon
- Portón
- Sector Los Naturópatas

=== Cordillera ===
- Barriada Los Rosario
- Camino Los Pagán
- Carretera 146
- Comunidad Ortega
- Comunidad Villalobos
- Parcelas Alturas de Cordillera (Parcelas Nuevas)
- Parcelas Cordillera
- Sector El Cinco
- Sector El Seis
- Sector El Siete
- Sector El Tres
- Sector Las Lomas
- Sector Sonador

=== Frontón ===
- Comunidad Ana Rosario
- Comunidad El Perico
- Comunidad Juan Pino
- Comunidad Los Burgos
- Comunidad Los González
- Comunidad Quique Pagan
- Comunidad San Virón
- Parcelas Seguí Nueva
- Parcelas Seguí Vieja
- Comunidad Sumidero
- Sector Atrecho
- Sector Garau
- Sector La Aldea
- Sector Limón
- Sector Raynes
- Sector Sabana
- Sector Yunes

=== Hato Viejo ===
- Sector Caliche
- Sector Campamento
- Sector Cuchillas
- Sector Cumbre
- Sector El Cuco
- Sector La Grama
- Sector Las Lajas
- Sector Las Lomas
- Sector Los Arnao
- Sector Los Barberos
- Sector Los Rosa
- Sector Los Otero
- Urbanización Alturas de Ciales
- Urbanización Monterrey

=== Jaguas ===
- Brisas de Ciales
- Comunidad Los Santiago
- Extensión San José
- Quintas de Ciales
- Reparto Alvelo
- Reparto Cabiya
- Reparto Del Carmen
- Reparto San Miguel
- Sector Club de Leones
- Sector Cojo Vales
- Sector La Línea
- Sector La Loma
- Sector La Pitahaya
- Sector La Roca
- Sector Las Casitas
- Sector Los Mucho
- Sector Los Robles
- Sector Naranjo Dulce
- Sector Santa Clara
- Sector Vaga
- Sector Ventana

=== Pesas ===
- Parcelas María
- Sector Capilla
- Sector Cerro Gordo
- Sector La Cuarta
- Sector Las Cañas
- Sector Los Arocho
- Sector Los Cruz
- Sector Peñonales
- Sector Puente
- Sector Tortuguero
- Urbanización Los Llanos

=== Pozas ===
- Sector Cascana
- Sector Capilla
- Sector Cuesta Mata
- Sector El Cedro
- Sector El Gundo
- Sector El Hoyo
- Sector Frontera
- Sector Las Lomas
- Sector Llanadas
- Sector Manicaboa
- Sector Villanueva

=== Toro Negro ===
- Casa Blanca
- Dos Bocas
- La Piedra
- Vega Redonda

== See also ==
- List of communities in Puerto Rico
