= Frontón, Ciales, Puerto Rico =

Barrio of Puerto Rico

Frontón
- Barrio
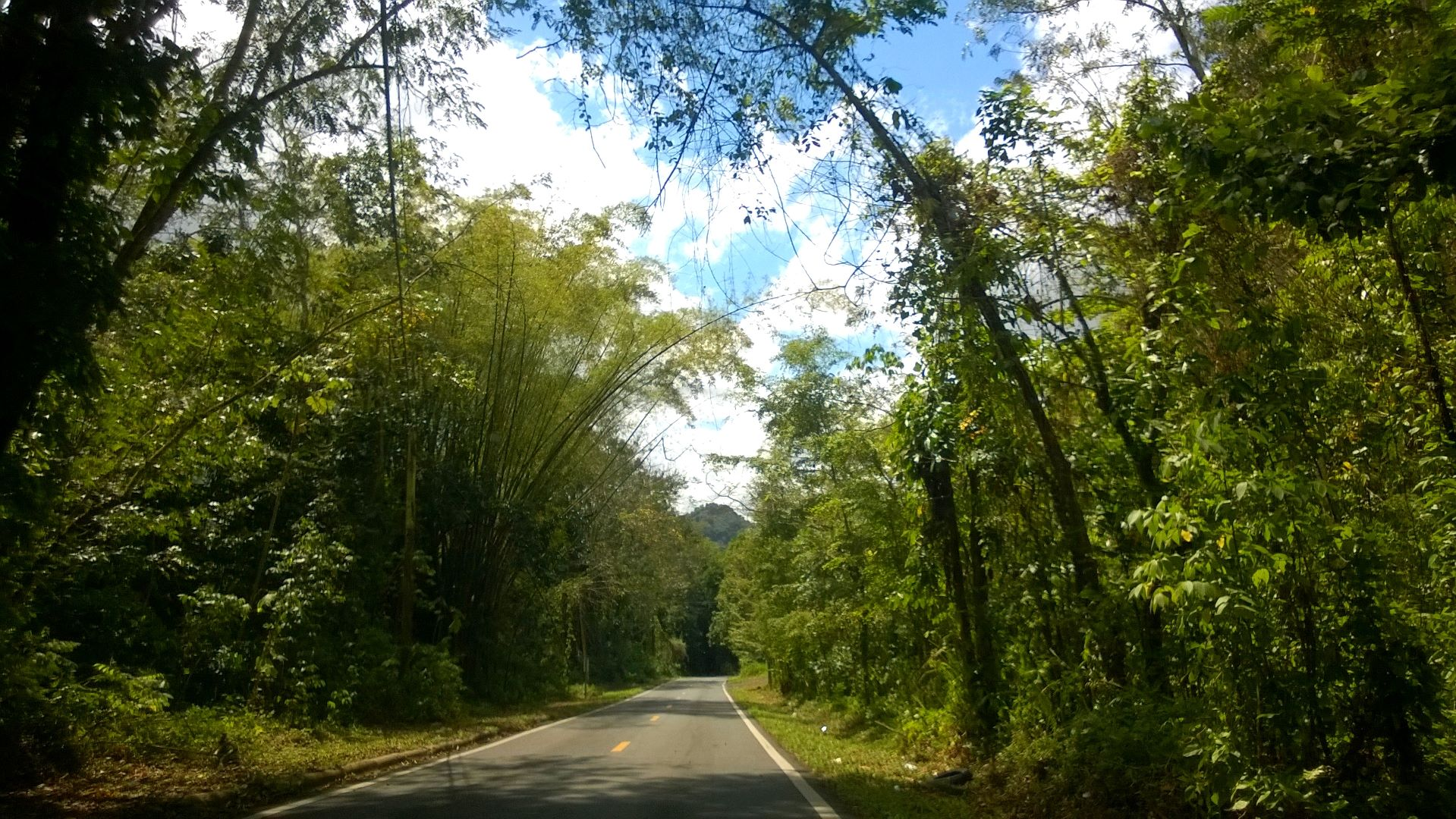
- Puerto Rico Highway 146 in Frontón barrio

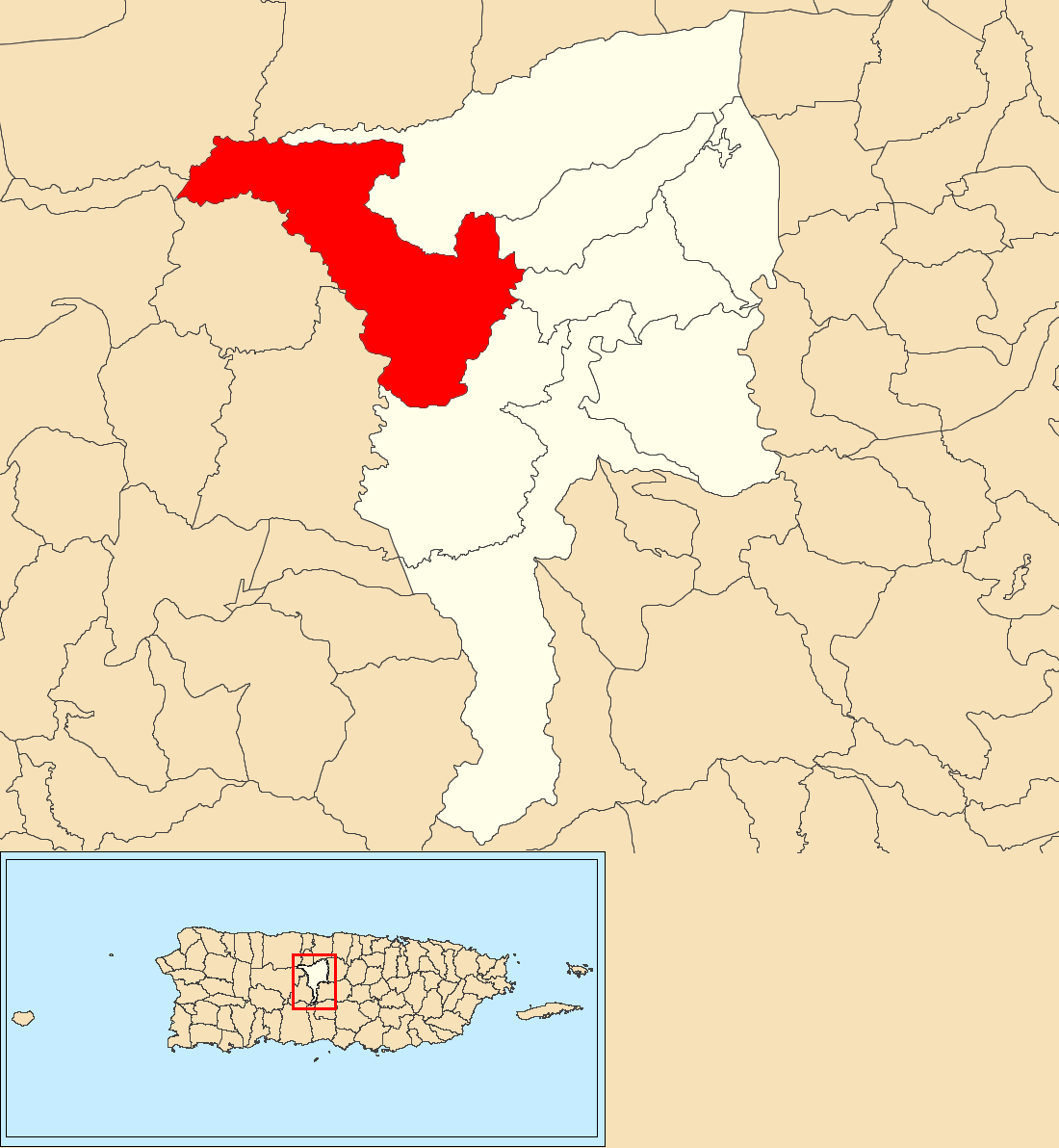
- Location of Frontón within the municipality of Ciales shown in red

- Location of Puerto Rico
- Coordinates: 18°18′30″N 66°33′31″W
- Commonwealth: Puerto Rico
- Municipality: Ciales

Area
  - Total: 11.42 sq mi (29.6 km^{2})
  - Land: 11.42 sq mi (29.6 km^{2})
  - Water: 0 sq mi (0 km^{2})
- Elevation: 1,129 ft (344 m)

Population (2010)
  - Total: 2,228
  - Density: 195.1/sq mi (75.3/km^{2})
- Source: 2010 Census
- Time zone: UTC−4 (AST)
- ZIP Code: 00638
- Area code: 787/939

Frontón is a barrio in the municipality of Ciales, Puerto Rico. Its population in 2010 was 2,228.

== Economy ==
Walmart in Puerto Rico works with USDA-approved businesses located in Frontón, such as Lettufresh, which supply fresh lettuce to Walmart and Amigo Supermarkets.

== History ==
Frontón was in Spain's gazetteers until Puerto Rico was ceded by Spain in the aftermath of the Spanish–American War under the terms of the Treaty of Paris of 1898 and became an unincorporated territory of the United States. In 1899, the United States Department of War conducted a census of Puerto Rico finding that the population of Frontón barrio was 3,706.

Frontón saw a 38.9% increase in population from 1990 to 2000 then a 17.0% decrease from 2000 to 2010.

Historical population
| Census | Pop. | Note | %± |
|---|---|---|---|
| 1900 | 3,706 | | — |
| 1910 | 3,367 | | −9.1% |
| 1920 | 4,095 | | 21.6% |
| 1930 | 3,355 | | −18.1% |
| 1940 | 3,977 | | 18.5% |
| 1950 | 2,518 | | −36.7% |
| 1960 | 2,634 | | 4.6% |
| 1970 | 1,902 | | −27.8% |
| 1980 | 1,883 | | −1.0% |
| 1990 | 1,933 | | 2.7% |
| 2000 | 2,684 | | 38.9% |
| 2010 | 2,228 | | −17.0% |
U.S. Decennial Census; 1899 (shown as 1900) 1910-1930; 1930-1950 1980-2000 2010

== Sectors ==
Barrios (which are, in contemporary times, roughly comparable to minor civil divisions) in turn are further subdivided into smaller local populated place areas/units called sectores (sectors in English). The types of sectores may vary, from normally sector to urbanización to reparto to barriada to residencial, among others.

The following sectors are in Frontón barrio:

Comunidad Ana Rosario, Comunidad El Perico, Comunidad Juan Pino, Comunidad Los Burgos, Comunidad Los González, Comunidad Quique Pagan, Comunidad San Virón, Parcelas Seguí Nueva, Parcelas Seguí Vieja, Comunidad Sumidero, Sector Atrecho, Sector Garau, Sector La Aldea, Sector Limón, Sector Raynes, Sector Sabana, and Sector Yunes.

== Gallery ==
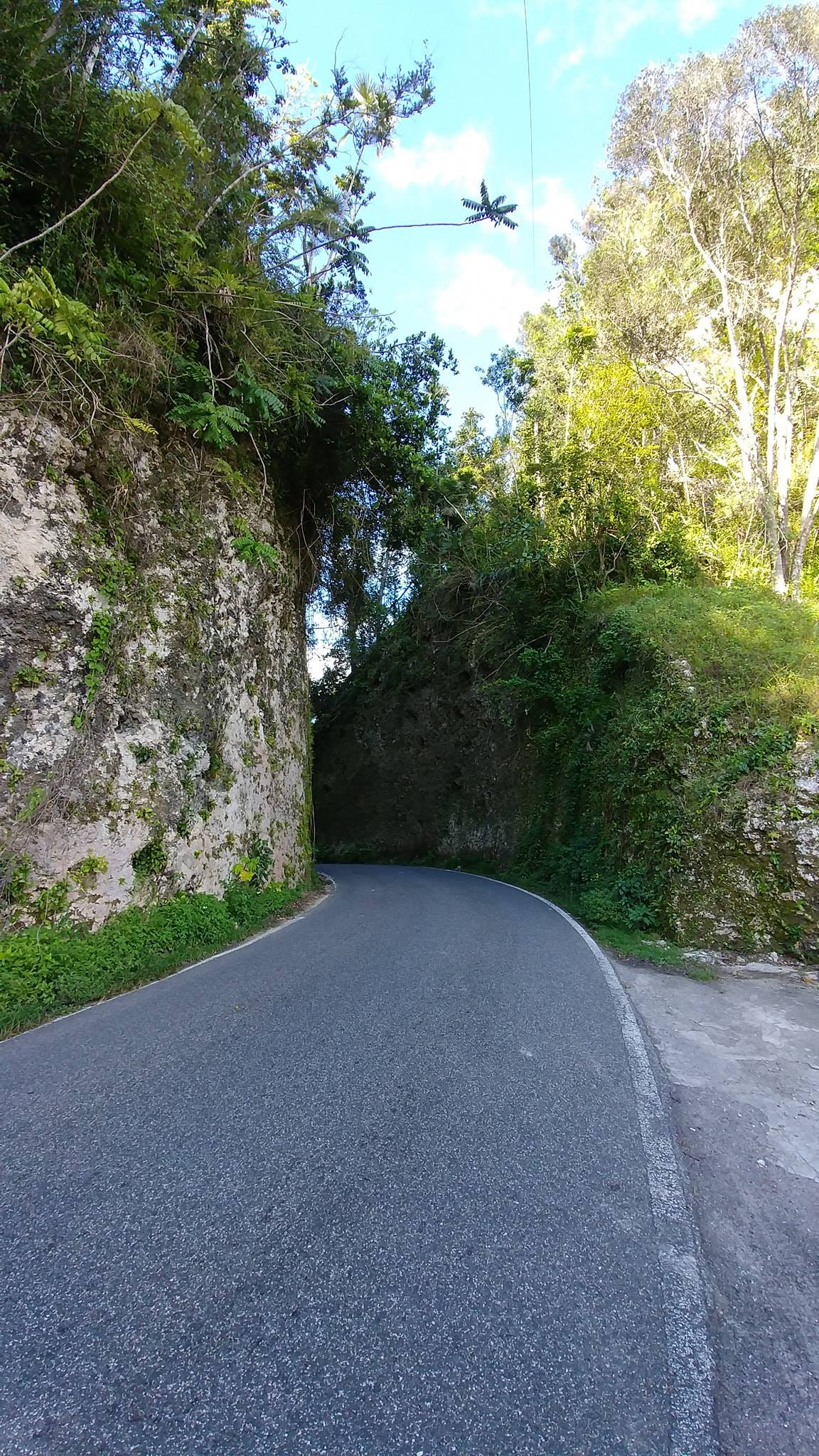
Puerto Rico Highway 140 in Frontón

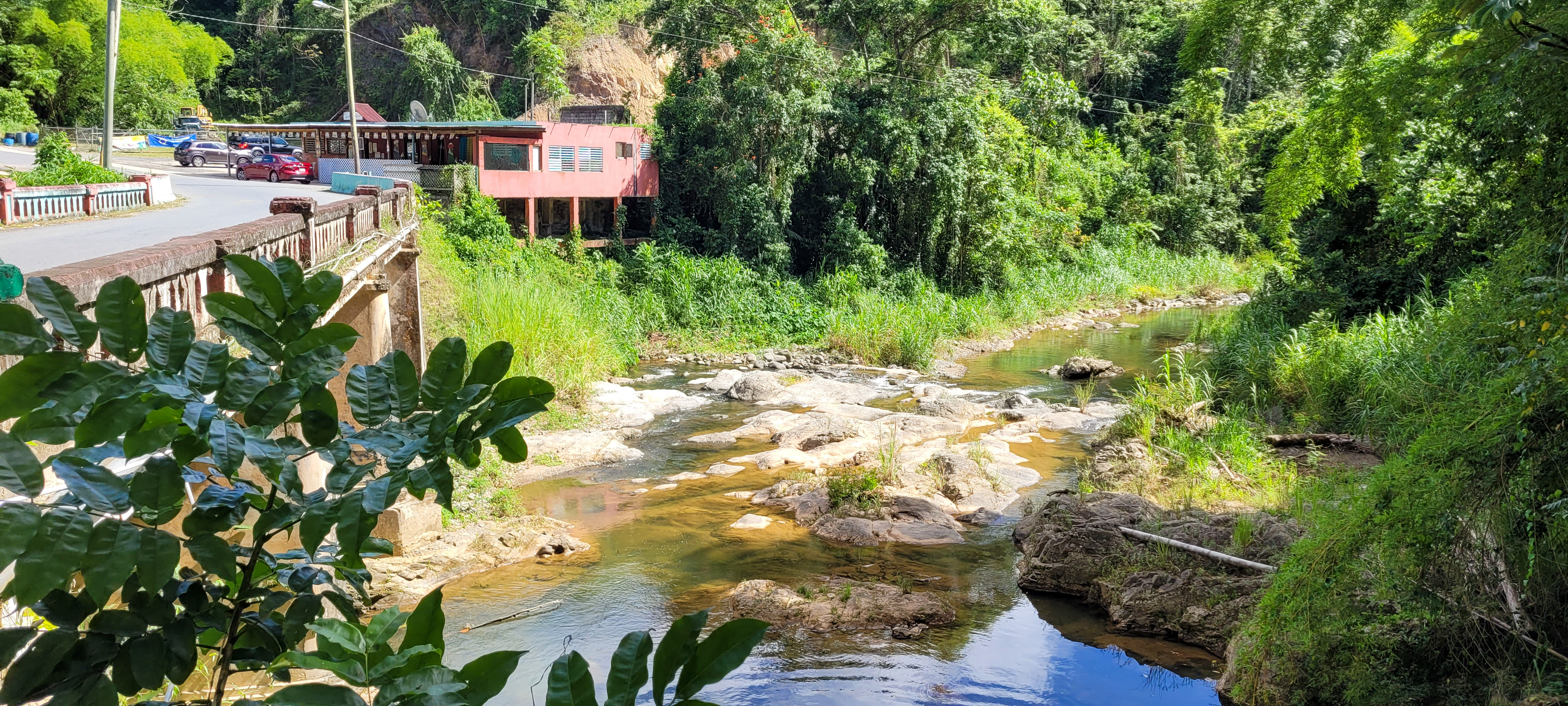
Yunes River between Frontón (Ciales) and Mameyes Abajo (Utuado) barrios

== See also ==
- List of communities in Puerto Rico
- List of barrios and sectors of Ciales, Puerto Rico
