= Manatí Bridge at Mata de Plátano =

Historic bridge in Ciales municipality, Puerto Rico

- U.S. National Register of Historic Places
- Puerto Rico Historic Sites and Zones
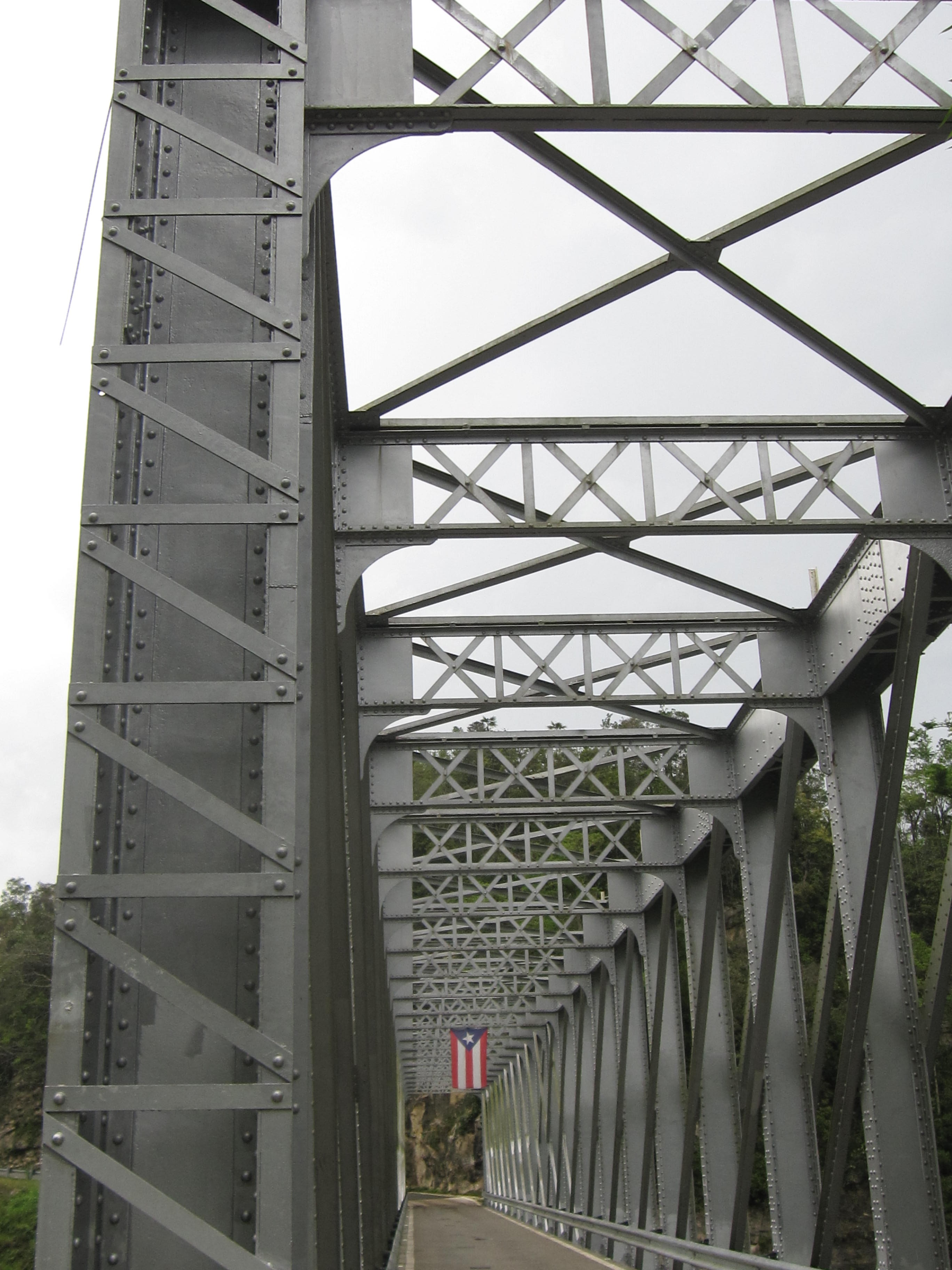

- Location within Puerto Rico
- Location: Highway 6685, km 9.7; Hato Viejo, Ciales municipality, Puerto Rico
- Coordinates: 18°21′32″N 66°28′45″W
- Built: 1905
- Architect: Luis Ninlliat
- Architectural style: double intersection Pratt
- MPS: Historic Bridges of Puerto Rico MPS
- NRHP reference No.: 95000847
- RNSZH No.: 22000-(RC)-22-JP-SH

Significant dates
- Added to NRHP: July 19, 1995
- Delisted RNSZH: March 15, 2001

Manatí Bridge at Mata de Plátano, also known as Puente Juan José Jiménez and listed as Bridge #321 in Puerto Rico's bridge inventory, was built in 1905 in Hato Viejo, Ciales, Puerto Rico. It was listed on the National Register of Historic Places in 1995 and on the Puerto Rico Register of Historic Sites and Zones in 2001.

It was the first truss bridge built in Puerto Rico under the administration of the United States (1898–1900) after the Spanish–American War.

The bridge spans 80 metres (260 ft) above the Río Grande de Manatí. For Puerto Rico, the span is high, 44 feet (13 m) above the river, "above a spectacular curving canyon of vertical walls traversed by the Manati River". It is a rare type of bridge: a steel double intersection Pratt truss, above a concrete substructure, and is the only such highway bridge in Puerto Rico. Its a 3.8 metres (12 ft) wide, one-lane road. The bridge is visited by tourists.

At least 10 railway bridges used the double intersection Pratt truss design, in the French-owned railway that was built during 1890-93 between San Juan and Ponce. Only Cambalache Bridge, across the Arecibo River, survived, as of 1994. The rest were dismantled and sold to cover a bankruptcy by the railroad company that owned them.

It was remodeled in 2010.

Residents complain when the bridge is closed because it is the only direct access from Manatí to Ciales when the bridge from Morovis to Ciales is inaccessible.

In 2018, $6.8 million dollars were earmarked by the US Federal Highway Administration for repairs to the bridge.

== Gallery ==
Views of the canyon and Río Grande de Manatí from Manatí Bridge at Mata de Plátano:

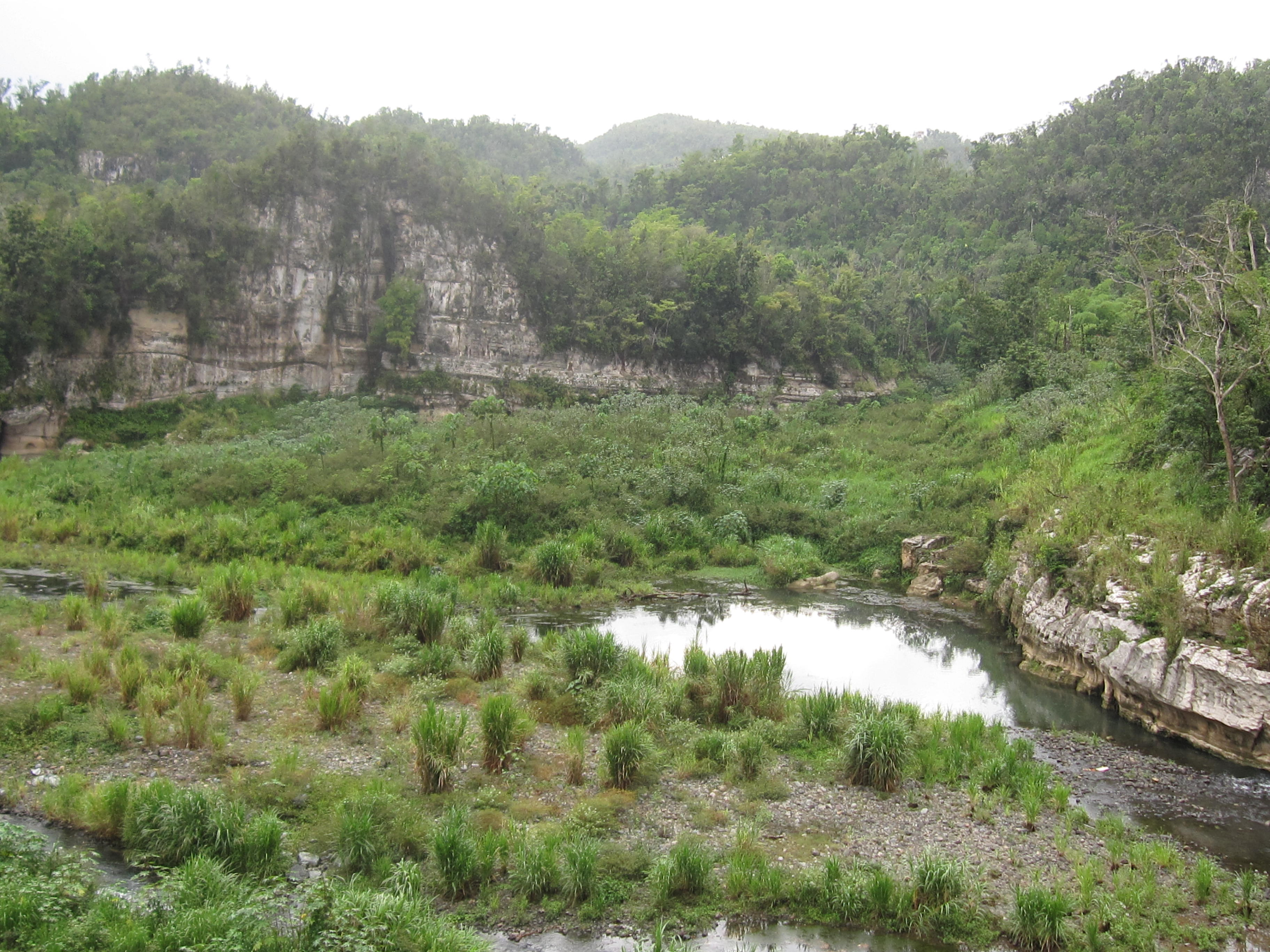

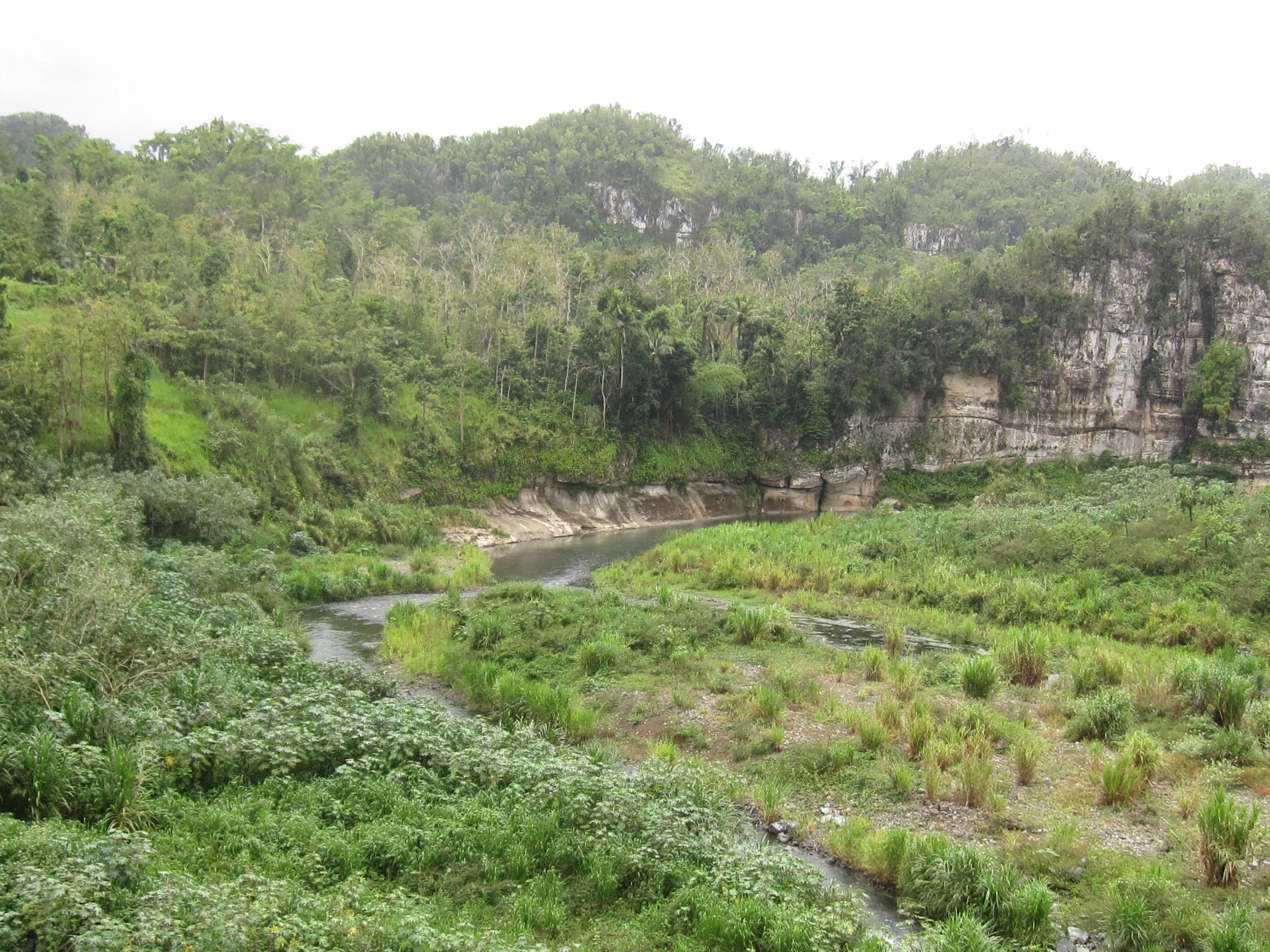

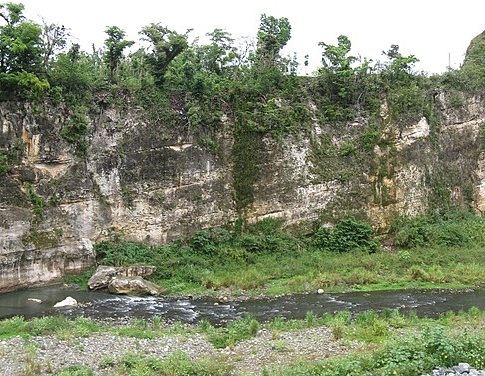

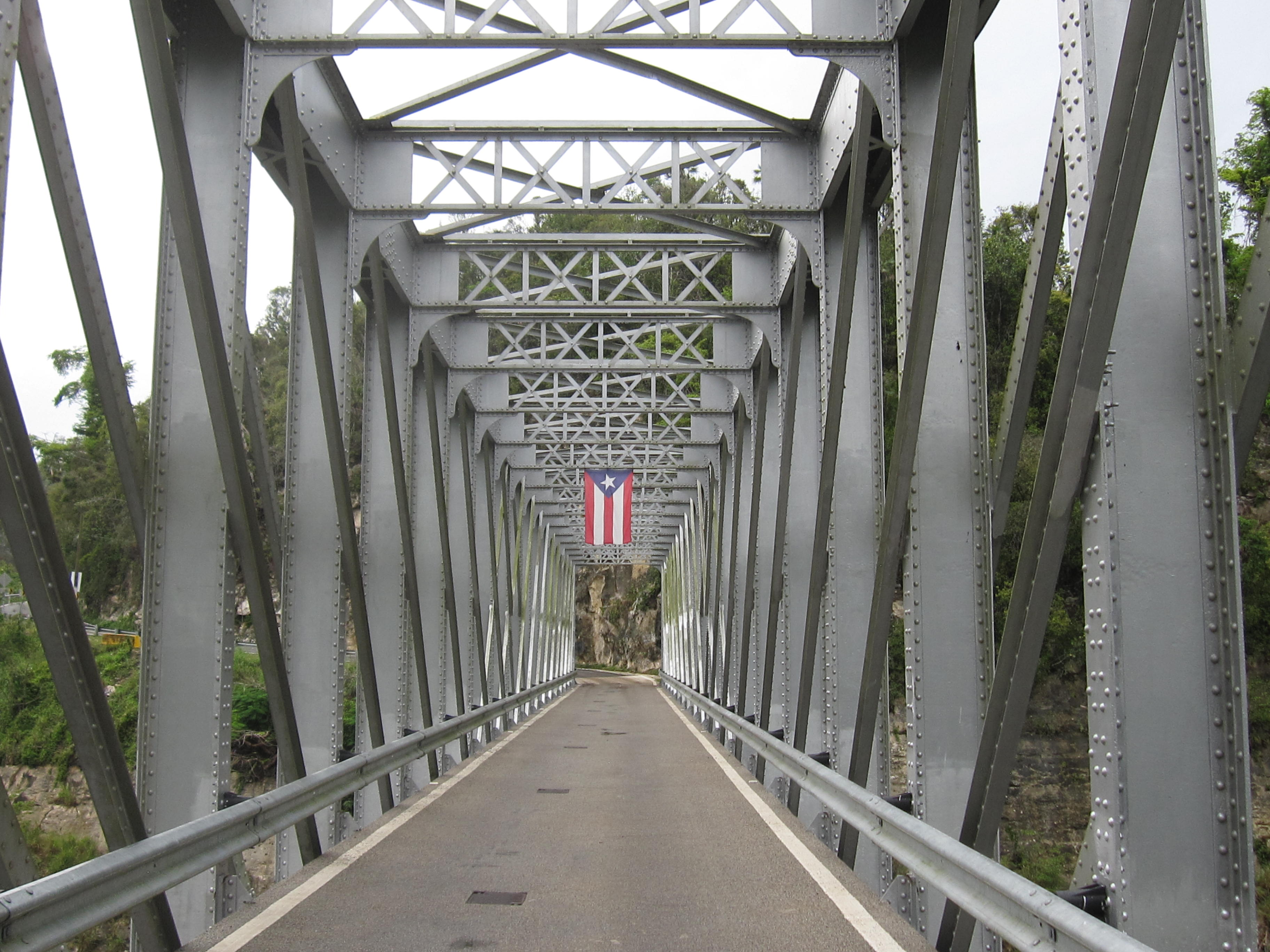
