= Puerto Rico Highway 633 =

Highway in Puerto Rico

Highway 633
- Ruta 633

Route information
- Maintained by Puerto Rico DTPW
- Length: 4.3 km (2.7 mi)
- Existed: 1953–present

Major junctions
- West end: PR-149 in Hato Viejo
- East end: PR-155 in Barahona

Location
- Country: United States
- Territory: Puerto Rico
- Municipalities: Ciales, Morovis

Highway system
- Roads in Puerto Rico; List
← PR-591	→ PR-647
← PR-6165	PR-6633	→ PR-6685

Puerto Rico Highway 633 (PR-633) is an east–west rural road located between the municipalities of Ciales and Morovis in Puerto Rico. With a length of 4.3 km (2.7 mi), it begins at its intersection with PR-149 in Hato Viejo barrio and ends at its junction with PR-155 in Barahona.

== Route description ==
Due to its rural characteristics, PR-633 consists of one lane per direction for its entire length. In Ciales, it extends from PR-149 intersection to the Morovis municipal limit, making its way through Hato Viejo barrio. In Morovis, PR-633 extends to the east within Barahona barrio from the Ciales municipal limit until its eastern terminus at PR-155 junction. In both municipalities, this highway serves as the main access to several neighborhoods and sectors between PR-149 and PR-155.

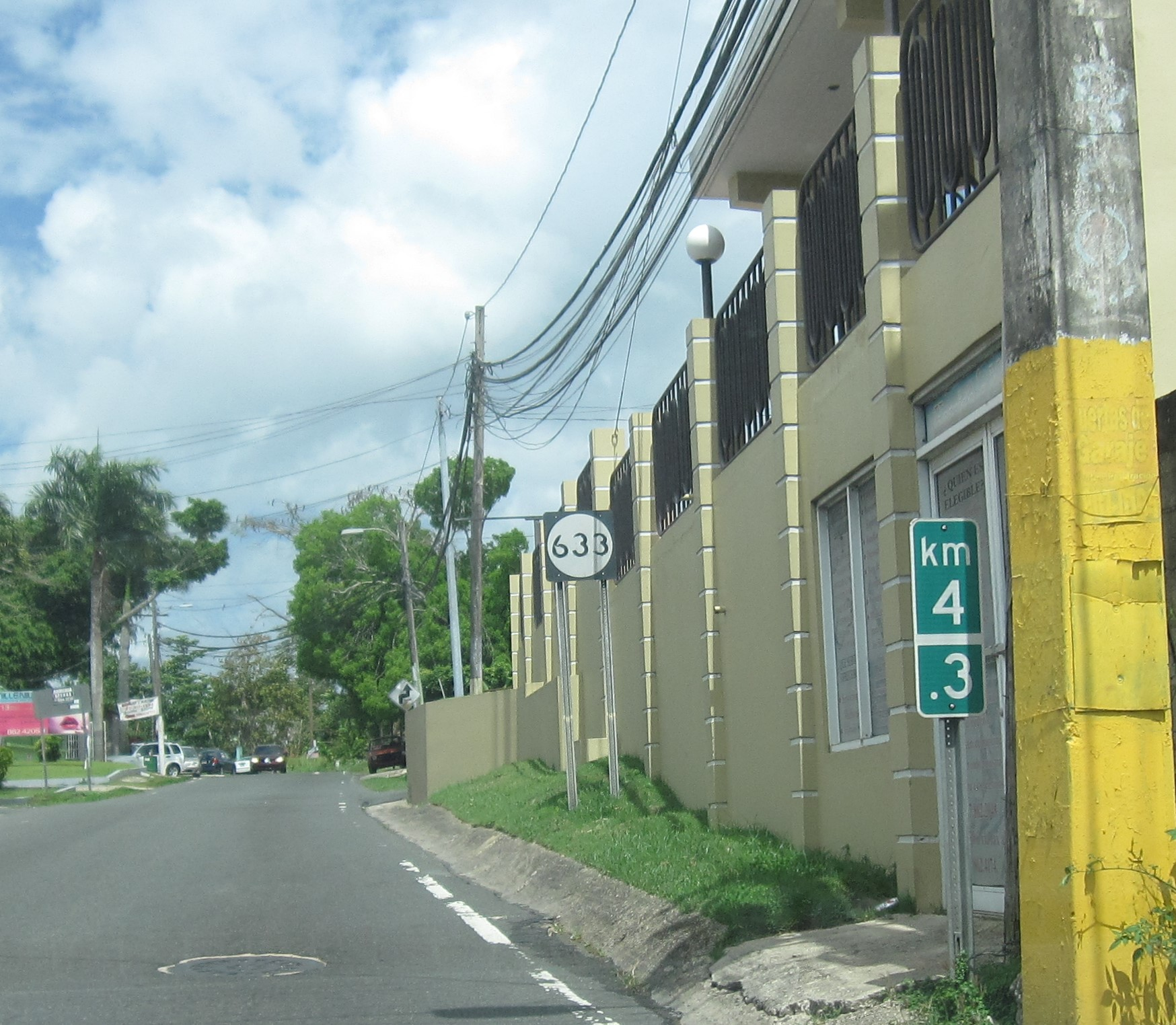
PR-633 west in Barahona, Morovis

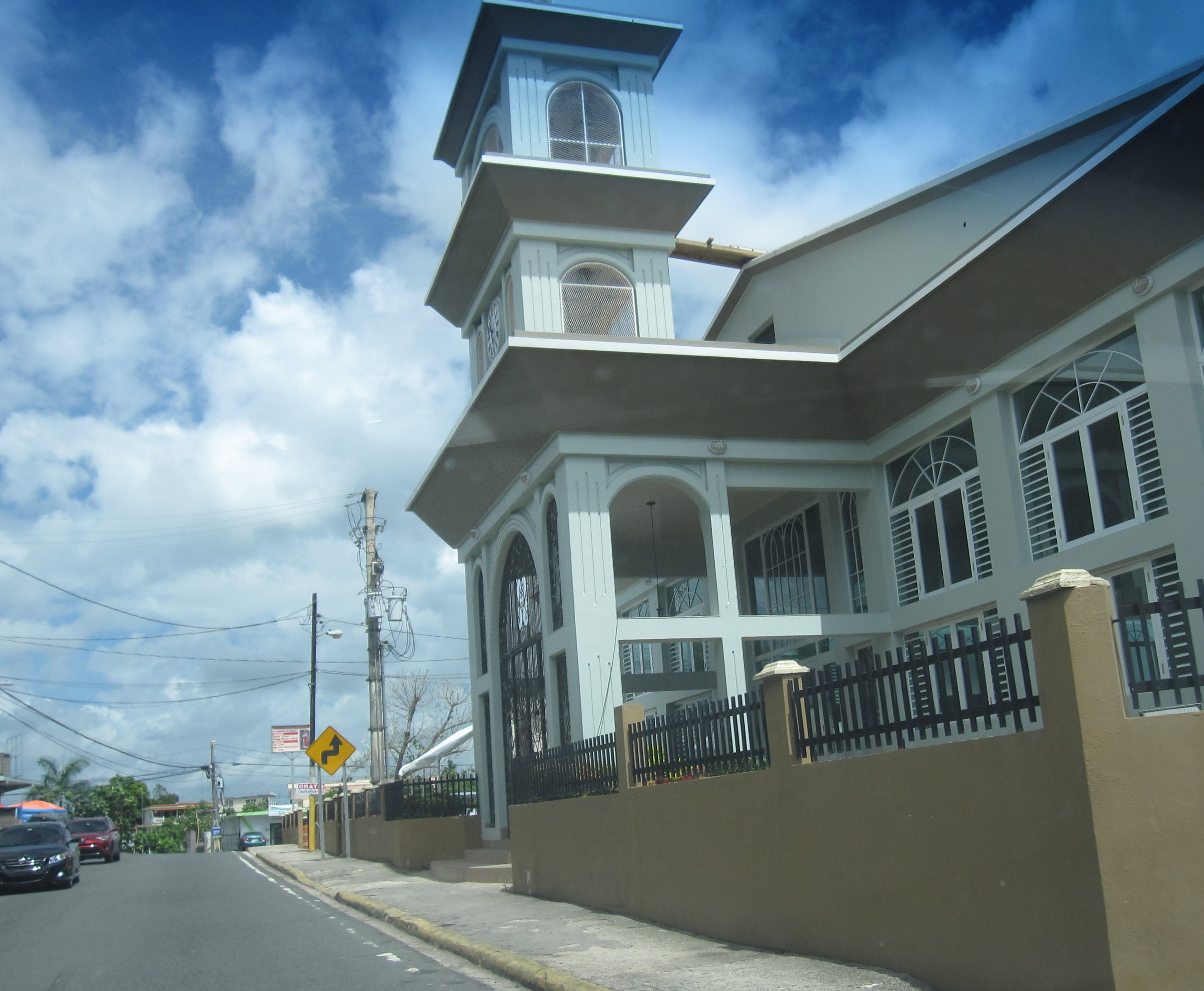
Building on PR-633 in Barahona, Morovis

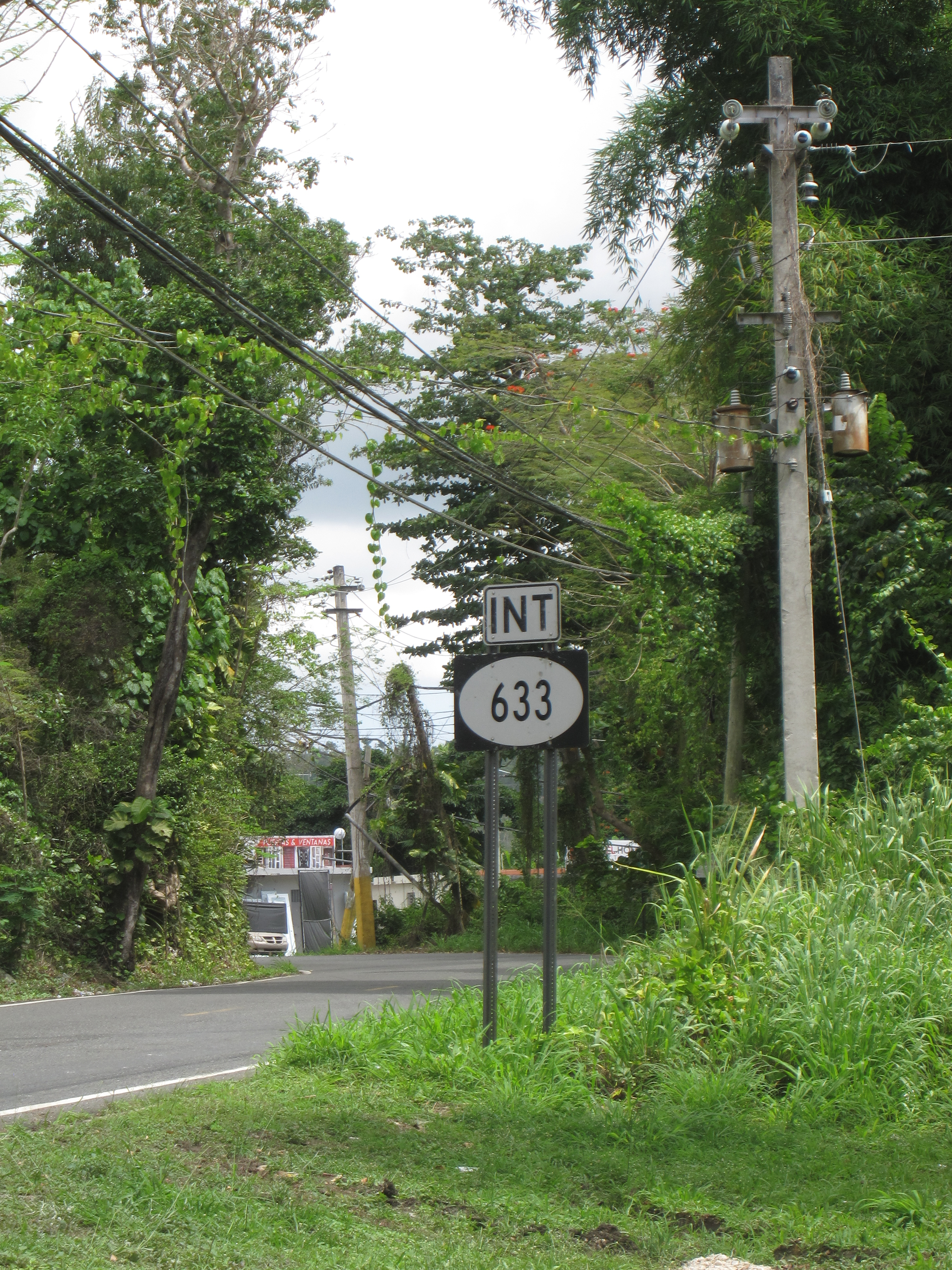
PR-155 north near PR-633 intersection in Barahona, Morovis

== History ==
The entire length of PR-633 is part of the western section of the old Road No. 20, a highway that led from Naranjito to Ciales through Corozal and Morovis until the 1953 Puerto Rico highway renumbering, a process implemented by the Puerto Rico Department of Transportation and Public Works (Spanish: Departamento de Transportación y Obras Públicas) that increased the insular highway network to connect existing routes with different locations around Puerto Rico. Route 20 was divided into two segments: the first one, from Naranjito to Corozal, and the second one, from Corozal to Ciales. The first section corresponds to the current PR-164 from PR-167 (old Road No. 9) to PR-159 (former Road No. 10), while the second one went to Morovis through PR-159, beginning at its junction with PR-568 (old Road No. 10) in western Corozal to continue to Ciales through PR-155, PR-633 and PR-6633 until its end at PR-6685 (former Road No. 11).

== Major intersections ==
Municipality	Location	km	mi	Destinations	Notes
Ciales	Hato Viejo	0.0	0.0	PR-149 (Carretera Fernando "Nando" Otero Sánchez) – Ciales, Manatí	Western terminus of PR-633
Morovis	Barahona	4.3	2.7	PR-155 – Morovis, Vega Baja	Eastern terminus of PR-633
1.000 mi = 1.609 km; 1.000 km = 0.621 mi

== Related route ==
Highway 6633
- Location: Ciales
- Length: 0.22 km (0.14 mi; 720 ft)

Puerto Rico Highway 6633 (PR-6633) is a spur route located in Ciales. With a length of 0.22 km (0.14 mi), it extends from PR-6685 to PR-149, near to the western terminus of PR-633. The entire route is located in Hato Viejo, Ciales.

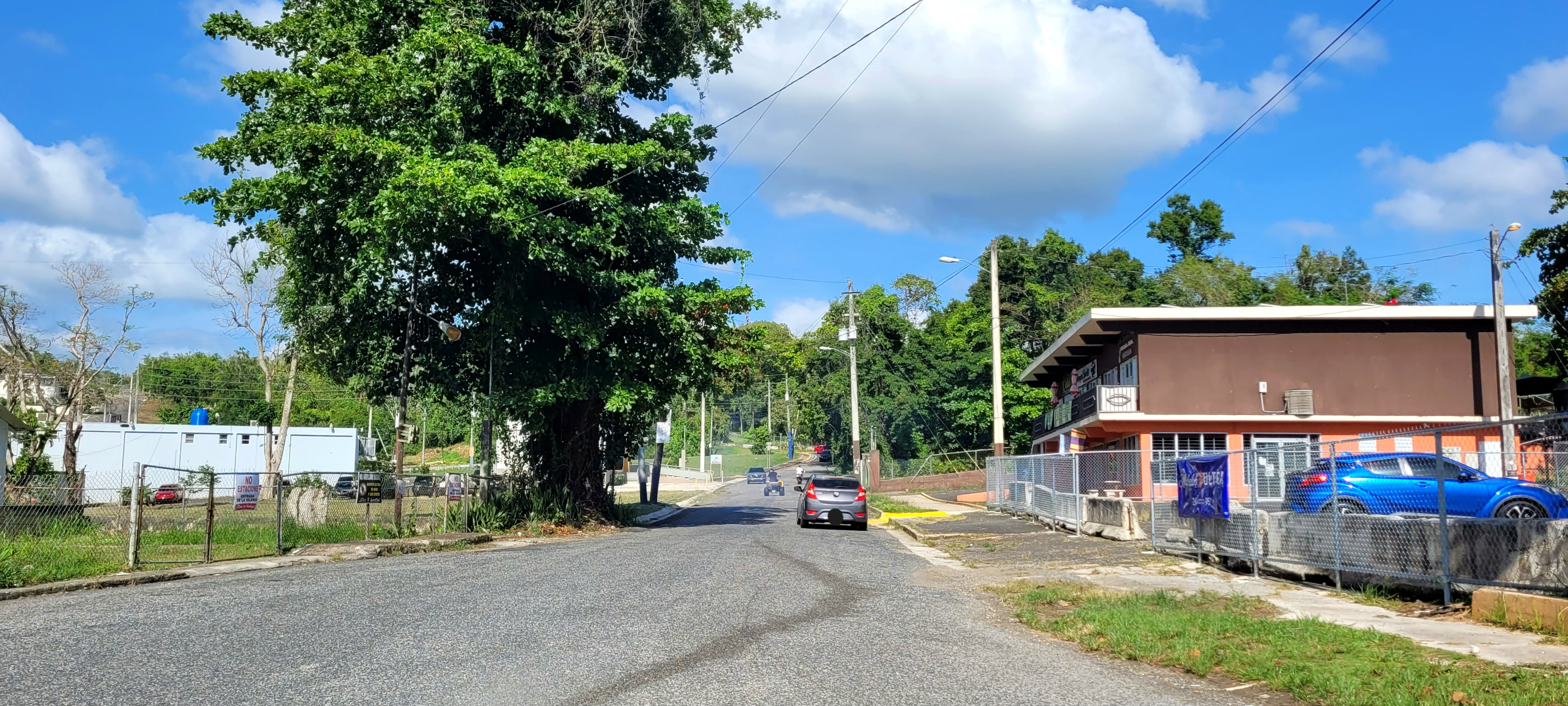
Western terminus of PR-6633 at PR-6685 junction in Hato Viejo, Ciales, looking east

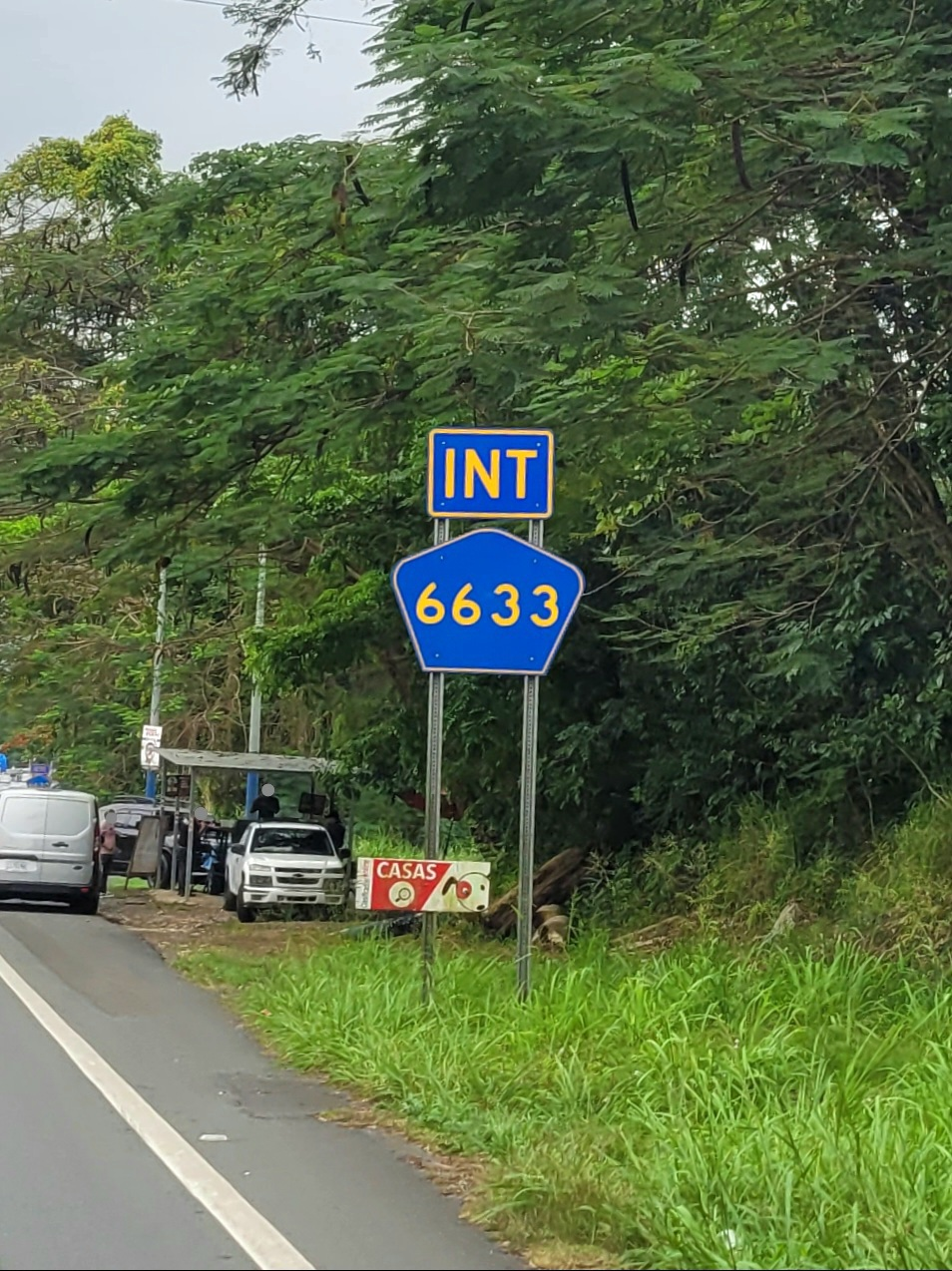
PR-149 north near PR-6633 intersection

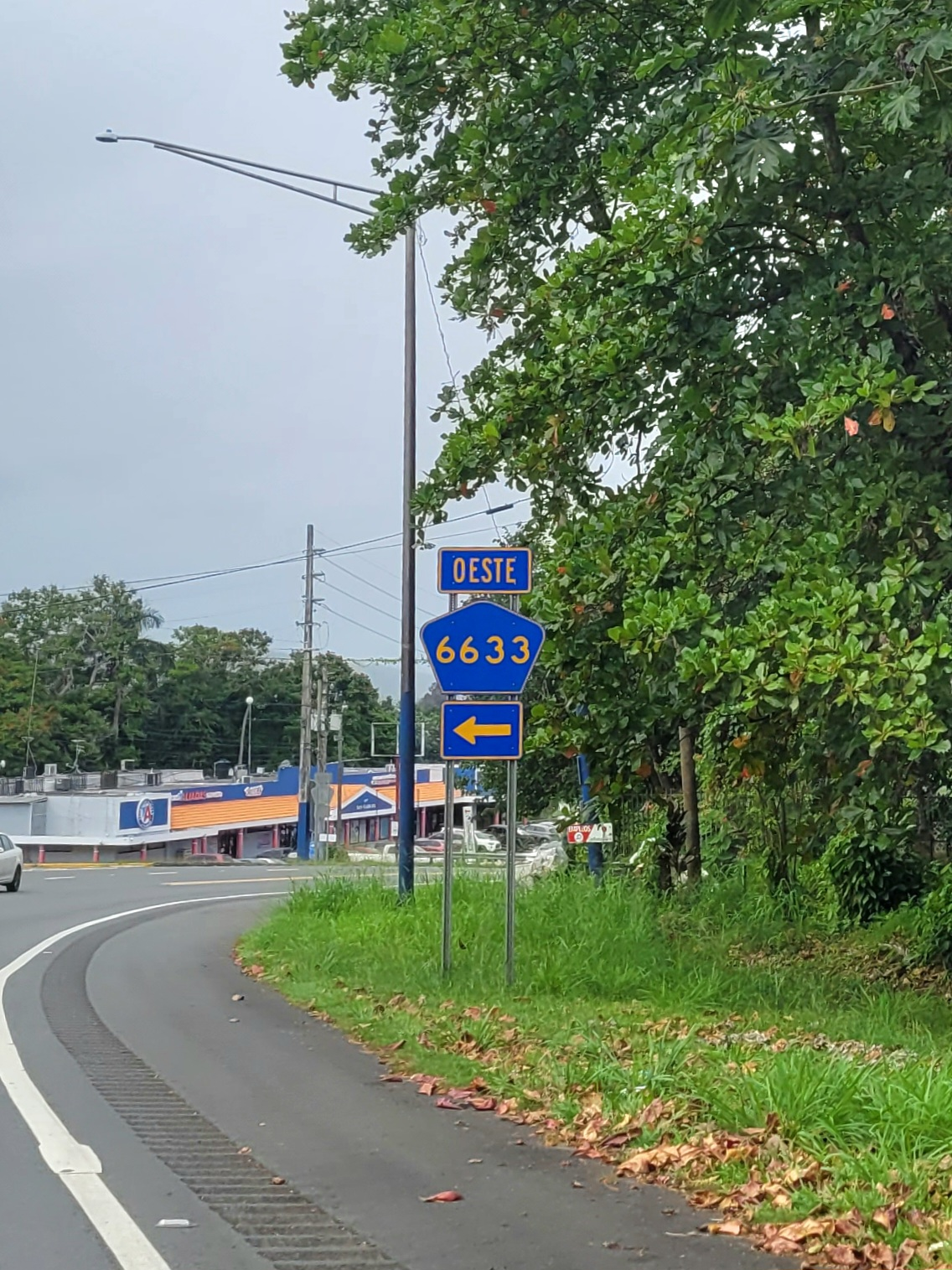
PR-149 north at PR-6633 intersection

km	mi	Destinations	Notes
0.00	0.00	PR-6685 – Ciales, Manatí	Western terminus of PR-6633
0.22	0.14	PR-149 (Carretera Fernando "Nando" Otero Sánchez) – Ciales, Manatí	Eastern terminus of PR-6633
1.000 mi = 1.609 km; 1.000 km = 0.621 mi
