= Jaguas, Ciales, Puerto Rico =

Barrio of Puerto Rico

Jaguas
- Barrio
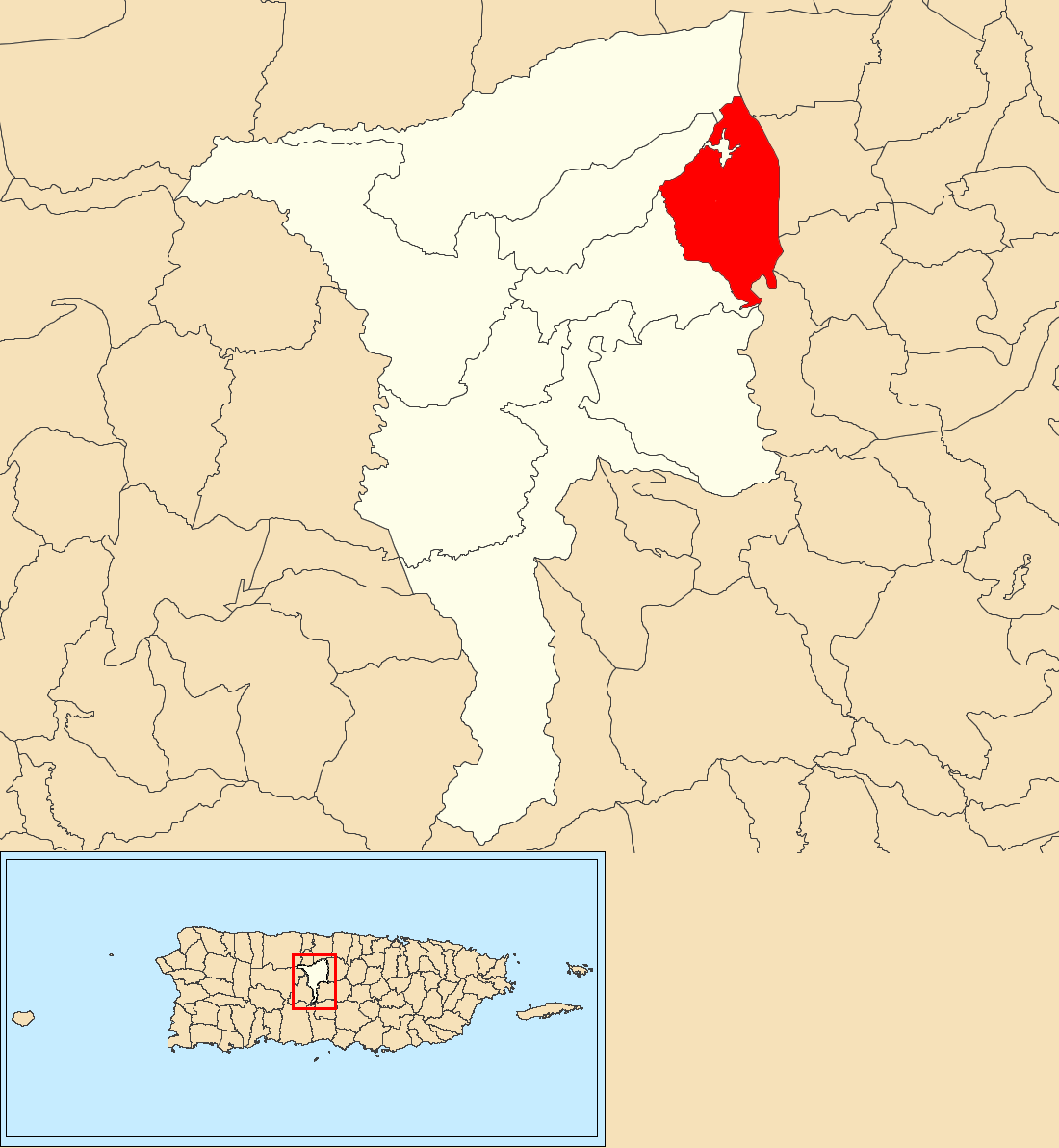
- Location of Jaguas within the municipality of Ciales shown in red

- Location of Puerto Rico
- Coordinates: 18°19′05″N 66°27′55″W
- Commonwealth: Puerto Rico
- Municipality: Ciales

Area
  - Total: 4.48 sq mi (11.6 km^{2})
  - Land: 4.39 sq mi (11.4 km^{2})
  - Water: 0.09 sq mi (0.23 km^{2})
- Elevation: 512 ft (156 m)

Population (2010)
  - Total: 4,545
  - Density: 1,035.3/sq mi (399.7/km^{2})
- Source: 2010 Census
- Time zone: UTC−4 (AST)
- ZIP Code: 00638
- Area code: 787/939

Jaguas is a barrio in the municipality of Ciales, Puerto Rico. Its population in 2010 was 4,545.

== History ==
Jaguas was in Spain's gazetteers until Puerto Rico was ceded by Spain in the aftermath of the Spanish–American War under the terms of the Treaty of Paris of 1898 and became an unincorporated territory of the United States. In 1899, the United States Department of War conducted a census of Puerto Rico finding that the population of Jaguas barrio (Jagua as it was called then) was 1,264.

Historical population
Census	Pop.	Note	%±
1900	1,264		—
1910	1,434		13.4%
1920	1,445		0.8%
1930	3,098		114.4%
1940	3,305		6.7%
1950	2,154		−34.8%
1960	1,957		−9.1%
1970	0		−100.0%
1980	4,190		—
1990	4,599		9.8%
2000	4,943		7.5%
2010	4,545		−8.1%
U.S. Decennial Census; 1899 (shown as 1900) 1910-1930; 1930-1950 1980-2000 2010

== Sectors ==
Barrios (which are, in contemporary times, roughly comparable to minor civil divisions) in turn are further subdivided into smaller local populated place areas/units called sectores (sectors in English). The types of sectores may vary, from normally sector to urbanización to reparto to barriada to residencial, among others.

The following sectors are in Jaguas barrio:

Brisas de Ciales, Comunidad Los Santiago, Quintas de Ciales, Reparto Alvelo, Reparto Cabiya, Reparto Del Carmen, Reparto San Miguel, Sector Club de Leones, Sector Cojo Vales, Sector La Línea, Sector La Loma, Sector La Pitahaya, Sector La Roca, Sector Las Casitas, Sector Los Mucho, Sector Los Robles, Sector Naranjo Dulce, Sector Santa Clara, Sector Vaga, and Sector Ventana.

== See also ==
- List of communities in Puerto Rico
- List of barrios and sectors of Ciales, Puerto Rico
