= Cordillera, Ciales, Puerto Rico =

Barrio of Puerto Rico

Cordillera
- Barrio
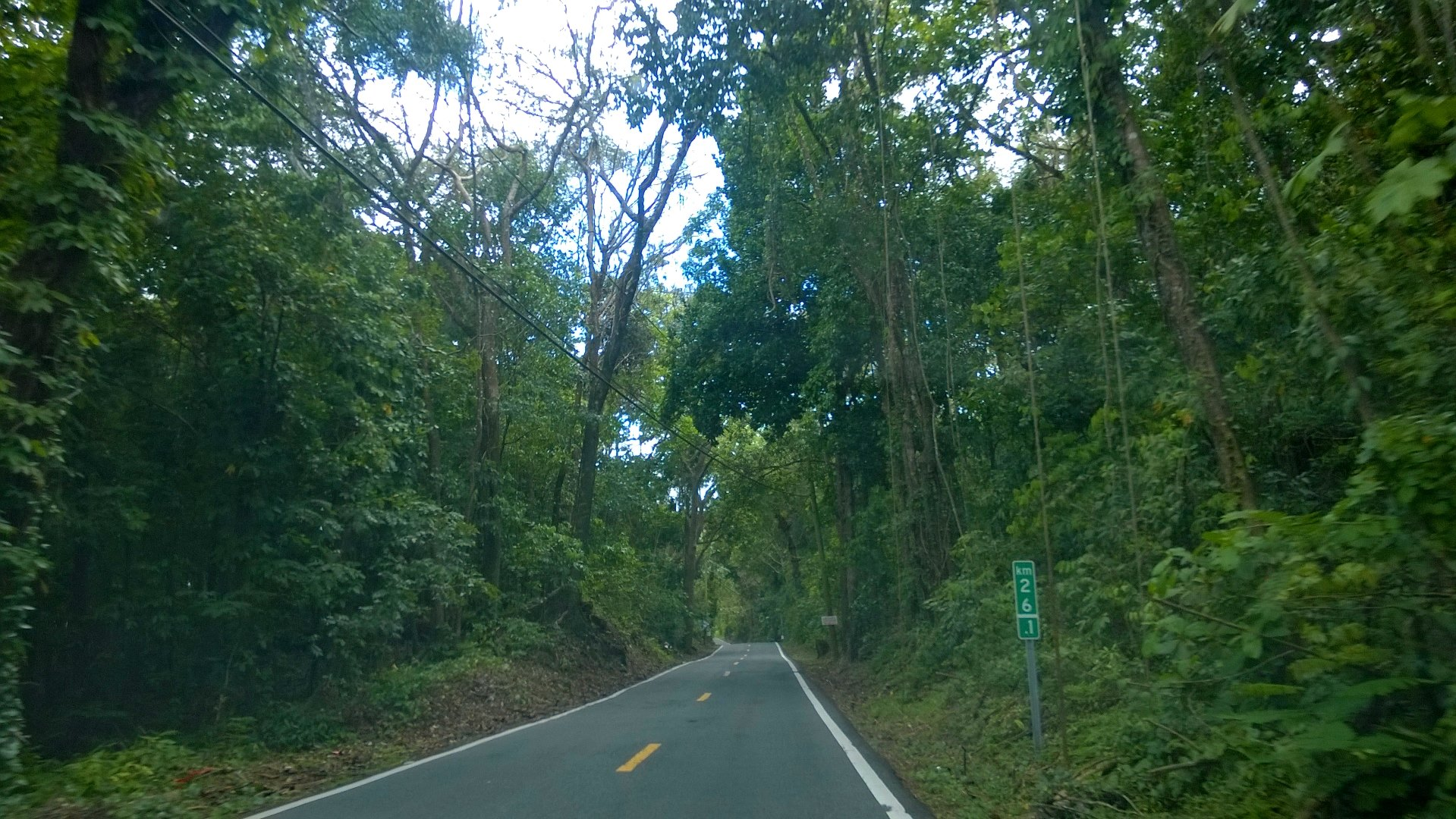
- Puerto Rico Highway 146 in Cordillera

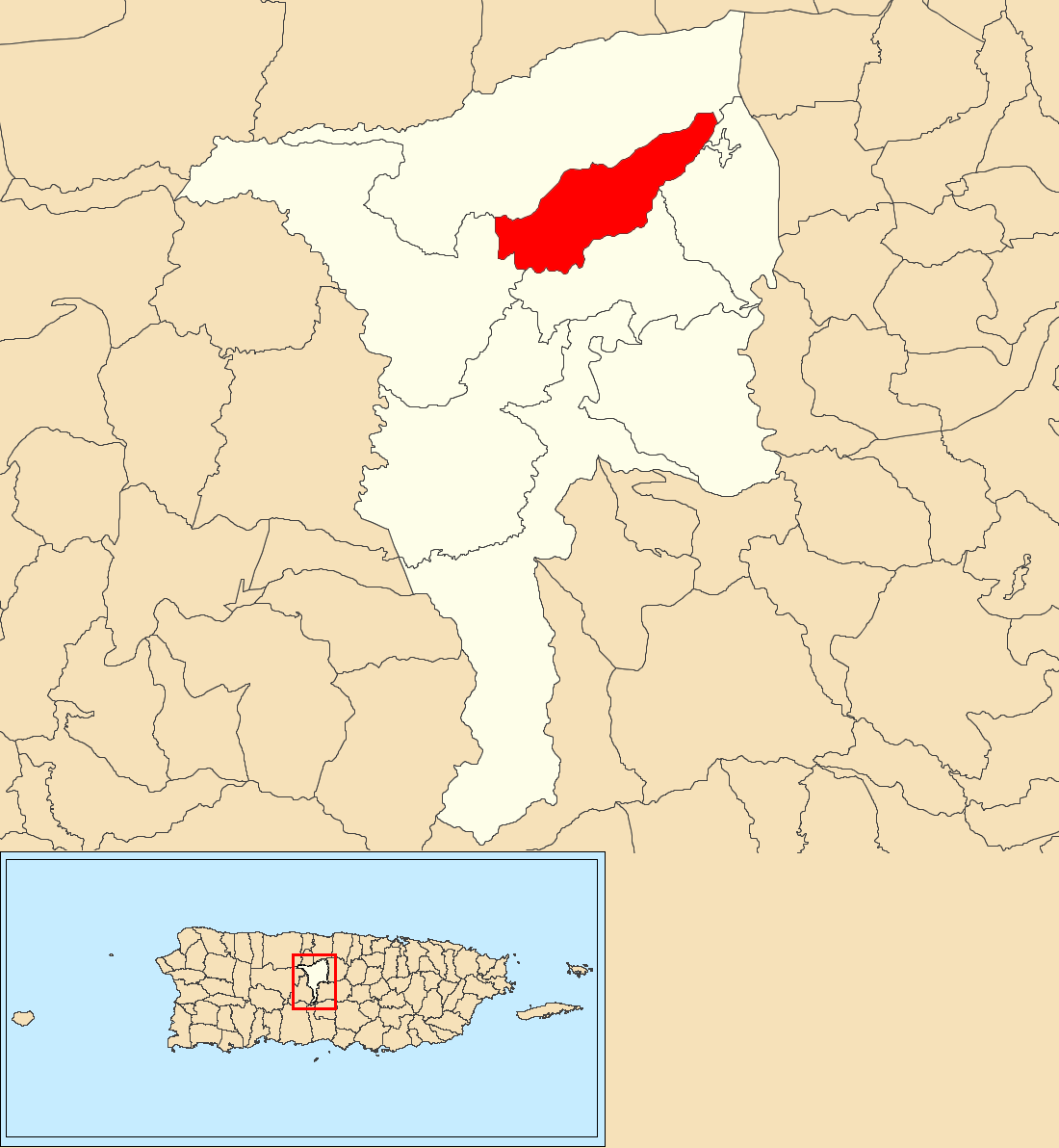
- Location of Cordillera within the municipality of Ciales shown in red

- Location of Puerto Rico
- Coordinates: 18°19′31″N 66°29′52″W
- Commonwealth: Puerto Rico
- Municipality: Ciales

Area
  - Total: 4.16 sq mi (10.8 km^{2})
  - Land: 4.16 sq mi (10.8 km^{2})
  - Water: 0 sq mi (0 km^{2})
- Elevation: 981 ft (299 m)

Population (2010)
  - Total: 2,348
  - Density: 564.4/sq mi (217.9/km^{2})
- Source: 2010 Census
- Time zone: UTC−4 (AST)
- ZIP Code: 00638
- Area code: 787/939

Cordillera is a barrio in the municipality of Ciales, Puerto Rico. Its population in 2010 was 2,348.

== History ==
Cordillera was in Spain's gazetteers until Puerto Rico was ceded by Spain in the aftermath of the Spanish–American War under the terms of the Treaty of Paris of 1898 and became an unincorporated territory of the United States. In 1899, the United States Department of War conducted a census of Puerto Rico finding that the population of Cordillera barrio was 1,425.

Historical population
Census	Pop.	Note	%±
1900	1,425		—
1910	1,961		37.6%
1920	1,932		−1.5%
1930	1,610		−16.7%
1940	2,189		36.0%
1950	1,566		−28.5%
1960	1,560		−0.4%
1970	0		−100.0%
1980	1,900		—
1990	2,326		22.4%
2000	2,193		−5.7%
2010	2,348		7.1%
U.S. Decennial Census; 1899 (shown as 1900) 1910-1930; 1930-1950 1980-2000 2010

== Sectors ==
Barrios (which are, in contemporary times, roughly comparable to minor civil divisions) in turn are further subdivided into smaller local populated place areas/units called sectores (sectors in English). The types of sectores may vary, from normally sector to urbanización to reparto to barriada to residencial, among others.

The following sectors are in Cordillera barrio:

Camino Los Pagán, Carretera 146, Comunidad Ortega, Comunidad Villalobos, Parcelas Alturas de Cordillera (Parcelas Nuevas), Parcelas Cordillera, Sector El Cinco, Sector El Seis, Sector El Siete, Sector El Tres, and Sector Sonador.

== Gallery ==
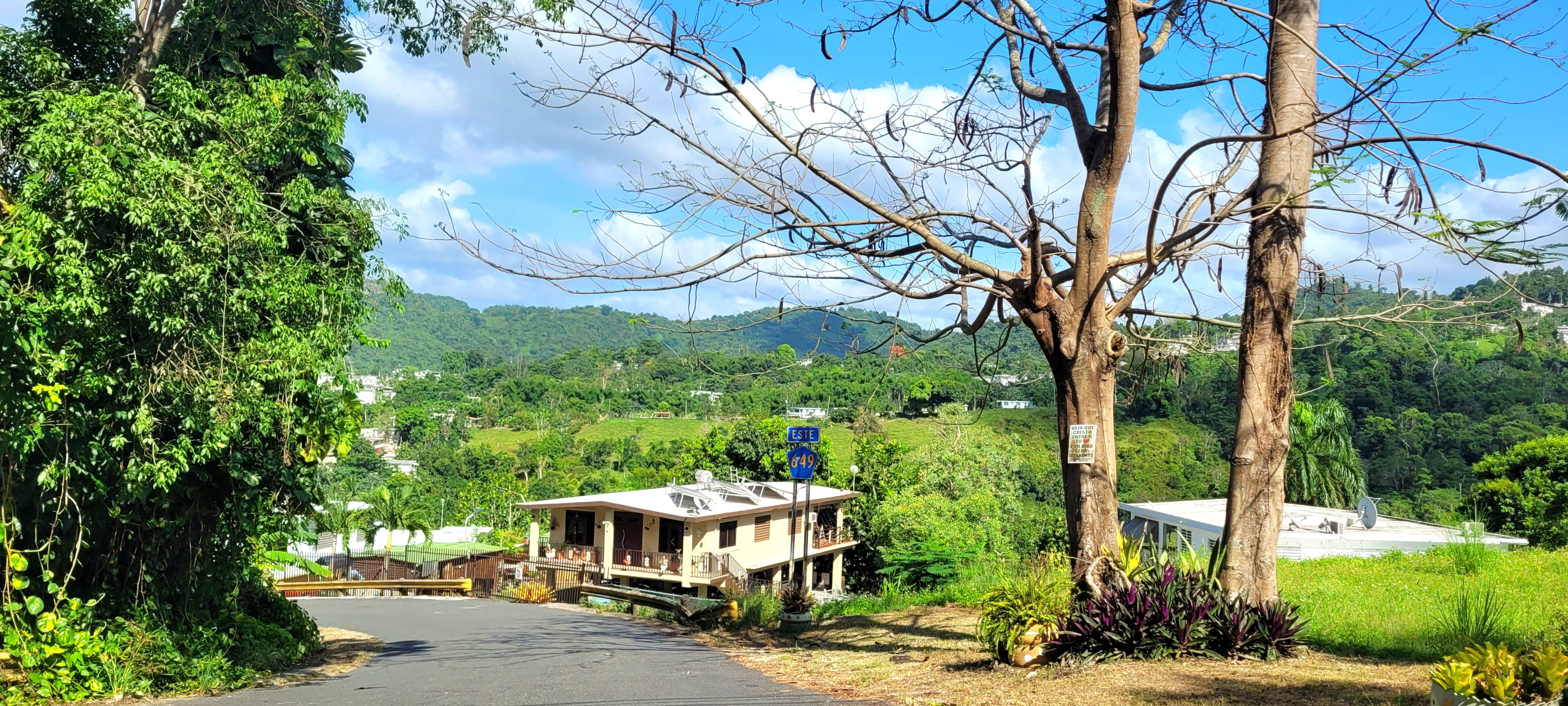
Puerto Rico Highway 649 in Cordillera

== See also ==
- List of communities in Puerto Rico
- List of barrios and sectors of Ciales, Puerto Rico
