= Hato Viejo, Ciales, Puerto Rico =

Barrio of Puerto Rico

Hato Viejo
- Barrio
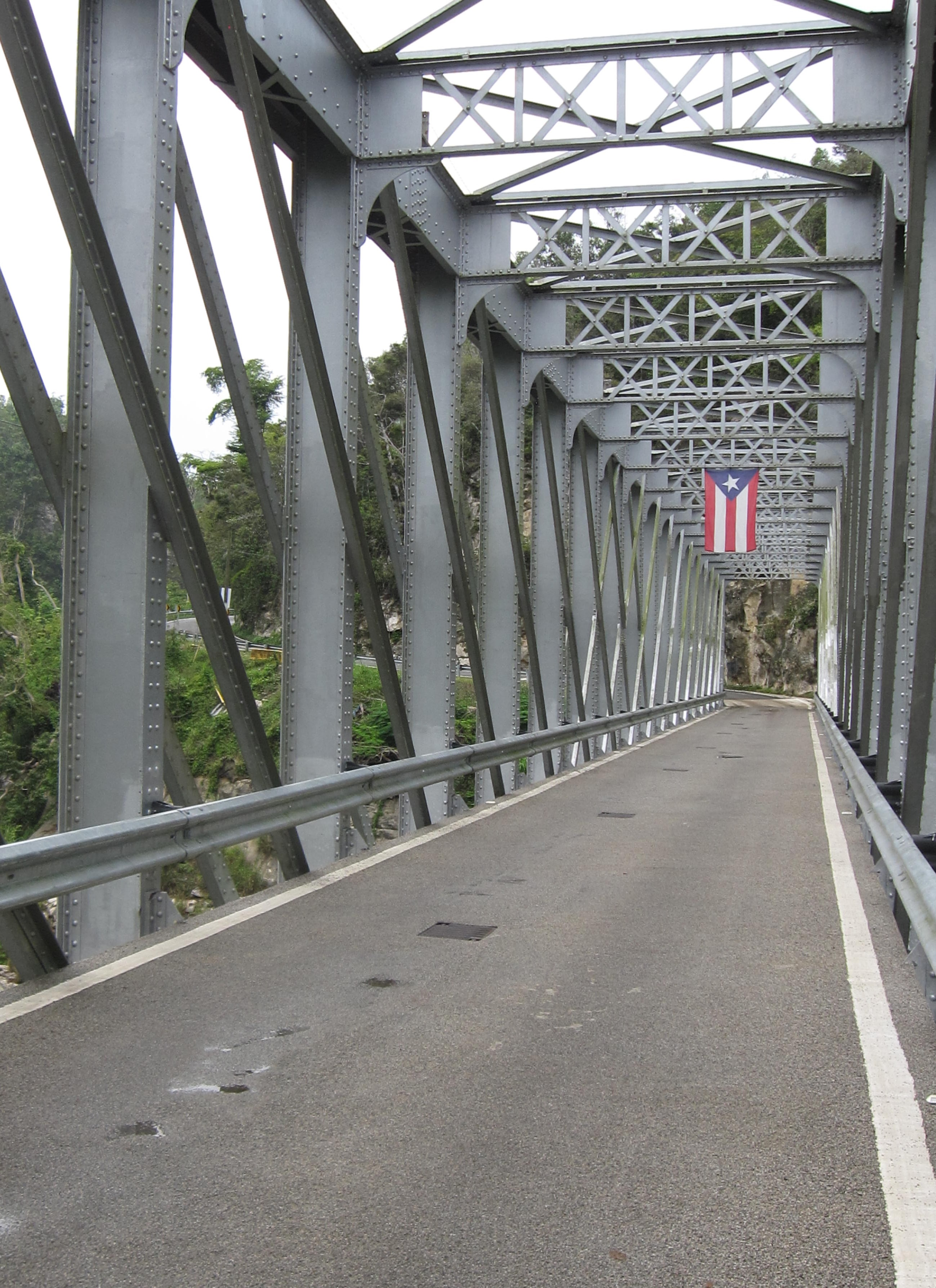
- Historic Manatí Bridge at Mata de Plátano

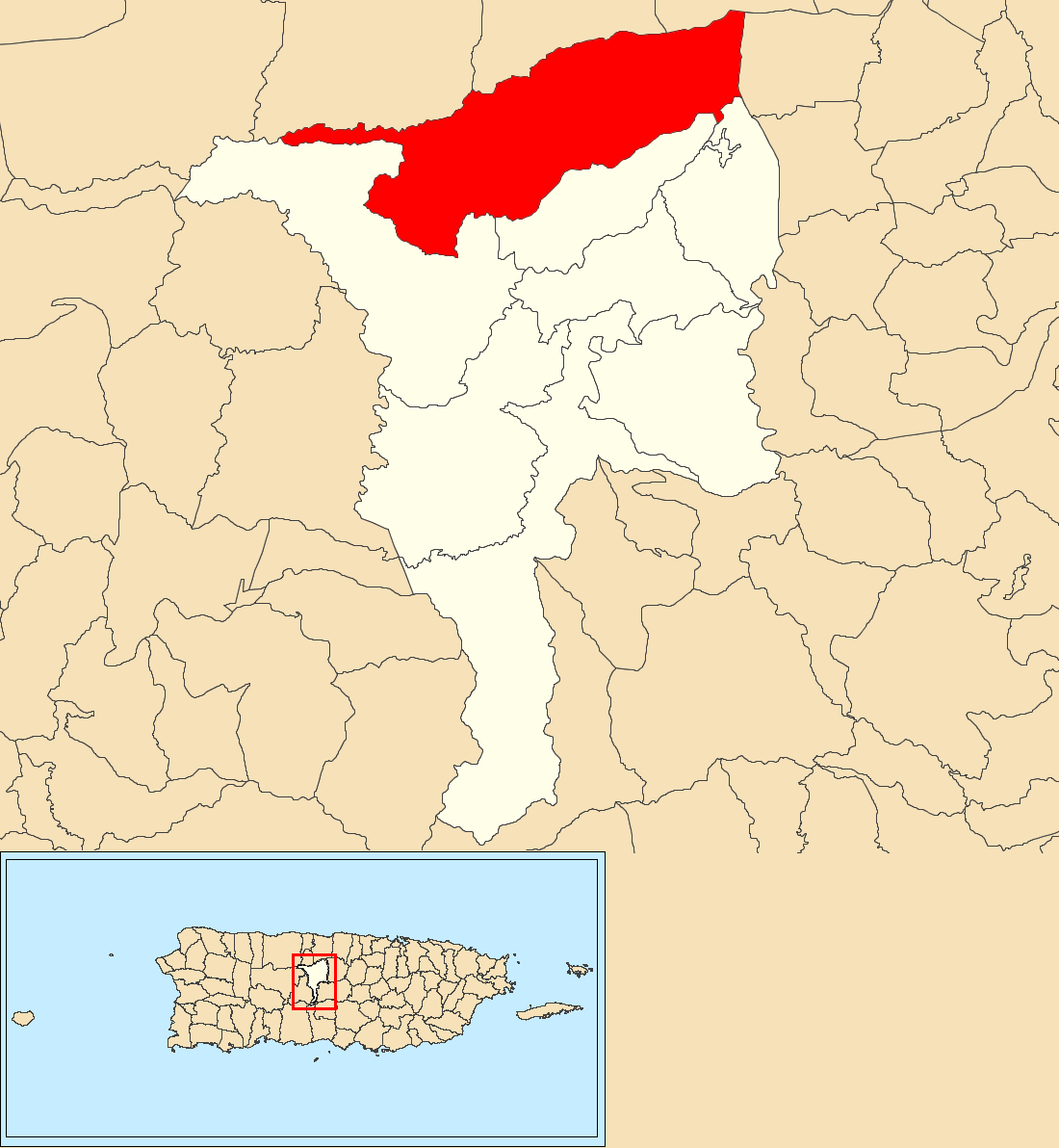
- Location of Hato Viejo within the municipality of Ciales shown in red

- Location of Puerto Rico
- Coordinates: 18°20′33″N 66°31′21″W
- Commonwealth: Puerto Rico
- Municipality: Ciales

Area
  - Total: 13.23 sq mi (34.3 km^{2})
  - Land: 13.17 sq mi (34.1 km^{2})
  - Water: 0.06 sq mi (0.16 km^{2})
- Elevation: 715 ft (218 m)

Population (2010)
  - Total: 2,442
  - Density: 185.4/sq mi (71.6/km^{2})
- Source: 2010 Census
- Time zone: UTC−4 (AST)
- ZIP Code: 00638
- Area code: 787/939

Hato Viejo is a barrio in the municipality of Ciales, Puerto Rico. Its population in 2010 was 2,442. Hato Viejo has more than a dozen sectors, a historic bridge, and folklore about a boy and a cave.

== History ==
Hato Viejo was in Spain's gazetteers until Puerto Rico was ceded by Spain in the aftermath of the Spanish–American War under the terms of the Treaty of Paris of 1898 and became an unincorporated territory of the United States. In 1899, the United States Department of War conducted a census of Puerto Rico finding that the population of Hato Viejo barrio was 1,800.

In August 2020, the United States released Federal Emergency Management Agency funds in support of the coffee industry, directly benefitting a coffee processing plant in Hato Viejo barrio. The funds were appropriated in response to millions of dollars lost by the agricultural industry of Puerto Rico when Hurricane Maria hit Puerto Rico on September 20, 2017.

Historical population
Census	Pop.	Note	%±
1900	1,800		—
1910	2,077		15.4%
1920	1,883		−9.3%
1930	2,719		44.4%
1940	2,930		7.8%
1950	1,951		−33.4%
1960	1,842		−5.6%
1970	1,397		−24.2%
1980	1,518		8.7%
1990	2,232		47.0%
2000	2,444		9.5%
2010	2,442		−0.1%
U.S. Decennial Census; 1899 (shown as 1900) 1910-1930; 1930-1950 1980-2000 2010

== Features ==
The Manatí Bridge at Mata de Plátano, built in 1905, is located in Hato Viejo and is touted as a tourist site. It connects Ciales to Manatí, a neighboring municipality.

== Sectors ==
Barrios (which are roughly comparable to minor civil divisions) in turn are further subdivided into smaller local populated place areas/units called sectores (sectors in English). The types of sectores may vary, from normally sector to urbanización to reparto to barriada to residencial, among others.

The following sectors are in Hato Viejo barrio:

Sector Caliche, Sector Campamento, Sector Cuchillas, Sector Cumbre, Sector El Cuco, Sector La Grama, Sector Las Lajas, Sector Las Lomas, Sector Los Arnao, Sector Los Barberos, Sector Los Rosa, Sector Los Otero, Urbanización Alturas de Ciales, and Urbanización Monterrey.

== Folklore ==
El niño de Caliche is a legend about a boy from Caliche Sector. The legend says a mother who was working picking fruit had her son with her and that because he kept frolicking around her, she asked him to stay in the cave while she labored. Each time she took him to the cave he followed her back to work. In her final attempt to have her son wait for her at the cave while she worked she sang him a song as she slowly walked away. One verse song reads, "...Ay, turulete, Ay turulete, que el que no tiene vaca no bebe leche.." (transl. Oh, turulete, oh turulete, he who has no cow, drinks no milk...). She never returned for the boy, night fell, and the boy began to cry. Locals say they hear a boy crying near the cave, and see him frolicking and when they try to catch him, he disappears, only to reappear again steps away.

== Gallery ==
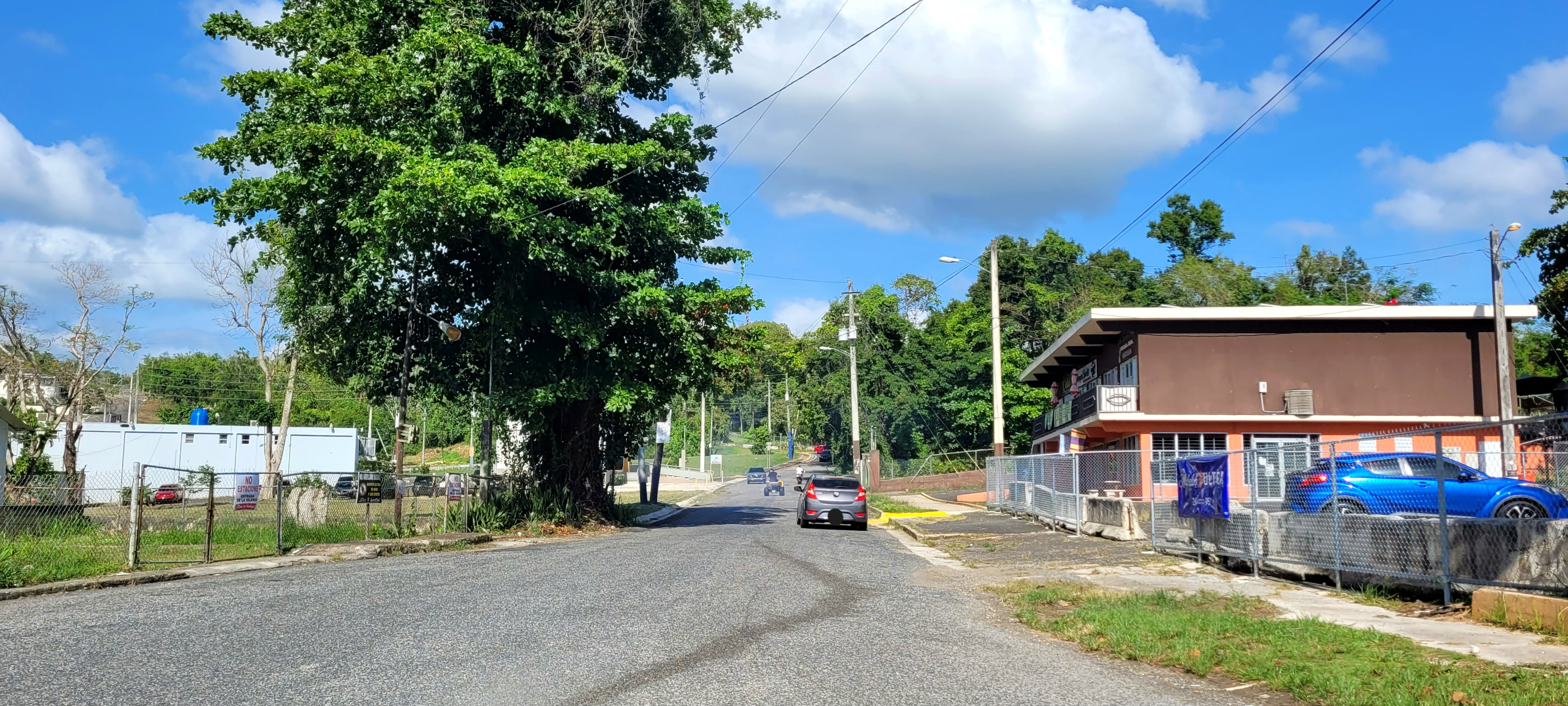
Puerto Rico Highway 6633 in Hato Viejo

== See also ==
- List of communities in Puerto Rico
- List of barrios and sectors of Ciales, Puerto Rico
