= Marlese Sifre =

Puerto Rican politician

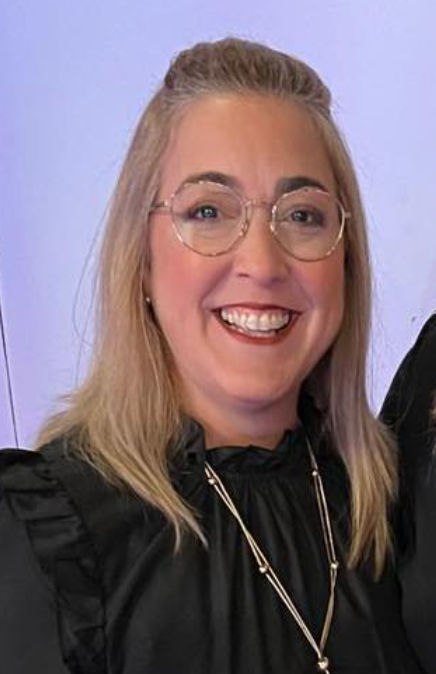
- Sifre in 2024

137th Mayor of Ponce, Puerto Rico
- Incumbent
- Assumed office January 13, 2025; Interim: November 2, 2023 – January 12, 2025
- Preceded by: Luis Irizarry Pabón

Personal details
- Born: San Juan, Puerto Rico
- Party: Popular Democratic Party
- Children: 1
- Education: Interamerican University of Puerto Rico (BCJ); Facultad de Derecho Eugenio Maria de Hostos (JD)

Marlese Sifre Rodríguez is a Puerto Rican politician who has served as the mayor of Ponce since 2023. She previously worked in municipal government roles starting in 2000 and held the position of interim mayor before being elected to the office.

== Early life and education ==
Marlese Sifre Rodríguez was born in San Juan, Puerto Rico, but was raised in Ponce. Her upbringing was significantly influenced by her mother, Anita Rodríguez, and her stepfather, Gilberto "Tito" Berenguer. She pursued a Bachelor of Criminal Justice at the Interamerican University of Puerto Rico and her legal education at the Facultad de Derecho Eugenio Maria de Hostos, from which she graduated.

== Career ==
Sifre began her career in public service in 2000 during the administration of mayor Rafael Cordero Santiago in Ponce. She served as an assistant to the then vice mayor, Delis Castillo Rivera de Santiago. At the time, she was studying for her bar exam and was exposed to aspects of municipal governance.

Under the administration of Francisco Zayas Seijo, Sifre managed the "Mano a Mano" office and oversaw the Public Order Code. However, her career faced challenges during the administration of María Meléndez from 2009 to 2020, a period marked by financial difficulties for municipal employees. Sifre became an advocate for their rights.

In 2021, she was appointed vice mayor under Luis Irizarry Pabón. Following his suspension in 2023, she assumed the role of interim mayor of Ponce on November 2. During this period, she focused on fiscal responsibility, administrative restructuring, and maintaining municipal services.

During the 2024 Puerto Rican municipal elections, Sifre announced her candidacy for mayor after the Popular Democratic Party confirmed that the suspended mayor would not return. Her campaign emphasized economic development and housing initiatives, and in November 2024, she was elected mayor of Ponce. She assumes the office on January 13, 2025.

== Personal life ==
In 2007, Sifre underwent an emergency surgery to remove a tumor located in the fourth ventricle of her brain. She described the procedure as life-altering due to the potential risks associated with the condition.

Sifre is married to Juan Carlos Rivera Guillén, with whom she has one daughter. The family faced financial hardships during periods of reduced municipal budgets.
