= Parque Urbano Dora Colón Clavell =

Passive park in Ponce, Puerto Rico

Parque Urbano Dora Colón Clavell (Dora Colón Clavell Urban Park)
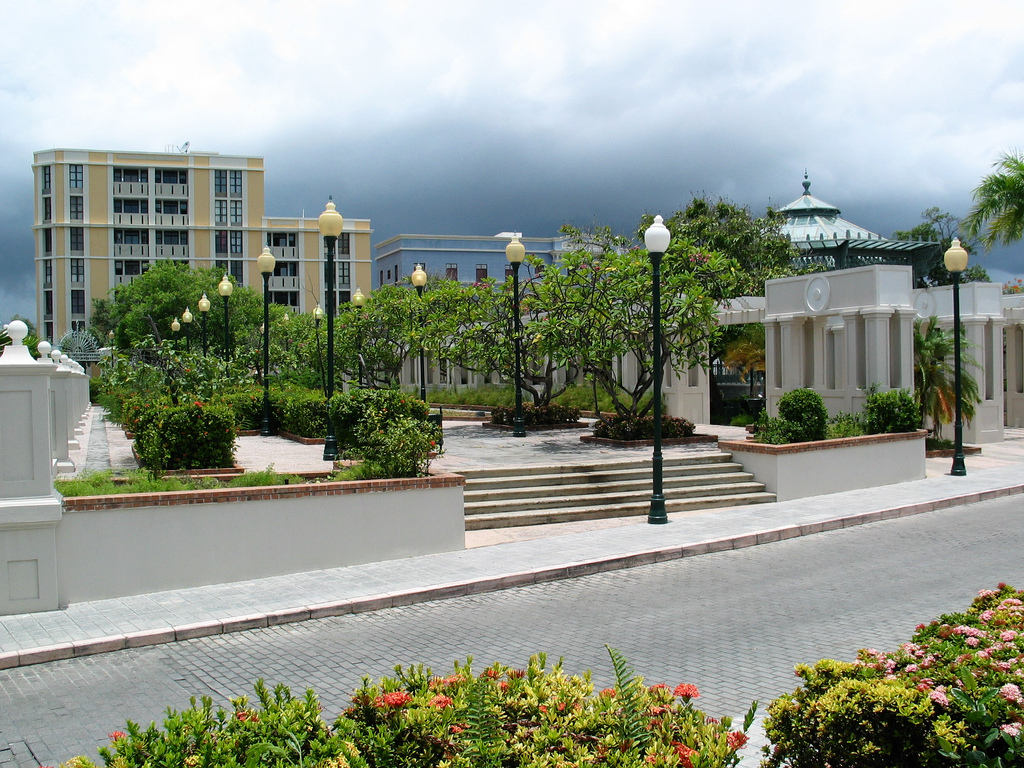
- The Dora Colon Clavell Urban Park, looking north in Barrio Primero in Ponce, Puerto Rico
- Interactive map of Parque Urbano Dora Colón Clavell (Dora Colón Clavell Urban Park)
- Type: Passive park
- Location: Marina and Jobos Streets, Barrio Primero, in Ponce, Puerto Rico
- Coordinates: 18°00′29.15″N 66°36′50.04″W
- Area: approx 4 cuerdas
- Created: 1995
- Opened: 9 December 1995
- Designer: William Ramirez Gurratán
- Operator: Autonomous Municipality of Ponce
- Open: Daily
- Status: Open
- Parking: Underground parking garage (400 spaces)

Parque Urbano Dora Colón Clavell (English: Dora Colón Clavell Urban Park) is a passive park in Ponce, Puerto Rico. The park is named after the mother of ex-governor of Puerto Rico and Ponce native, Rafael Hernández Colón. It opened on 9 December 1995. The park was designed by Ponce architect Juan Dalmau Sambolín.

== Location ==
The park is a passive urban family park. It is located in Ponce's Historic District, near several museums and parks, including the Ponce Massacre Museum and the Abolition Park. It features a number of kiosks that open on an as-needed basis (i.e., depending on the function taking place at the park) and a central stage where the Banda Municipal de Ponce stages free open-air concerts. The location where the park now sits used to be occupied by Hospital Damas before it moved to its current location on Ponce By Pass on 6 May 1973.

== History ==
The park was built in 1995 under the administration of mayor Churumba and, in the same year, it received the award for Outstanding Construction Work of the Year (Spanish: "Obra Sobresaliente del Año") from the College of Engineers and Surveyors of Puerto Rico. It was built with an original appropriation of $5.5 million. Final cost in December 1995 was $11 million.

== Amenities ==
The park features gardens, a Mudéjar-style kiosk for the Ponce Municipal Band traditional Sunday concerts, a trolley stop, a restaurant, and food stands. This Mudéjar-style kiosk is a smaller replica of the one built on Plaza Las Delicias, in 1882, but since demolished, for the town's 1882 Feria-Exposición. It was designed by José Carlos Villaró, a Spanish architect from Málaga.

The park also has an underground parking garage with two levels. In the first (top-most) level of the garage there is a Ponce tourist police station. The parking garage has space for 400 vehicles.

== See also ==
- History of the Autonomous City of Ponce
