= Luis Irizarry Pabón =

Puerto Rican politician

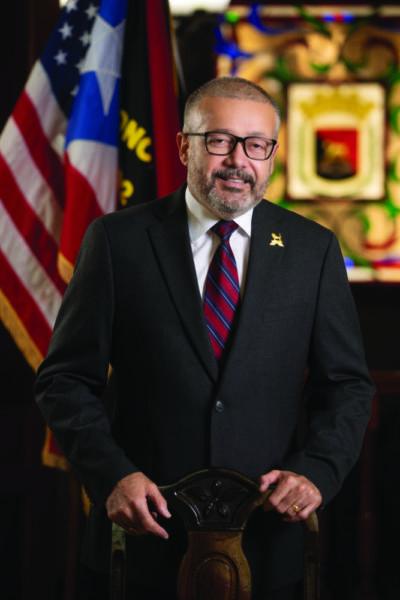

136th Mayor of Ponce, Puerto Rico
- In office 10 January 2021 (Note: Es Noticia states his term started on 13 January 2021.) – 1 November 2023
- Preceded by: María Meléndez
- Succeeded by: Marlese Sifre

Member of the Municipal Assembly of Ponce, Puerto Rico
- In office 12 January 2009 – 10 January 2021

Minority leader of Municipal Assembly of Ponce, Puerto Rico
- In office 12 January 2009 – 10 January 2021
- Preceded by: Roberto Gonzaléz Rosa
- Succeeded by: Gloryvee Berenguer Garcia

Personal details
- Born: 12 November 1958 (age 67) Ponce, Puerto Rico
- Party: Partido Popular Democrático (PPD)
- Spouse: Miyady Velazquez
- Relations: Félix Irizarry and Carmen Lydia Pabón (parents)
- Children: Alma, Luis Manuel, María Isabel, and Yaniel
- Education: University of Puerto Rico School of Medicine: M.D.
- Profession: Politician, internist
- Website: Municipality of Ponce (Spanish)

Luis Manuel Irizarry Pabón (b. Ponce, Puerto Rico; 12 November 1958) is a former mayor of the municipality of Ponce, Puerto Rico.

Marlese Sifre was appointed as Vice-Mayor which granted to be the third woman in charge.

== Biography ==
Luis Manuel Irizarry Pabón was born on 12 November 1958 in Ponce, Puerto Rico. His parents were Félix Irizarry and Carmen Lydia Pabón. A graduate of the University of Puerto Rico School of Medicine, Irizarry Pabón was an internal medicine physician prior to becoming Ponce's mayor-elect in November 2020. He was also a municipal legislator in the Ponce Municipal Legislature for 12 years (2009 to 2021), and minority leader in said legislative body. Winning by a landslide against Partido Nuevo Progresista incumbent mayor María Meléndez, Irizarry Pabón was scheduled to take office on 11 January 2021. He was sworn on 13 January 2021. He is a graduate of the School of Medicine of the Universidad de Puerto Rico, Recinto de Ciencias Medicas.

== Political ==
Upon completion of the 2020 Ponce municipal election vote count Irizarry Pabón had received 28,728 votes (62%) to incumbent mayor María Meléndez Altieri's 12,314 votes (26.6%). The rest of the votes cast were for MVC and PIP. Irizarry Pabón is the first mayoral candidate in the modern history of Ponce to win with more than 60% of votes cast. His 16,414 vote margin was also historic being the largest since 1996, when then-mayor Rafael Cordero Santiago had a lead of over 19,000 votes versus José Dapena Thompson. Irizarry Pabón recovered the Ponce mayoral office for his PPD party after 12 years under the control of the Partido Nuevo Progresista (PNP).

The municipal executive was suspended from his position on November 1, 2023 after cause was found for arrest against him on four charges presented precisely by the Office of the Panel on the Special Independent Prosecutor (OPFEI), which accuse him of violations of Article 4.2 of the Government Ethics Law and Article 251 of the Penal Code, for alleged unjustified enrichment. (Source: Primera Hora, https://www.primerahora.com/noticias/gobierno-politica/notas/luis-irizarry-pabon-continuara-suspendido-al-cargo-de-alcalde-de-ponce/)

In June 2004, Puerto Rico newspaper El Nuevo Dia, reported, "Suspended Ponce Mayor Luis Irizarry Pabón will face a jury trial after August for allegedly coercing municipal agency heads to pay his personal debt that amounted to more than $53,000." (Source: El Nuevo Dia)

== Family and personal ==
As of 11 November 2020, Irizarry Pabón was 62 years old. He has four children: Alma, Luis Manuel, María Isabel, and Yaniel.

== Notes ==
Political offices
Preceded by María Meléndez	Mayor of Ponce, Puerto Rico; 2021–present	Succeeded by
