= Francisco Zayas Seijo =

Puerto Rican politician

Francisco R. Zayas Seijo
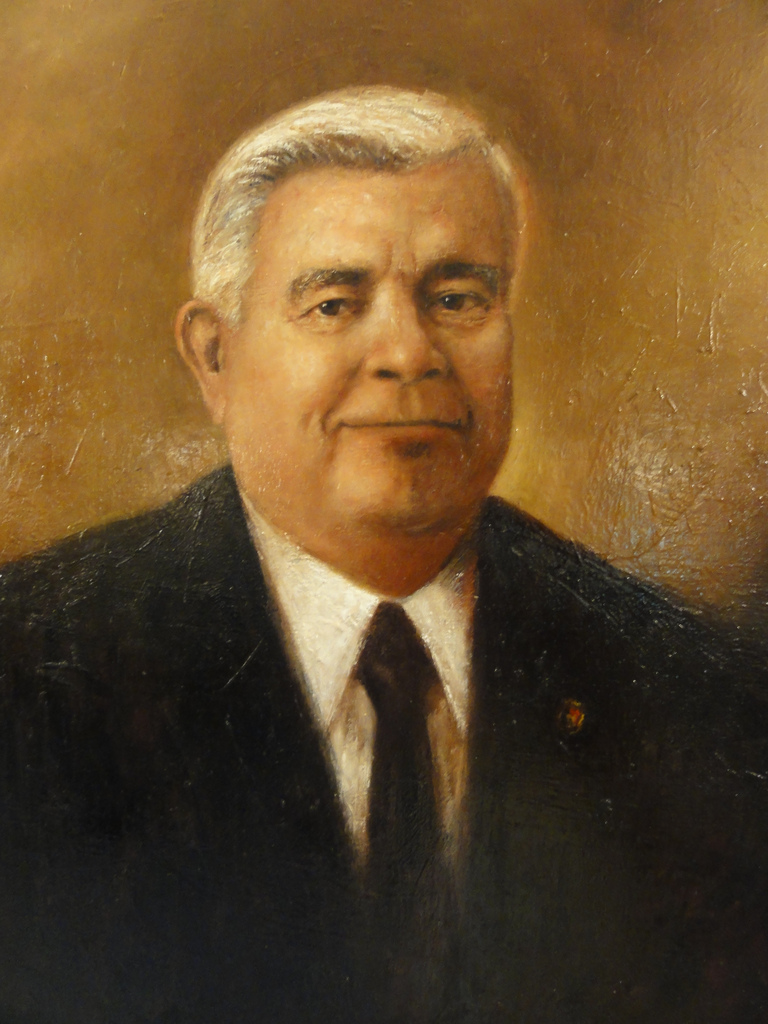
- Mayor Francisco R. Zayas Seijo

134th Mayor of Ponce, Puerto Rico
- In office 9 January 2005 – 2 January 2009
- Preceded by: Delis Castillo Rivera de Santiago
- Succeeded by: María Meléndez

Member of the Puerto Rico House of Representatives from the 25th District Ponce, Jayuya
- In office 2 January 1993 – 2 January 2004
- Succeeded by: Piro Reyes

Personal details
- Born: 4 October 1951 (age 74) Santurce, Puerto Rico
- Party: Popular Democratic Party (PPD)
- Spouse: Nancy Colón
- Children: 4 (Francisco, Rafael and 3 others)
- Education: University of Puerto Rico at Mayagüez (BA); University of Pennsylvania School of Veterinary Medicine (DVM)
- Profession: Veterinarian; politician

Francisco R. Zayas Seijo, also known as Ico (born 4 October 1951), is a former member of the Puerto Rico House of Representatives and mayor of the city of Ponce, Puerto Rico. During his 4-year mayoral term, Zayas Seijo established the Mariana Suárez de Longo Library and Historical Archive of Ponce, the Museo del Autonomismo Puertorriqueño, the Centro Ponceño de Autismo (English: Ponce Center for Autism), the Agüeybaná II "El Bravo" Plaza, and also expanded the Julio Enrique Monagas Family Park. He initiated to the concept of the Centro de Convenciones de Ponce and the Ponce Aquarium; however, neither one of these two saw fruition before he completed his term in January 2009. He was, however, instrumental in the development of the Parque Lineal Veredas del Labrador, as well as the Río Portugués Dam and the expansion of the Ponce Municipal Police. During his administration, the Municipal Police acquired, installed, and put into operation 106 street cameras and a video command center. These were complemented by 130 additional cameras installed by the Puerto Rico Police.

== Early life ==
Zayas Seijo was born on 4 October 1951, in Santurce, Puerto Rico to Héctor Zayas Chardón and Dr. Esther Seijo Tizol. Both his parents were actively involved with former Governor Luis Muñoz Marín. He is a first cousin to journalist Jorge Seijo.

When he was 16 years old, Zayas Seijo enrolled at the College of Agriculture and Mechanical Arts of Mayagüez where he obtained a bachelor's degree in agronomy. Afterwards, he was accepted at the Veterinary School of the University of Pennsylvania in 1975 where he completed his doctoral degree in veterinary medicine.

Upon marrying Nancy Colón in 1973, they moved to Ponce.

== Career and work ==
In 1975 he established a successful veterinary clinic in Ponce. He also worked at several universities and gathered much recognition for his work. In 1980, he was selected as Distinguished Youth by the Who's Who in Young American People.

== Political career ==
Zayas Seijo got involved in politics in 1984 when Raúl Ramírez, mayoral candidate, recruited him to be part of his team. Even though they were defeated, Zayas established himself as the minority spokesman. He remained in that position until 1991.

That year, his uncle, Humberto Zayas Chardón, retired from politics and vacated the seat he occupied in the Puerto Rico House of Representatives. Zayas ran for the post and was elected. He represented the 25th Representative District (Ponce and Jayuya) for 13 years. He presided the House's Comisión de Hacienda (English: Treasury Commission) during the administration of governor Sila Calderón.

In 2000 he presided over an important commission that investigated government financial procedures a few months before the general election. The work he did garnered him all sort of criticism from his political opposition.

In 2004, Zayas Seijo was elected unanimously as the official candidate for the mayoral seat in Ponce, after the death of long-time mayor Rafael Cordero Santiago. On 2 November 2004, he was elected mayor of Ponce by an ample margin. He was sworn into office on 9 January 2005.

On 4 November 2008, Zayas Seijo lost the election to the candidate of the New Progressive Party, María "Mayita" Meléndez Altieri and was succeeded on 2 January 2009.

== Legacy ==
Zayas Seijo is best remembered for the establishment of the Biblioteca y Archivo Histórico de Ponce Mariana Suárez de Longo (Mariana Suárez de Longo Library and Historical Archive of Ponce) at a cost of $10.5 million USD. He also established the Museum of Puerto Rican Autonomism at Panteón Nacional Román Baldorioty de Castro in 2006. He started construction of the Centro de Convenciones de Ponce and gave birth to the concept of the Ponce Aquarium. However, neither one was completed by the time Zayas' administration came to an end in January 2009. In October 2008, Zayas Seijo inaugurated Plaza Agüeybaná II "El Bravo" at the intersection of PR-123 and PR-2 in the Caracoles sector of barrio Playa, Ponce. A plaque at the site marks the inauguration of the park dedicated to the memory of the leader of the last Taíno battle against the Spanish invaders in 1511. Zayas Seijo is also credited with expanding the Julio Enrique Monagas Family Park in October 2008, and with the establishment of the Centro Ponceño de Autismo during his tenure.

== Personal life ==
Zayas has been married to Nancy Colón since 1973. They have four children together.

== See also ==
- Rafael Cordero Santiago

Political offices
Preceded by Delis Castillo (Interim)	Mayor of Ponce, Puerto Rico; 9 January 2005 – 2 January 2009	Succeeded by María Meléndez Altieri
