= Vicens =

Vicens or Vicéns is a surname. Notable people with the surname include:

- Antonio J. Vicéns (born 1947), Puerto Rican military officer
- Enrique A. Vicéns (born 1943), Puerto Rican politician
- Gabriel Vicéns (born 1988), Puerto Rican jazz musician
- Jaume Vicéns i Vives (1910–1960), Spanish historian
- Josefina Vicens (1911–1988), Mexican writer
- Juan "Pachín" Vicéns (1934–2007), Puerto Rican basketball player
- Rafael Antonio "Feyo" Vicéns Torresola (1920–2010) Farmer, teacher, Cooperative Movement leader, photographer from Jayuya

== See also ==
- Casa Vicéns, residence in Barcelona, Spain
- Auditorio Juan Pachín Vicéns, sports venue in Puerto Rico
