= Policía Municipal de Ponce =

Police force for the municipality of Ponce, Puerto Rico

Policía Municipal de Ponce Ponce Municipal Police
- Abbreviation: PMP
- Motto: Proteccion, Seguridad; Protection, Security

Agency overview
- Formed: 1902 (organized); 1977 (reorganized)
- Employees: 421 (as of February 2012)

Jurisdictional structure
- Operations jurisdiction: Ponce, Puerto Rico
- Map of Policía Municipal de Ponce's jurisdiction (in red)
- Area: 193.6 sq mi (501.44 km^{2})
- Population: 196,590
- Legal jurisdiction: Ponce, Puerto Rico
- Governing body: Autonomous Municipality of Ponce
- General nature: Local civilian police

Operational structure
- Headquarters: Ave. Las Américas and Carretera Pámpanos
- Police Officers: over 400
- Agency executive: Juan Gerardo Molina Perez, Police Commissioner
- Supervisions: List: Highway Patrol; Special Services Unit; Community Relations; Fast Response Unit; Motorize Unit; Maritime Unit; Turistic Unit; K-9 Unit; Cycle Patrol Unit; Investigations Unit; Protection and Surveillance; Transportation Unit; Amber Alert Task Force; U.I.V.C.C.

Facilities
- Precincts: List: Digital Command Center - Ave. Hostos; Cantera; Guancha; Coto Laurel; Fullana
- Police Cars: Ford Crown Victoria Police Interceptor; Chevrolet Trailblazer; Chevrolet Impala
- Edwin Torres Ortiz, Teniente Coronel

The Policía Municipal de Ponce (English: Ponce Municipal Police) is the main police force for the municipality of Ponce, Puerto Rico, with jurisdiction in the entire municipality, including all 31 barrios of Ponce. It was created in 1867 and reorganized in 1977.

== History ==
The history of the Ponce Municipal Police dates back to at least 1867, having not only an armed police force but also a complete set of bylaws specifying its organization and ranks, equipment (including uniform and firearms), service standards and code of conduct, procedures and reporting, training, pay and benefits, and duty and accountability. It is clear from the 1867 municipal police reorganization that, even prior to 1867, there was already a police force in place as the reorganization also makes reference to absorbing "the existing corps in place on the date of this reorganization". It had its headquarters on the first floor of Casa Ayuntamiento.

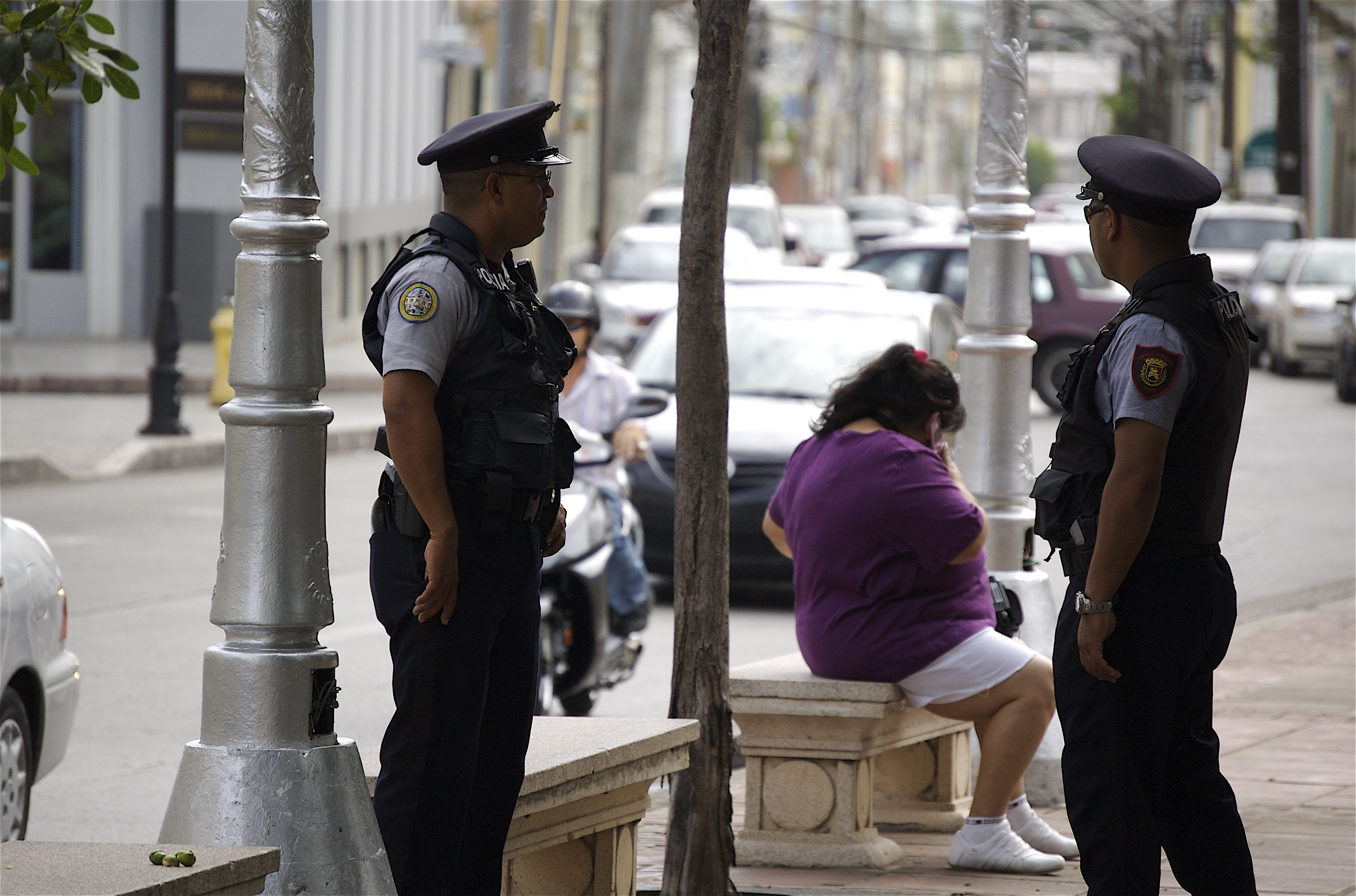
Policia Municipal de Ponce on patrol at Plaza Las Delicias

In 1895 Ponce mayor Juan José Potous issued an "Informe de Necesidades" (Needs Report) where he listed the following regarding his objectives in reference to the "Cuerpo de Policia Municipal" (Municipal Police Corps):

- Improve the Municipal Police Corps to where it can provide complete and efficient security in the City and its rural barrios at all hours
- Place a sergeant in Barrio Playa on a permanent basis
- Establish the position of barrio police deputy, providing a stipend for expenses such that such service will not be a burden
- Set up a budget for confidential and ancillary police expenses.

Observations about the Ponce municipal police reveal that, in 1901, the Puerto Rico Federal Party, of which Luis Muñoz Rivera was its leader, considered the Ponce municipal police chief, Rodulfo Figueroa, "a highly controversial figure" for his association with "dangerous" elements of the lower class. Nevertheless, the association was later regarded as a way of developing strong ties with both upper and lower classes of society.

The report from the Military Governor of Puerto Rico in 1902 also makes reference to the municipal police force in the city of Ponce. (Note: There was also in Ponce a presence of the Policia Insular, located at the jail for the Second District in Ponce. The Insular Police Second District was composed of posts at Precinct #1, composed of Juana Diaz, Villalba, Santa Isabel, Corral Viejo; District #2, composed of Aibonito, Coamo, Barranquitas, Barros (now Orocovis); and District #3, composed of Peñuelas, Adjuntas, Almacigo Abajo (now part of Yauco), and Guayanilla. Because the law passed on 31 January 1901 creating an insular police did not apply to towns with a population over 6,000 inhabitants, the enforcement work of the insular police in Ponce was limited to work at the Jail for the Second District located in Ponce, not to the municipality of Ponce proper. (See https://books.google.com/books?id=73hsAAAAMAAJ&pg=PA159. First Annual Register of Porto Rico, July, 1901. William H. Hunt, Secretary of Porto Rico. Puerto Rico Secretary's Office. July 1901. page 159. Accessed 20 February 2018.)) At the time (1902), it was the only police force serving the municipality of Ponce. The Municipal Police was established by order of the Municipal Assembly, via Municipal Orders Number 104 and 136, and made effective as of 9 May 1903.

The Municipal Police was reorganized in 1977, when Law #19 of 12 May 1977, known as Ley de la Guardia Municipal (Municipal Guard Law) significantly increased its powers and duties. Since its re-establishment in September 1977, the Ponce Municipal Police has been growing in personnel and equipment. It is the second city police force in Puerto Rico to have an Amber Alert Task Force.

== Location ==
The Ponce Municipal Police headquarters are located on Avenida Las Américas and Carretera Pámpanos in barrio Canas at the Secretaría de Recreación y Deportes building. A new building, which used to be occupied by the Ponce regional headquarters of the Puerto Rico Police on Avenida Hostos in Barrio Canas Urbano, is currently under refurbishment to become the new headquarters of the Ponce Municipal Police. This second location currently still houses the control center of the Ponce Municipal Police which monitors the city's 334 security cameras. As of April 2012, the administrative offices of the Police Commissioner are located on the third floor of the Secretaria de Deportes on Avenida Las Américas, in barrio Canas. At one point there were also plans to headquarter the Ponce Municipal Police at the former Plaza del Mercado de Ponce, known as Edificio Bigas, once it was reconfigured, but the site may be used to headquarter only a precinct.

== Precincts ==
By 1992, Policía Municipal had spread to six precincts, namely, Playa (Barrio Playa), Bélgica (Barrio Cuarto), Barrio Coto Laurel, Glenview (Barrio Machuelo Arriba), Mariani (Barrio Canas Urbano), and Molina at Calle Vives (Barrio Segundo). (Note: In the summer of 2019, the Ponce Municipal Legislature approved a resolution for the lease or sale of the former Ponce Municipal Police headquarters at Calle Molina and Calle Vives streets.(See A la Venta Tricoche. Es Noticia. 21 June to 4 July 2019. Year 4. Issue 99. p. 18.))

Today (2018), Municipal Police precincts can also be found at La Guancha, Mariani (Fullana), Bélgica, and Cantera. There is also a tourist police precinct on the first underground level of the municipal parking garage at the Dora Colón Clavell Urban Park. The Transit Unit works out of the Mariani precinct, while the Maritime Unit works out of the La Guancha precinct.

The location of the units is as follows:

- Athletic League, Division of Internal Affairs, and the Office of the Municipal Police Commissioner - Third floor of the Secretaría de Recreación on Avenida Las Americas
- Transit and Community Units - Mariani (also known as the Fullana precinct)
- Digital Command Center - Former headquarters of the Puerto Rico Police on Avenida Hostos
- Motorized and Rapid Response Units - Bélgica
- Tourism and School Units - Parque Urbano Dora Colón Clavell
- Bicycle Unit - Cantera precinct
- Maritime Unit - La Guancha
- Prevention and Domestic Violence Units - Puerto Rico Police Headquarters at Urb. Los Caobos

There is also a canine unit.

Upon Puerto Rico Police for the Ponce region vacating its headquarters at the intersection of Avenida Hostos (PR-123) and Avenida Las Americas (PR-163) at the end of 2010, Ponce Mayor Mayita Meléndez announced plans in May 2011 to invest $2.4 million for the remodeling of such facilities to serve as the first consolidated headquarters of the Ponce Municipal Police.

== Authority ==
Until recently the Ponce Municipal Police had limited powers to make arrests and carry other such police activities without coordinating with the Puerto Rico Police. This changed on 29 July 2010, when Puerto Rico governor Luis Fortuño Burset signed various orders that increased the powers of the municipal police force, including making certain types of arrests without consulting with the Puerto Rico Police. The issuance of traffic violation summonses, which had traditionally been handled by the Transit Division of the Puerto Rico Police, is also an activity that according to law may be performed by the Municipal Police as well.

Amendments made to the Puerto Rico Municipal Police Code allows them to operate as if they were agents of the Puerto Rico Police.

== Commissioners ==
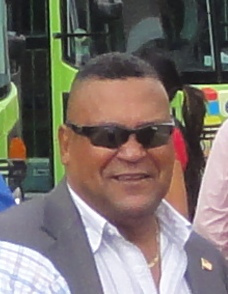
Ponce Municipal Police Commissioner Norberto Rodriguez Alicea (2010-2014)

Following are the commissioners of the Ponce Municipal Police since the force was created in 1977.

- 1977-1985: Coronel Pedro Rodríguez Seguín
- 1985-1987: Roberto Duque Santos
- 1987-1989: Norberto Rodríguez Alicea
- 1989-1995: Carlos Rodríguez
- 1995-1996: Eduardo Díaz Caraballo
- 1996-2004: Gilberto Colón Rodríguez
- 2004-2008: Alfredo Lugo Vera
- 2009-2010: Francisco Quiñones Rivera
- 2010-2014: Inspector Norberto Rodríguez Alicea
- 2014-2015: Lieutenant Elvin Pacheco Vélez (interim)
- 2015-2018: Inspector Angel Alvarez Boneta
- 2018-2020(?): Juan Gerardo Molina Perez
- 2021(?) - Incumbent: Pedro Quiles

== See also ==
- Puerto Rico Police - Ponce Area
