= Complejo Recreativo y Cultural La Guancha =

Recreational complex in Ponce, Puerto Rico

Complejo Recreativo y Cultural La Guancha La Guancha Recreational and Cultural Complex
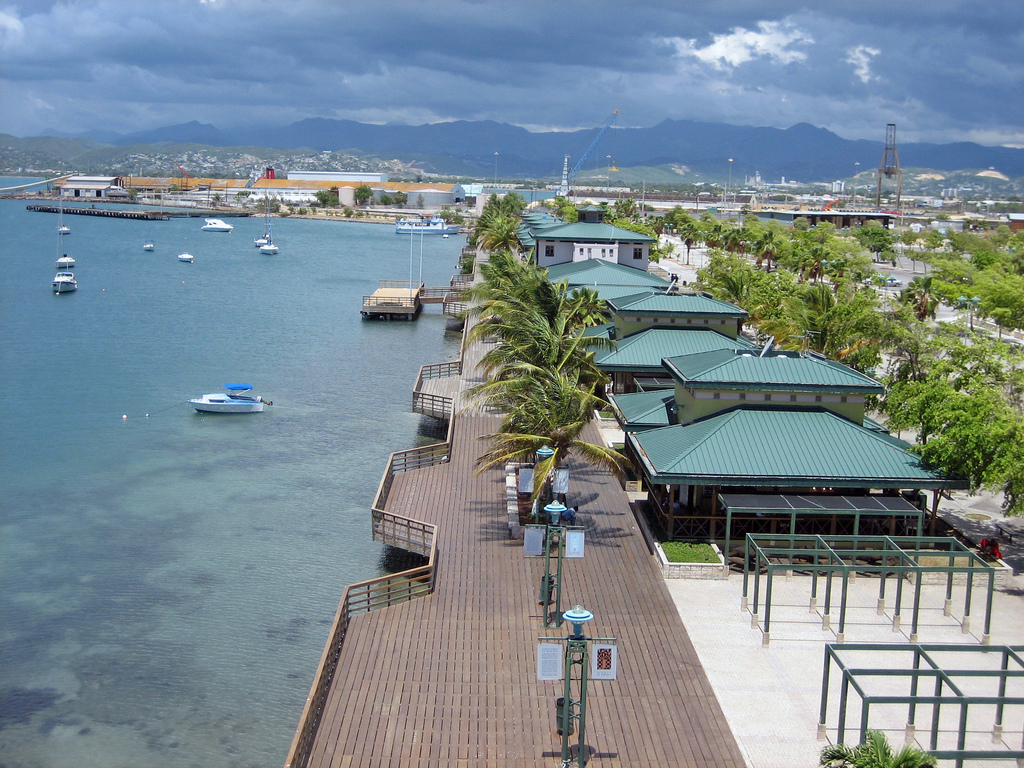
- Paseo Tablado La Guancha, the centerpice of the La Guancha Recreational Complex
- Interactive map of Complejo Recreativo y Cultural La Guancha; La Guancha Recreational and Cultural Complex
- Type: Passive park
- Location: Bario Playa, Ponce, Puerto Rico
- Coordinates: 17°57′55.3674″N 66°36′52.128″W
- Area: approx 20 cuerdas
- Created: 23 June 1998
- Operator: Autonomous Municipality of Ponce
- Status: Open every day
- Parking: Several areas with parking for about 900 vehicles

The Complejo Recreativo y Cultural La Guancha (English: La Guancha Recreational and Cultural Complex) is a recreational complex in barrio Playa in Ponce, Puerto Rico, with family recreational and cultural facilities that opened on 23 June 1998. The highlight of the complex is the Paseo Tablado La Guancha, which is flanked by a beach, an observation tower, an amphitheater, and 24 open-air kiosks. It was developed during the administration of Mayor Rafael Cordero Santiago. In October 2017, after Hurricane Maria, it closed to the public to undergo repairs but, as of January 2020, when the area suffered severe damage due to the 2020 Puerto Rico earthquakes, no repairs had been made and, as of 17 June 2020, it remained closed. By late 2020 arrangements were made for the merchants that operated from waterfront kiosks to reopen their businesses out of provisional facilities at a temporary location away from the waterfront while reconstruction of the waterfront area takes place.

== History ==
Originally La Guancha consisted of a road and sidewalk alongside a dike built close to the easternmost shore of barrio Playa across from Ponce Yacht Club. The romantic area was frequented by families and sweethearts alike, especially on weekends, for relaxation and bonding. During the administration of Mayor Cordero, however, a number of facilities were added to the La Guancha area at a cost of over $18 million, developing it into a new recreational complex. The new facilities followed the design of engineer Axel Bonilla Cortes.

== Facilities ==
Seven new facilities were added to the existing walkway area:

- The Dr. Enrique "Coco" Vicens Recreational and Cultural Center (Spanish: Centro Recreativo y Cultural Enrique "Coco" Vicéns), which consists of an open-air amphitheater for concert-type facilities and seating some 30,000 spectators. Its stage is known as "Tarima Hector Lavoe".
- A rides and amusement park area, intended for the celebration of Patron Saint's Day Festivals, fairs, and similar festivities
- The Jose Angel Zayas Colon Children's Park, with over 40 games for the youngsters, plus the (Julio and Geraldo) Chamorro-Franceschini Brothers Park, with facilities for the handicapped
- Several parking areas with parking for some 900 vehicles, and distributed throughout the complex
- A majestic fountain, as its main axis, displaying the city's Coat-of-arms and its iconic lion
- A multi-use building providing facilities for the Ponce Municipal Police, medical emergencies and ambulance, and other related agencies
- A nourished beach area with over 10,000 cubic meters of new sand that replenished and built up the previous beach area, and including five beach volleyball courts, gazebos, access ramps to the Caribbean Sea, and associated illumination.

This project complemented the recently inaugurated tourist pier in the nearby Port of Ponce, and which saw an investment of $4 million.

== Funding ==
The Complex was developed by the Department of Community and Economic Development of the Autonomous Municipality of Ponce at a cost of $18.6 million. The breakdown of the cost included $3.6 million in the acquisition of the Paseo Tablado La Guancha, 6.5 million in the purchase of over 27 acres (110,000 m^{2}) of land, $8.0 million in the construction of the project, $0.2 million for the bidding process, and $0.3 million for the upgrade of PR-12 (Avenida Santiago de los Caballeros) as infrastructure leading to the new complex.

External audio
- You may see some of La Guancha Recreational and Cultural Center HERE

== Effects of the 2020 Puerto Rico earthquake ==
The complex sustained damage due to the 2020 Puerto Rico earthquake.

== Gallery ==
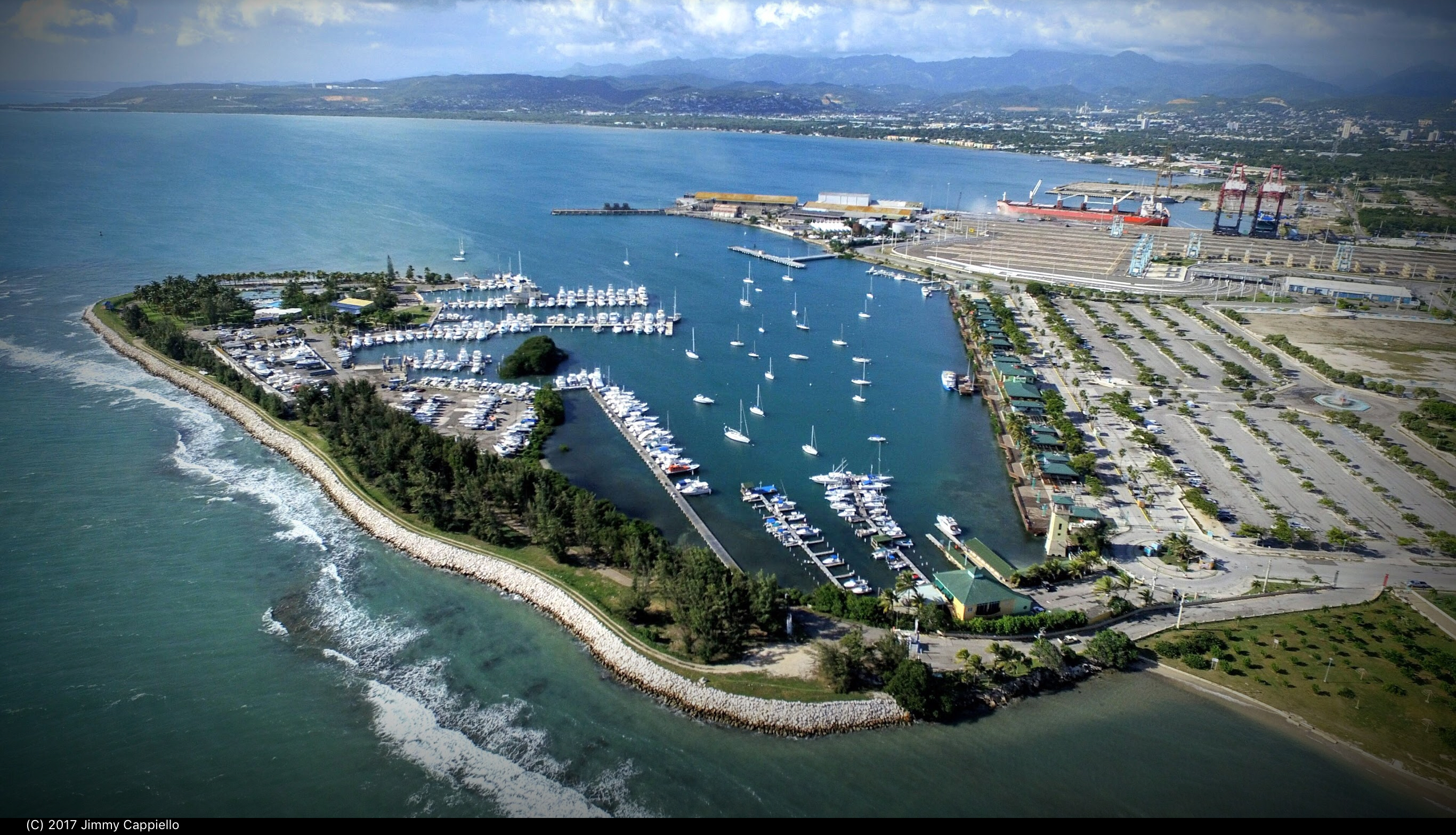
Aerial view of the Complex (right half)

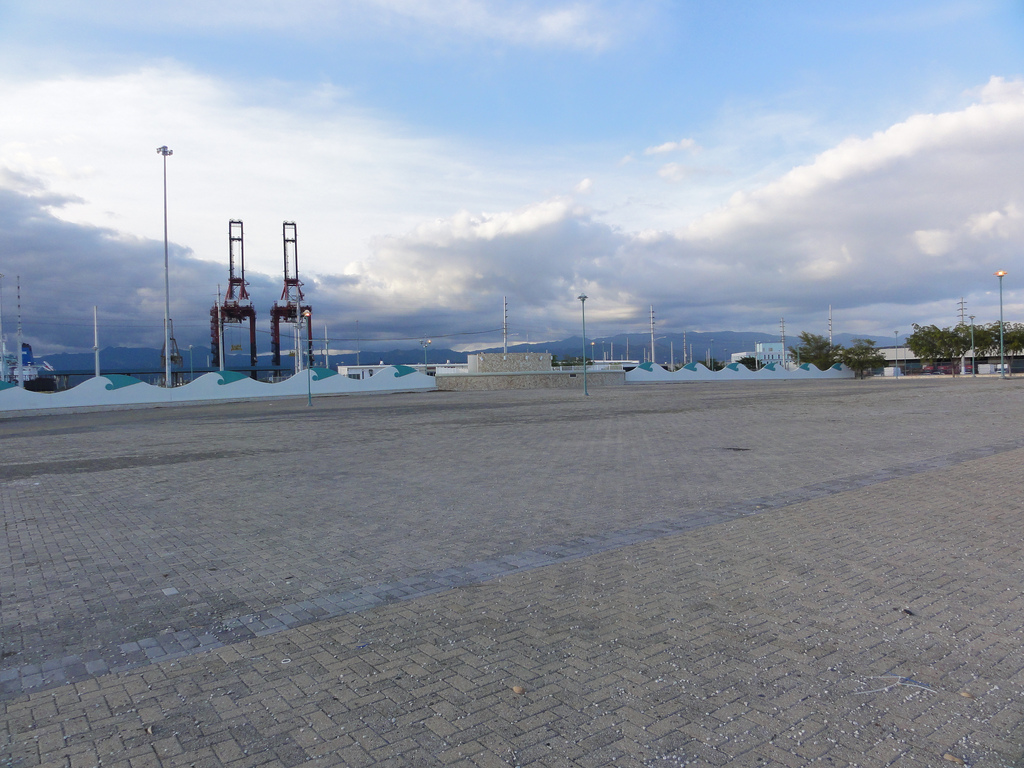
Hector Lavoe Rides and Amusement Plaza (Western End)

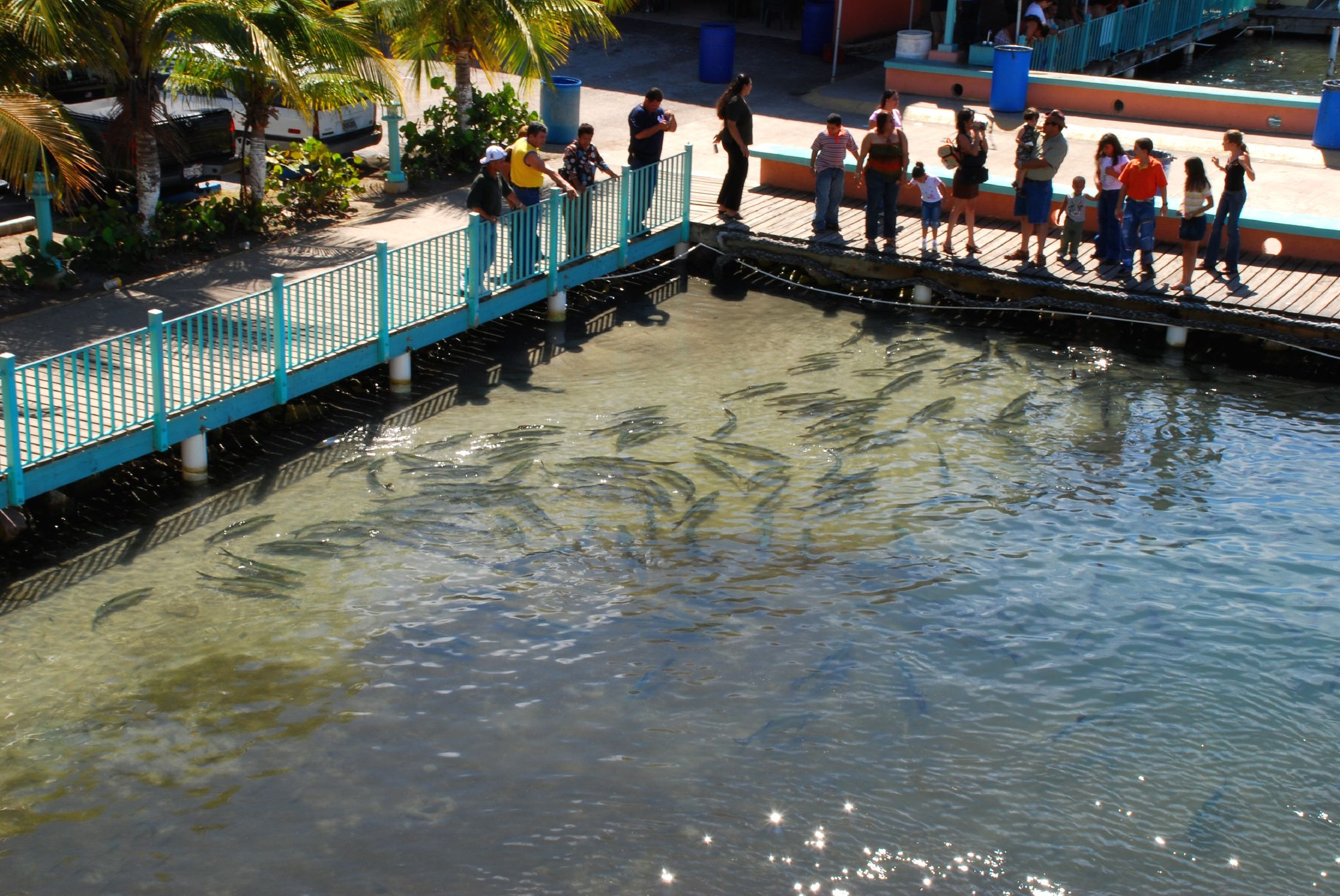
Children looking at fish at La Guancha

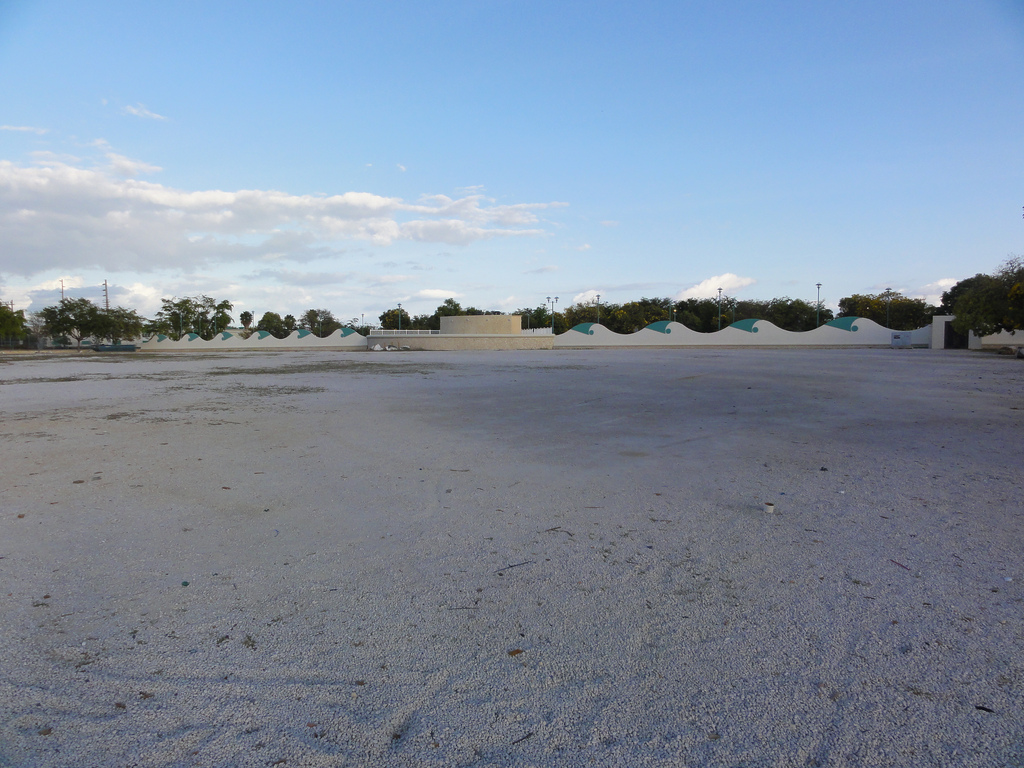
Rides and Amusement Park Area (Eastern End)

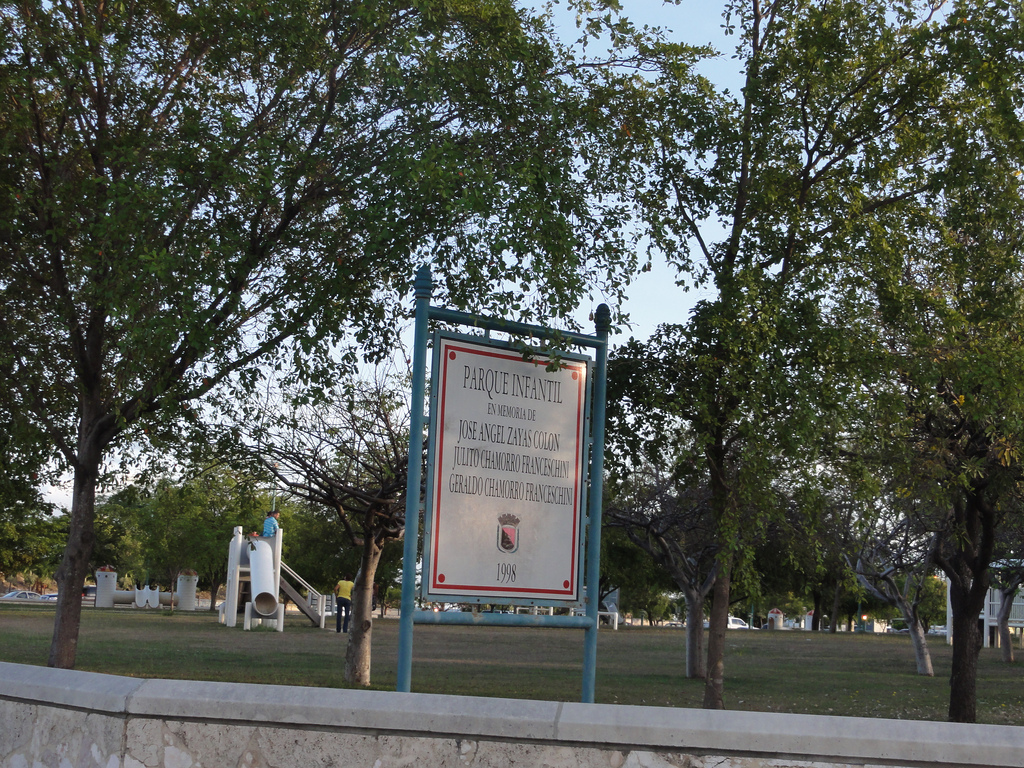
Jose Angel Zayas Colon Children's Park sign

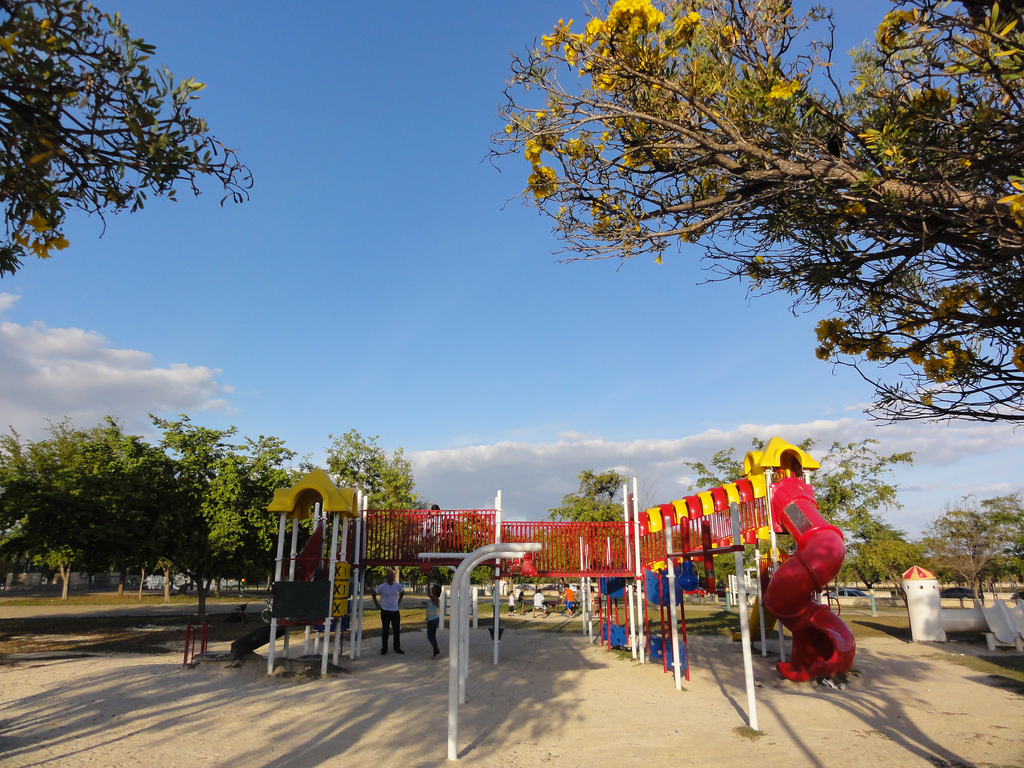
Children's Playground at the Jose Angel Zayas Colon Children's Park

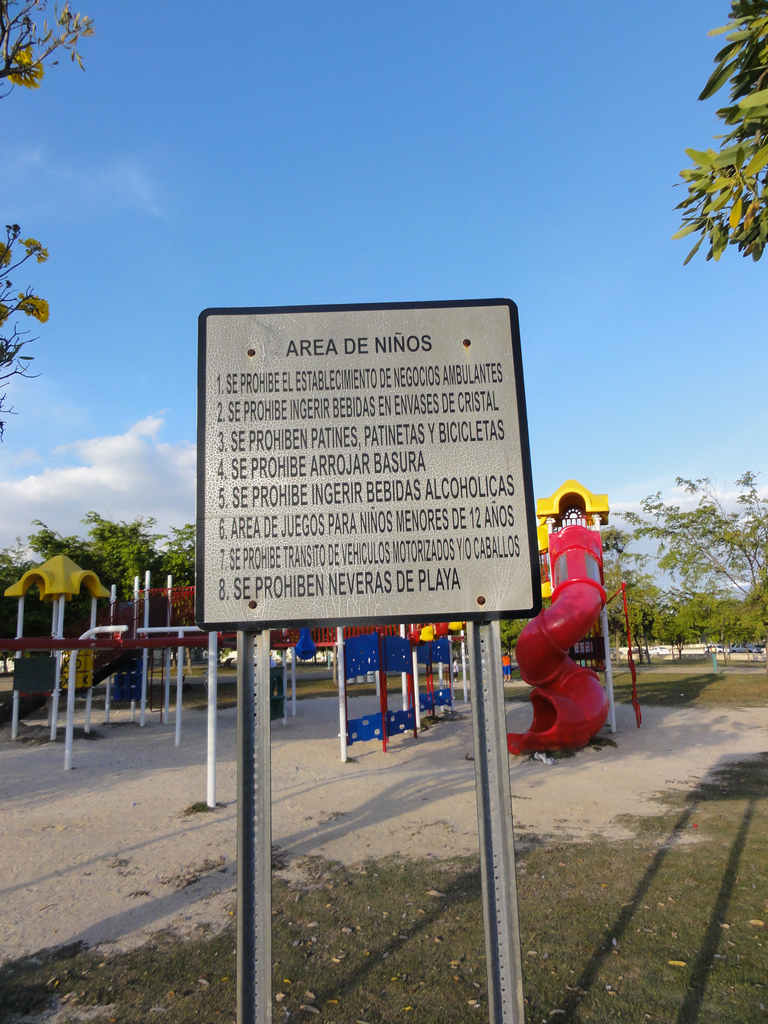
Sign marking the Children's Area

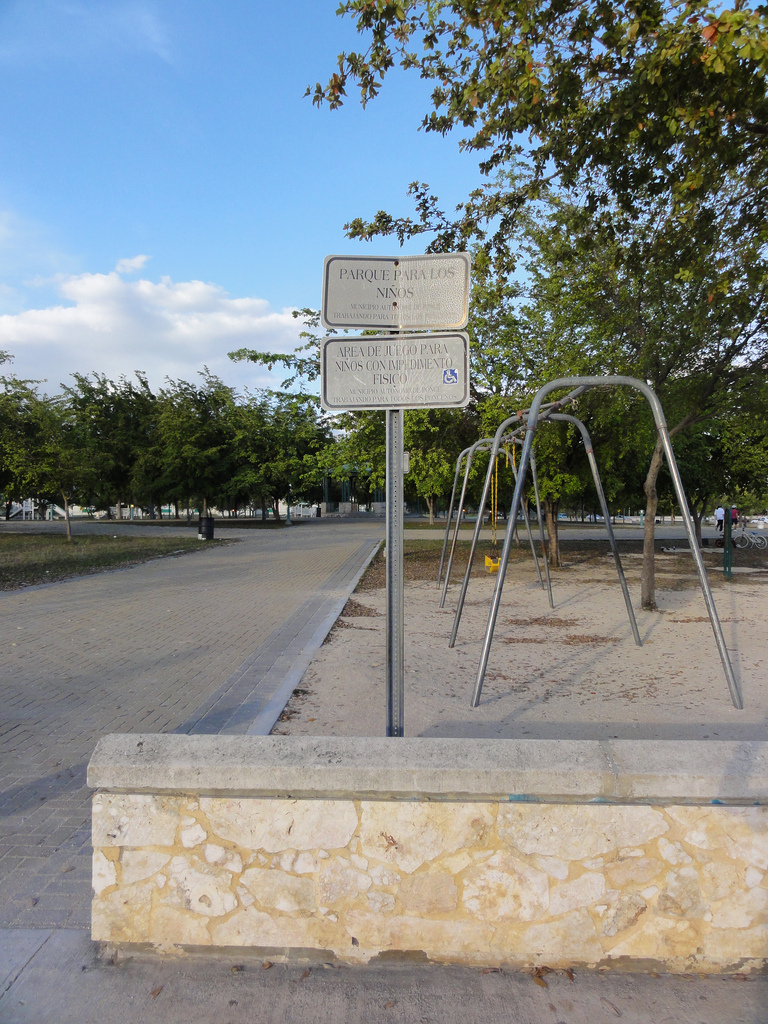
Chamorro-Franceschini Bros. Handicapped Children's Park

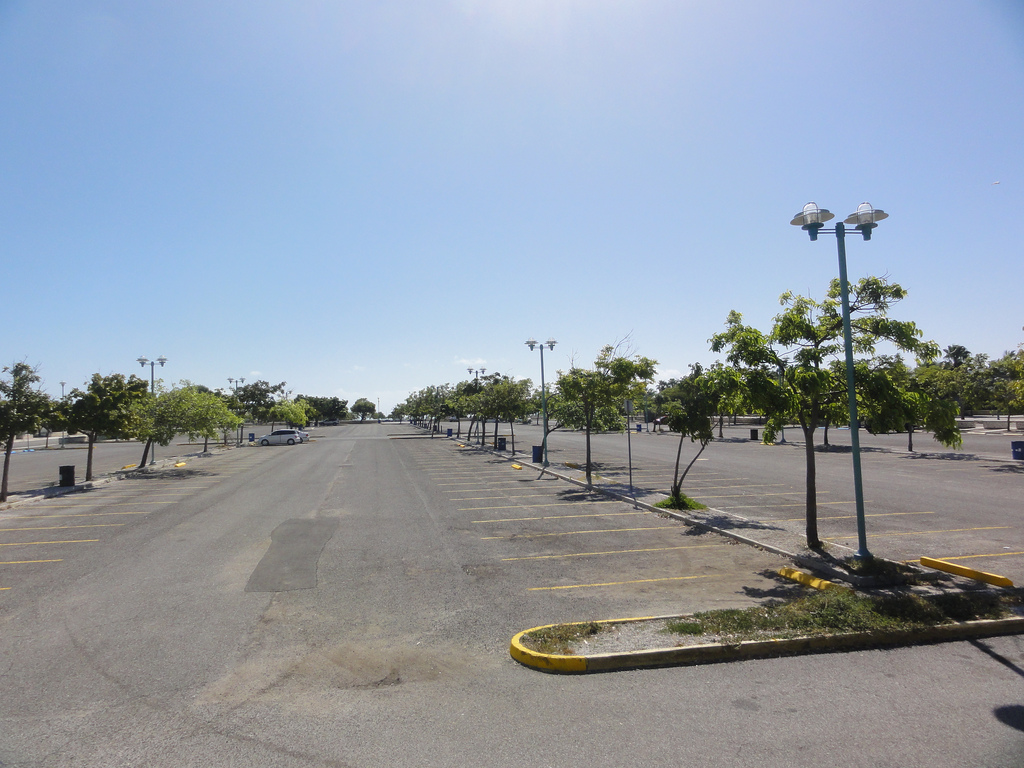
Public parking for over 900 cars at La Guancha

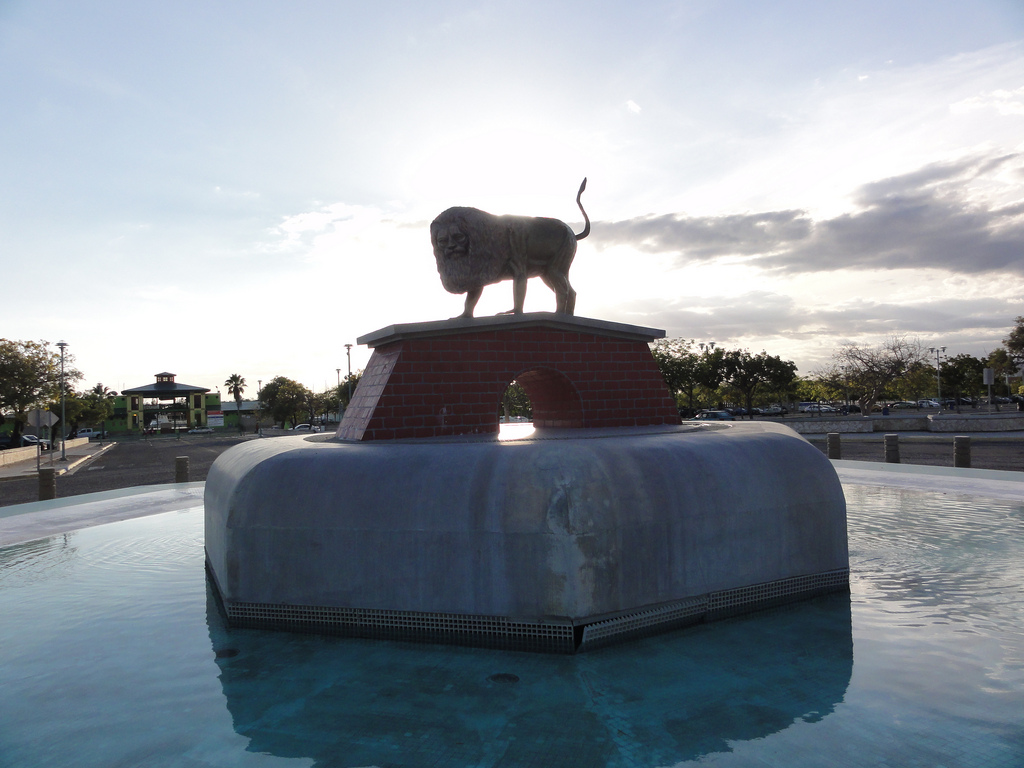
Majestic Fountain and Lion at the Entrance to La Guancha

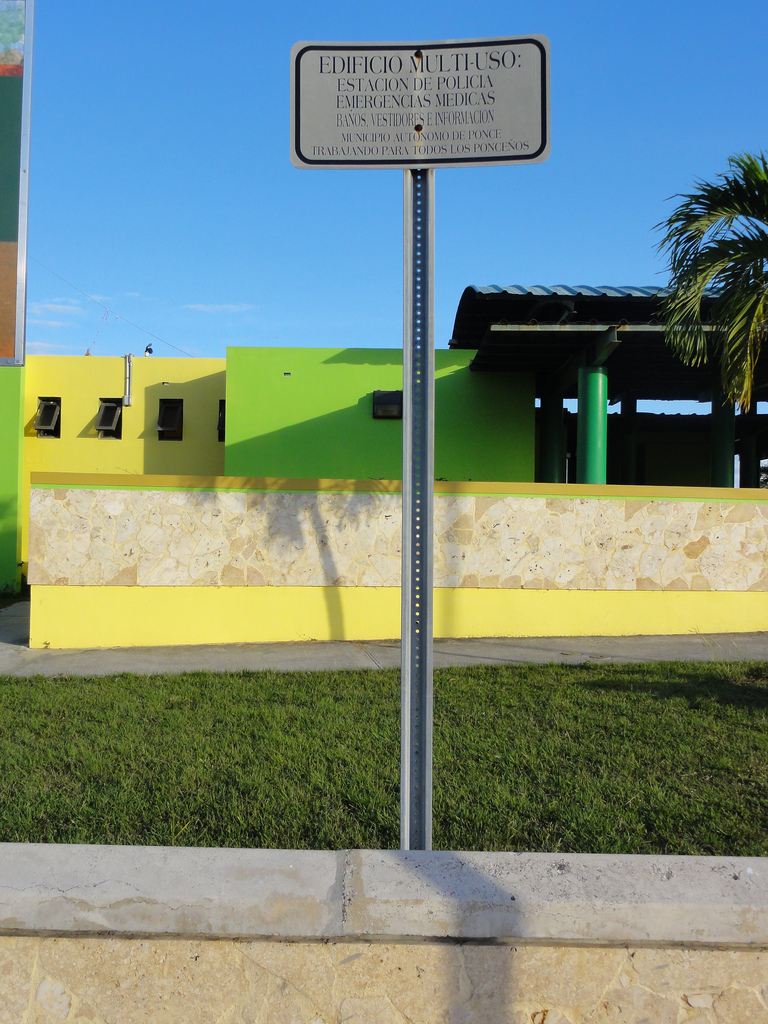
Sign marking the Multiuse Building

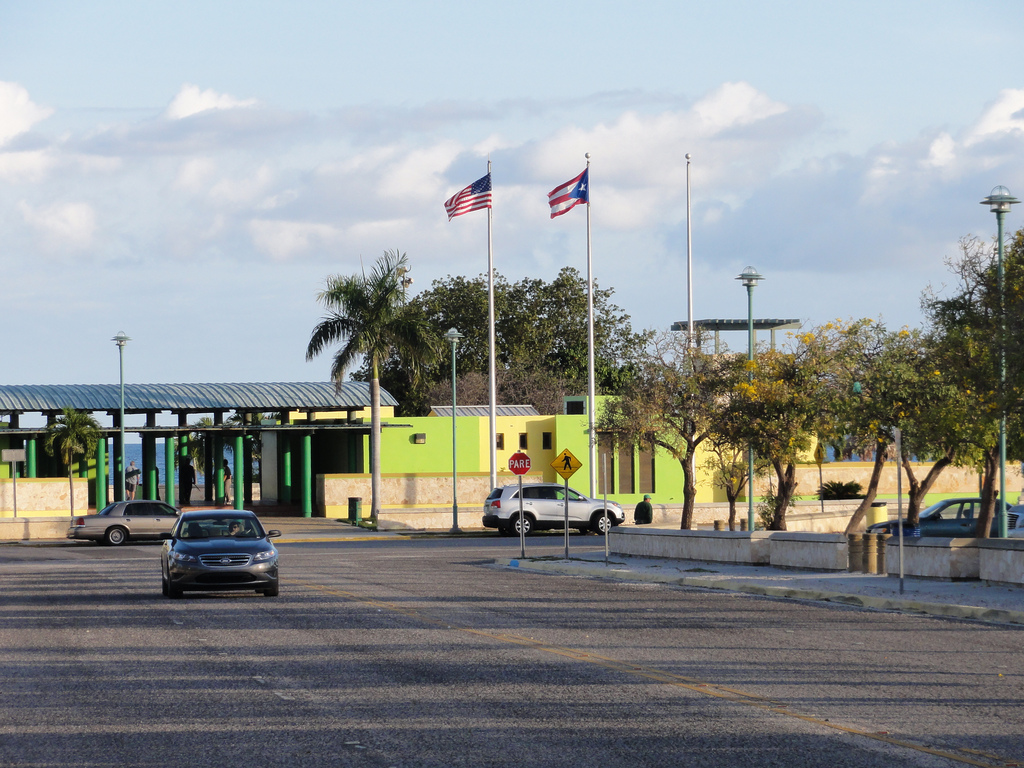
Administrative Multiuse Building

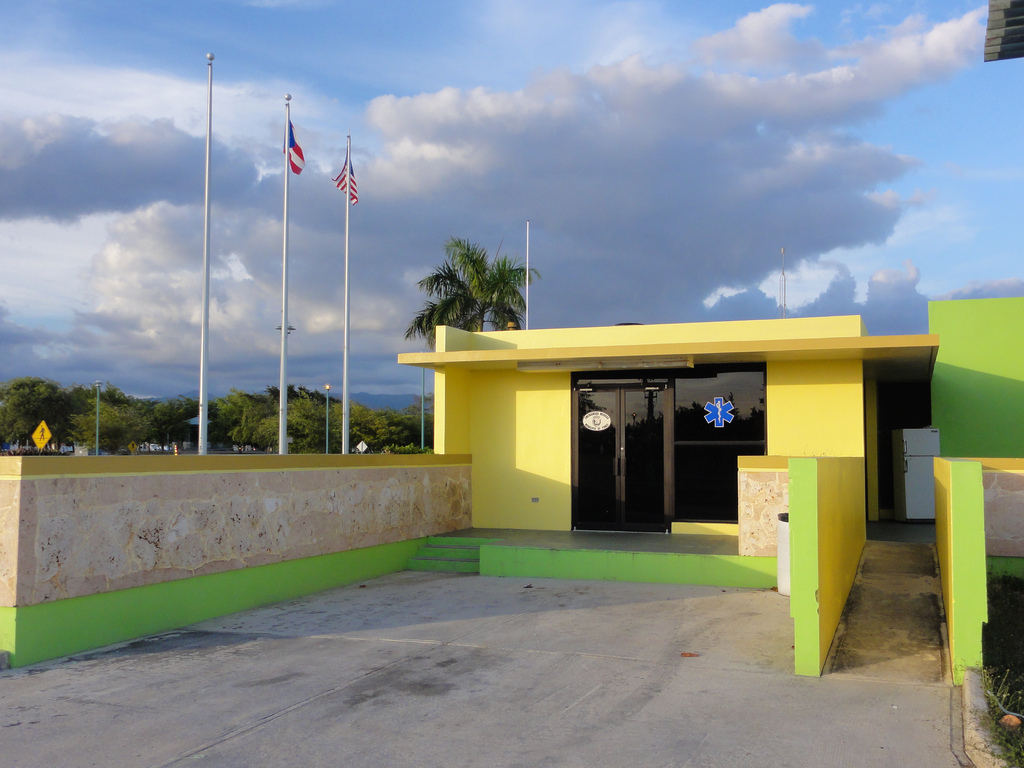
EMS Office at the Multi Use Building

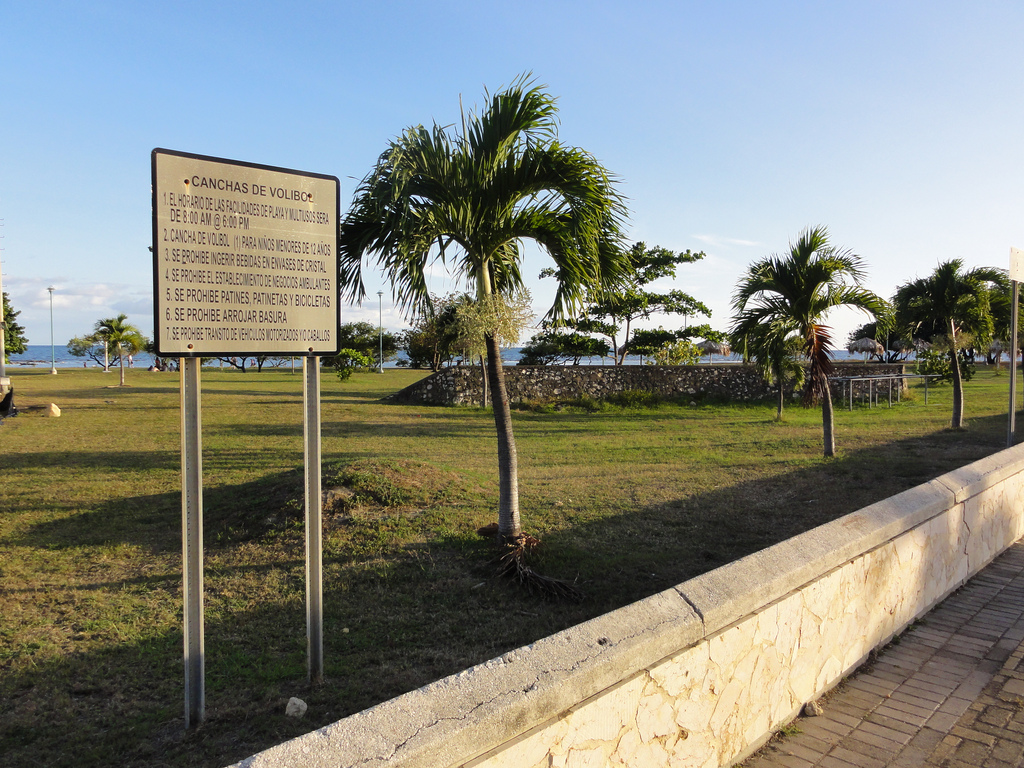
Beach volleyball courts

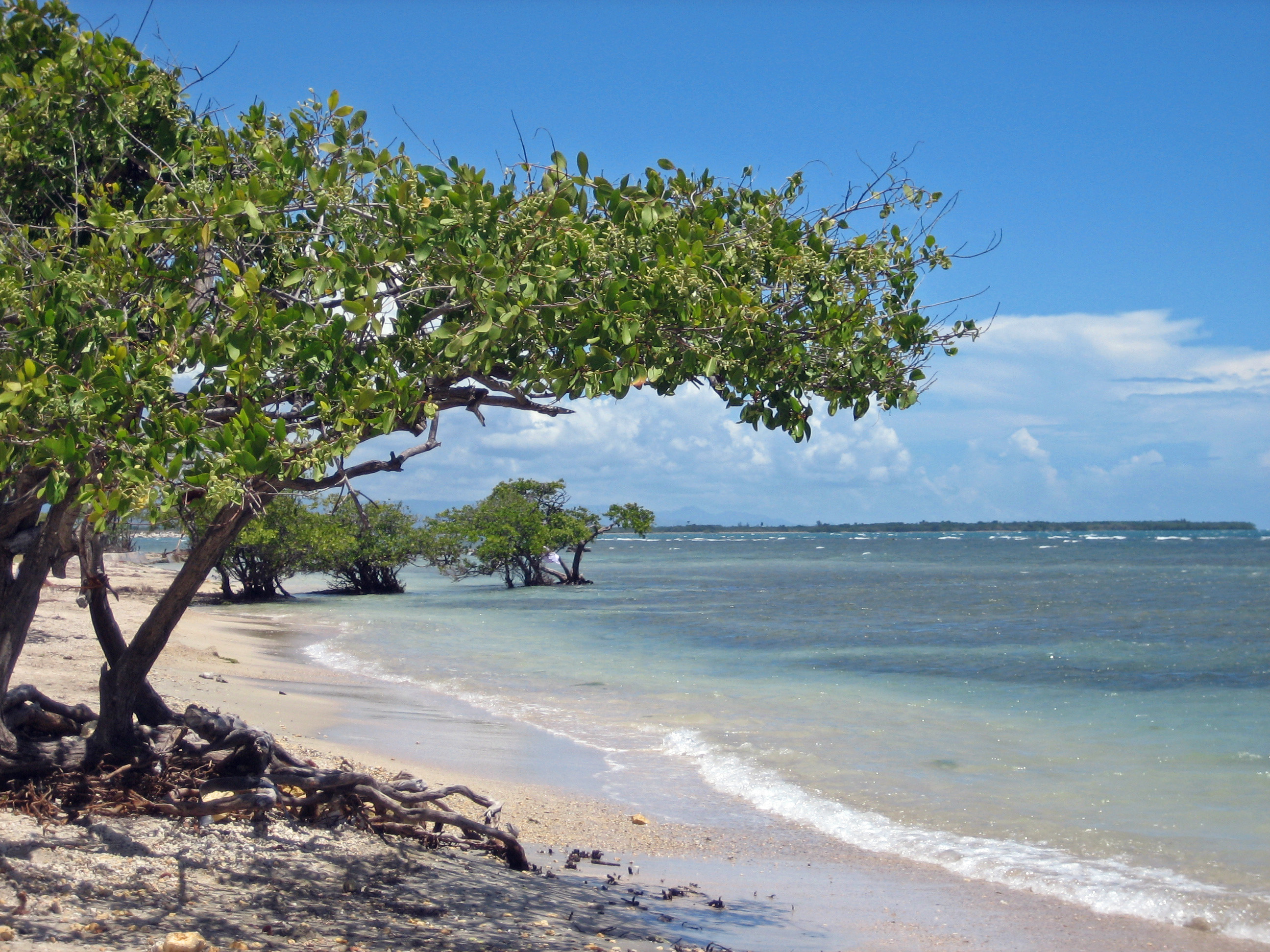
Sand-nourished La Guancha Beach

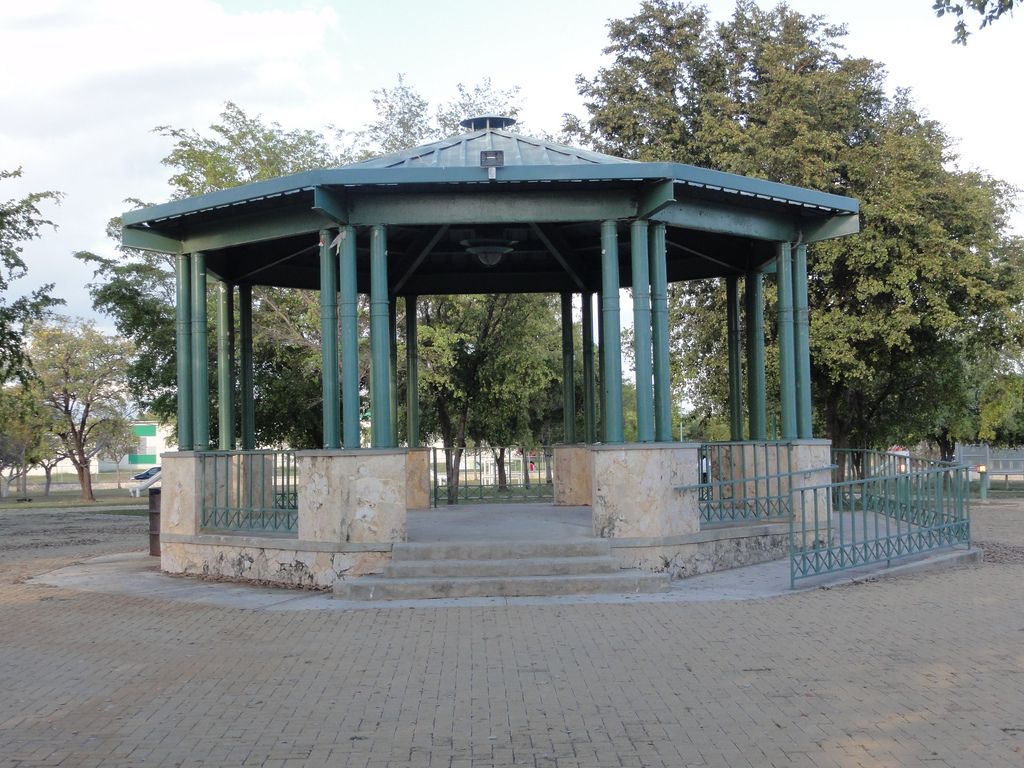
Ponce Municipal Band Gazebo

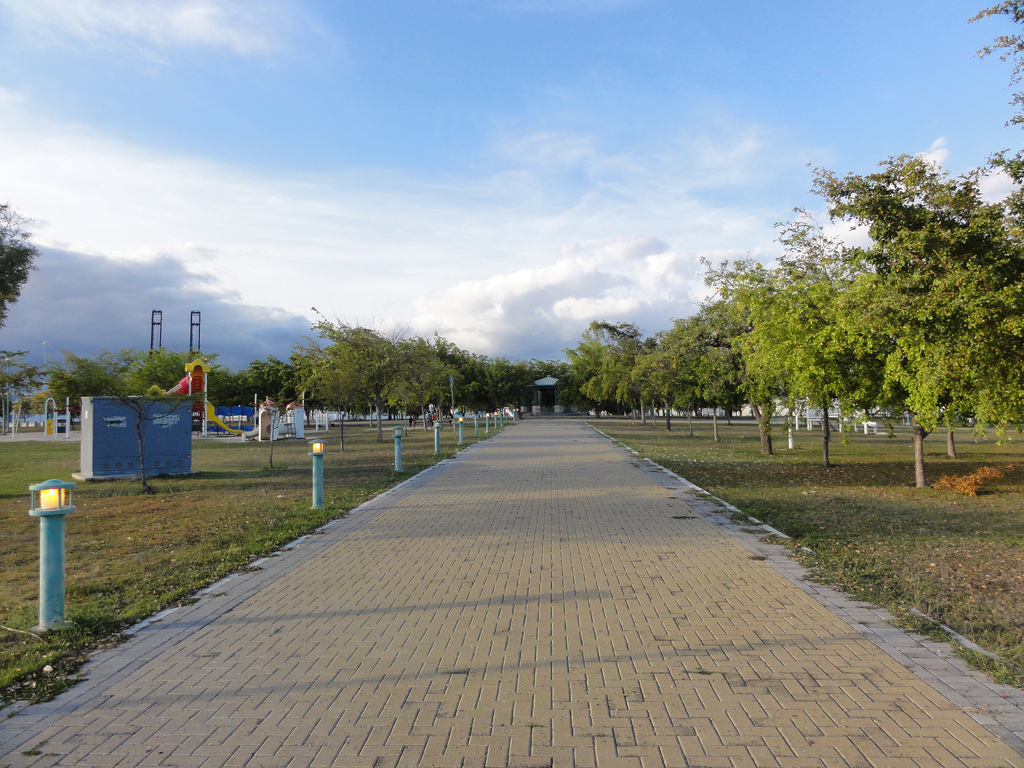
Walkway

== See also ==
- Paseo Tablado La Guancha
