= Centro Ponceño de Autismo =

Organization in Ponce, Puerto Rico

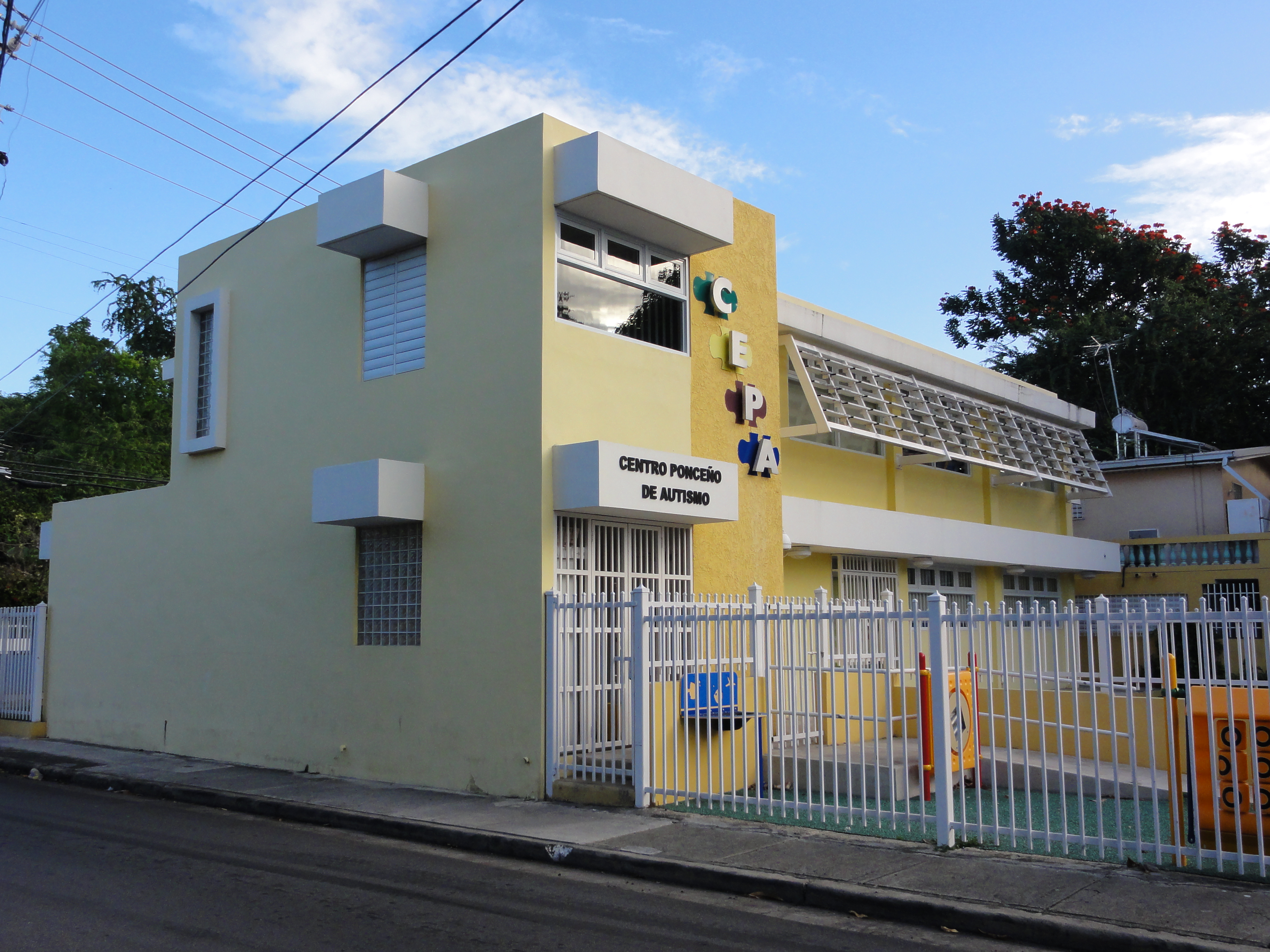
- Centro Ponceño de Autismo in Barrio Segundo
- Abbreviation: CEPA
- Formation: 10 April 2008
- Type: Non-profit NGO
- Legal status: Foundation
- Purpose: Medical, Clinical
- Headquarters: 120 Calle Sol, at Calle Vives, Ponce, Puerto Rico
- Location: Calle Capitán Correa at Calle Vives, Ponce, Puerto Rico
- Coordinates: 18.01284°N 66.61923°W
- Region served: Ponce, southern Puerto Rico, and Puerto Rico at large
- Clinical Director: Laura M. Deliz, Ph.D.
- Executive Director: Maritza Garcia
- President of the Board of Directors: José Pons, M.D.
- Main organ: Corporacion para el Desarrollo del Centro Ponceño de Autismo, C.D.
- Affiliations: Government of the Autonomous Municipality of Ponce
- Budget: $500,000
- Staff: 8
- Website: Centro Ponceño de Autismo
- Remarks: Telephones: (787) 284-2900 (787) 284-2899 (787) 812-1224; Postal Address: P.O. BOX 32267, Ponce, Puerto Rico 00732

The Centro Ponceño de Autismo (English: Ponce Autism Center), or CEPA, is the only center specialized in the diagnosis and treatment of autism in Puerto Rico. It is a non-profit organization. The center leads progressive research studies and medical training while providing comprehensive, personalized care to children and adults with Autism Spectrum Disorders (ASD), including Asperger's Disorder and PDD NOS. Working together with families, the Centro Ponceño de Autismo aims to identify the causes of autism and advance effective treatments. In 2011, it was reported that the Center cared for 179 patients.

== Location ==
The center is centrally located in Ponce, Puerto Rico's second largest city, from where it serves the autism population of southern Puerto Rico. Its location in the Ponce Historic Zone on Calle Sol at N 18.01284 W 66.61923 (18°00'46.224" North, 66°37'9.228" West), in barrio Segundo, a few blocks just northwest of Plaza Las Delicias and the Terminal de Carros Publicos Carlos Garay makes it easily accessible to public transportation.

== History ==
The history of The Centro Ponceño de Autismo dates to 2006 when the parent organization of the Centro Ponceño de Autismo, Corporación para el Desarrollo del Centro Ponceño de Autismo, was founded on 15 March of that year with the intention of forming a center for autism evaluation and treatment in the city of Ponce. In 2007 the organization had already opened a "virtual" center on the Web at MySpace for awareness, support, and interest.

In 2007, the Autonomous Municipality of Ponce made public its intention to formally initiate the first phase of the development of the Autism Center, under the supervision of its First Lady, Mrs. Nancy Colón de Zayas. Mayor Zayas Seijo, while serving in the House of Representatives, in collaboration with former senator Ortiz Dalliot, secured 1.7 million dollars from local government funds for the development of this project in Ponce. Federal funds were obtained through the successful intervention of our governor-elect Hon. Luis Fortuño, as part of his activities in the US congress on behalf of the children of Ponce. Salvador (Chiry) Vasallo and his wife Olga Vasallo donated seven acres in barrio Sabanetas, to house the project in its subsequent phases of development and clinical operation. In 2008 the Center officially opened a brick-and-mortar facility at 120 Sol Street between Vives and Capitan Correa Streets.

== Mission ==
The center's mission is: "To provide individualized assessment, intervention and support services which promote the optimal development of all persons with Autism Spectrum Disorders and other Developmental Disorders."

CEPA is a multidisciplinary center with the mission to serve the Puerto Rican autistic population offering integrated services in the diagnosis and treatment of children in the Autism Spectrum Disorders via a model of intervention centered on the unique needs of each family. It also serves as a center where developing professionals can engage in practicums under the guidance of practicing medical and paramedical professionals who already specialize in fields related to autism with the purpose of preparing more professionals to work with the increasing population of autism cases.

CEPA's mission is to detect at an early stage autism in children and to give them enhanced services to those in the southern part of Puerto Rico, over a condition that has seen a surge in its growth in Puerto Rico and which has been declared a public health crisis. Autismo in Puerto Rico affect 1 of each 91 babies in 2011 compared to 1 in every 150 babies in 2008 when the center was established and compared to 1 of every 2,500 babies in 1998. Services include evaluation and diagnosis, intervention, therapy, counseling to individuals and families and training to professionals, among others. According to its director Dr. Deliz, The center's goals are to achieve an integration of three interventions: the school personnel, the clinician, and the home, and to train professionals in all adjacent professional areas.

She also supports the existence of a public policy on the matter. In addition to evaluation, diagnosis, and psychological intervention for children, parents, and family, other services of the center are psychological, speech and occupational therapies. The center is concerned with the future of those with autism once they become adults.

The center has trained over 500 primary care physicians in Puerto Rico on clinical issues related to the treatment of autism.

During the administration of mayor Francisco Zayas Seijo there were plans for the center to include a clinic, a community center, several school pavilions, transitional residences, an animal farm, and gardens. The architectural rendering of the campus was led by the architectural firm of Roberto Brambilla Associates.

== Funding ==
The center was inaugurated under the municipal administration of mayor Francisco Zayas Seijo in 2008. It operates as a dependency of the Government of the Municipality of Ponce, and receives grants and concessions from the municipality for its operations. CEPA is an independent corporation that receives various municipal grants for its operations. The municipality covers expenses such as utilities, security, and physical plant maintenance, in addition to absorbing the cost of space rental. In 2009 CEPA also received a municipal grant for $40,000 and another one in 2010 for $50,000.

It also received grants from the Government of Puerto Rico. In 2009, the Puerto Rico government granted the Center $100,000 from its general fund. In 2010, the Government of Puerto Rico approved Resolución Conjunta 487 assigning $520,000 to the Municipality of Ponce for operating the center.

== Autism clinical program ==
The Centro Ponceño de Autismo offers an overreaching service model founded on a biophysiosocial model of health based on the stages of humana development. The model defines the development of the person as a result of the integration of biological, psychological and social factor. The different areas of development (physical, social, emotional, cognitive, behavioral, communicational, integration, and sensorial modulation) are attended to in an integrated and functional manner.

The center is characterized by:

- family-centered services, considering that participation of the family is essential as they are the ones closest to the affected child
- interdisciplinary and transdisciplinary services
- individual intervention designed according to the profile of strengths and needs of the child and its family
- the use of various treatment models and strategies supported by scientific evidence
- an emphasis on attending to the needs of the child and his/her family in the least restrictive environment possible
- respect and awareness for the cultural and individual differences of the family and the community
- a commitment to provide accessible and results-oriented quality services

The Autism Clinical Program at the center is a comprehensive assessment and treatment program that provides care supported by the latest research in the field and informed by the clinical expertise of the center's staff. The Clinical Program is the first in Puerto Rico, and one of only a few in the United States, to integrate a research portfolio with clinical care for a community where such services are highly needed. The clinical services team at the Center consists of psychologists, psychiatrists, geneticists, and social workers with specialized training in Autism Spectrum Disorders. The team has expertise working with children who have complex needs and who may be considered difficult to assess and treat elsewhere.

The center has in its staff five specialists that include one of the few pediatric neuropsychologists in Puerto Rico, a speech pathologist who specializes in autism and an occupational therapist.

The center's service model comprises four domains: direct evaluation, diagnosis, intervention, and support services to children and their families, training and professional development, research, and public policy.
