= Enrique "Coco" Vicéns =

Puerto Rican politician and professional basketball player

Personal information
- Born: 3 September 1926 Ciales, Puerto Rico
- Died: 6 March 2015 (aged 88) Ponce, Puerto Rico

Career information
- College: University of Puerto Rico
- Playing career: 1946–1962
- Position: Point guard

Career history
- 1946–1951, 1953, 1957–1958: Leones de Ponce

Enrique A. ("Coco") Vicéns

Member of the Puerto Rico Senate from the at-large district
- In office 1973–1978

Personal details
- Born: 3 September 1926 Ciales, Puerto Rico
- Died: 6 March 2015 (aged 88) Ponce, Puerto Rico
- Party: Popular Democratic Party
- Education: University of Puerto Rico School of Medicine (MD)
- Occupation: Politician
- Profession: Doctor

Military service
- Allegiance: United States of America
- Branch/service: Army National Guard
- Rank: Captain
- Unit: 296th Infantry Regiment
- Battles/wars: Korean War

Enrique "Coco" Alberto Vicéns Sastre (3 September 1926 – 6 March 2015) was a Puerto Rican professional basketball player that also served as senator-at-large in the Puerto Rico State Legislature from 1973 until 1978. He played for the Leones de Ponce basketball team and was also a volleyball player and track and field athlete. His brother was basketball star Juan "Pachín" Vicéns.

== Early years ==
Enrique "Coco" Alberto Vicéns Sastre was born September 3, 1926, in Ciales, Puerto Rico. He was one of 13 siblings. He attended high school at Escuela Superior José de Diego in Manati from 1939 to 1943, graduating that year. Starting in 1943 he attended the University of Puerto Rico. He joined Phi Sigma Alpha fraternity. He graduated as a medical doctor with a specialty in otorhinolaryngology (ENT).

== Sports career ==
From 1943 through 1946, Vicéns played in the Baloncesto Superior Nacional league, winning the national championship in the 1944–45 season. In 1944, and again in 1946, he formed part of Puerto Rico's National Basketball Team competing in Cuba. In 1945, he formed part of the first Puerto Rican college basketball team to play in the United States at Madison Square Garden, Buffalo Memorial Auditorium and Philadelphia Palestra, playing against Valparaiso University, Bowling Green State University and Loyola University. In 1946, Vicéns was also champion in the 800 meter intercollegiate games. He also competed in the 400m and the 4 × 400 m races. He competed in track and field, basketball, and volleyball.

In 1946, Vicéns moved to Ponce where he would have his final home base and residence. By then he had been nicknamed "El Hombre de Goma’’ (the man of rubber) for his performance on the basketball court. In that same year he became a basketball player for the Leones de Ponce, playing until 1951, and again in 1953.

Vicéns Sastre entered the Puerto Rico National Guard and by 1952 he was a captain with the 296th Infantry Regiment at Fort Buchanan, Puerto Rico. The 296th Infantry Regiment got orders to the Korean War. Enrique "Coco" Vicéns received a Bronze Star Medal for his actions in that conflict.

In 1957, he returned to the Leones de Ponce basketball team for the 1957–58 season. From 1959 to 1962 he owned the Ponce Leones team, seeing them into two national victories in the 1960 and 1961 seasons. During 1960, Vicéns was also responsible for the establishment of the first volleyball franchise in Ponce. From 1964 to 1968 he again owned the Leones de Ponce team, seeing them once again into three national victories in 1964, 1965, and 1966. In 1967, the Leones fought for the winner's crown but was ultimately defeated while vying for the top position. As a physician, he was part of the medical staff that accompanied the Puerto Rico Delegation to the 1970 Central American and Caribbean Games.

== Political career ==
In 1972, Vicéns Sastre ran for electoral office winning a seat in the Puerto Rico State Legislature as senator-at-large from 1973 until 1978. There he served as president of the Senate's Comision de Juventud y Deportes (Commission on the Youth and Sports) from 1972 to 1976. Projects developed or completed under Vicens Sastre's watch included Guayama's indoor basketball court, Manati's Baseball stadium, and basketball courts in Canovanas and Fajardo. Vicéns served as a Municipal Legislator in Ponce during 2004–2008.

"Coco" Vicens was a member of the Popular Democratic Party of Puerto Rico, which opposes Puerto Rican statehood and favors a commonwealth status relationship with the United States.

== Last years and death ==
Vicéns Sastre died on March 6, 2015, at 88 years old. He was buried at Las Mercedes Memorial Park in Ponce, Puerto Rico.

== Legacy ==
In 1966 he was selected to the Puerto Rico Basketball Hall of Fame and in 1993 he was included in the Ciales Sports Hall of Fame. His entry into the Ponce Sports Hall of Fame took place in 1983. In the 1990s the "Centro Recreativo y Cultural Enrique Vicéns" was established at the Complejo Recreativo y Cultural La Guancha by the Ponce municipal government under the administration of Ponce Mayor Rafael Cordero Santiago.

== See also ==
- List of Puerto Ricans
- National Superior Basketball
