= Puerto Rico Highway 578 =

Highway in Puerto Rico

Highway 578
- Ruta 578
- Avenida José de Diego
- PR-578 highlighted in red

Route information
- Maintained by Puerto Rico DTPW
- Length: 0.8 km (0.50 mi; 2,600 ft)

Major junctions
- West end: PR-1 in Bucaná–Sabanetas
- East end: Calle Húcar in Vayas–Sabanetas

Location
- Country: United States
- Territory: Puerto Rico
- Municipalities: Ponce

Highway system
- Roads in Puerto Rico; List
← PR-577	→ PR-585

Puerto Rico Highway 578 (PR-578) is tertiary state highway in Ponce, Puerto Rico. The road runs from east to west, parallel to PR-1, and it forms the boundary between the northern end of barrio Bucaná and the southern end of barrio Sabanetas. The road is located entirely within the municipality of Ponce.

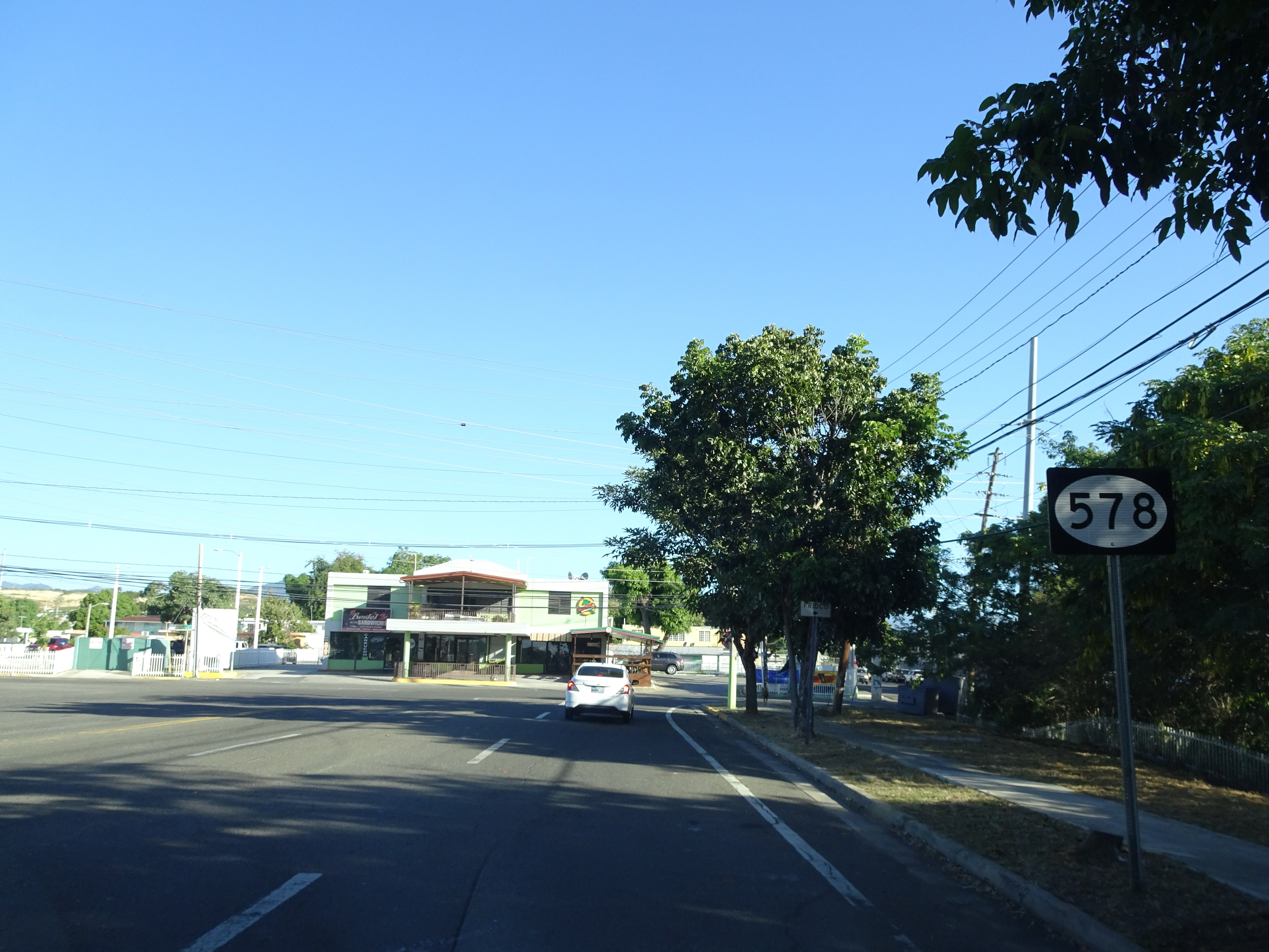
Entering Puerto Rico Highway 578 in Sabanetas

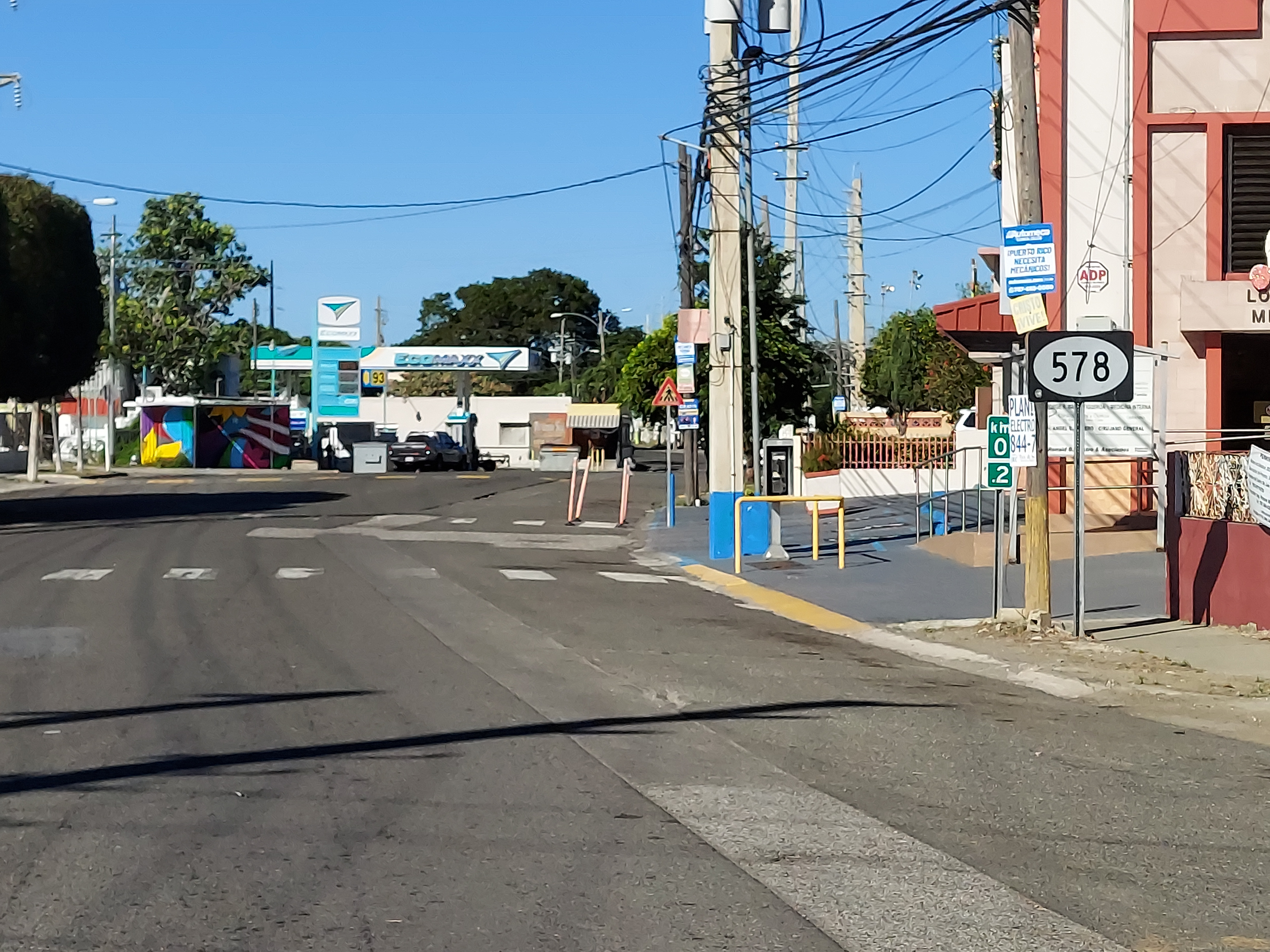
Puerto Rico Highway 578 west in Sabanetas

== Major intersections ==
The entire route is located in Ponce.

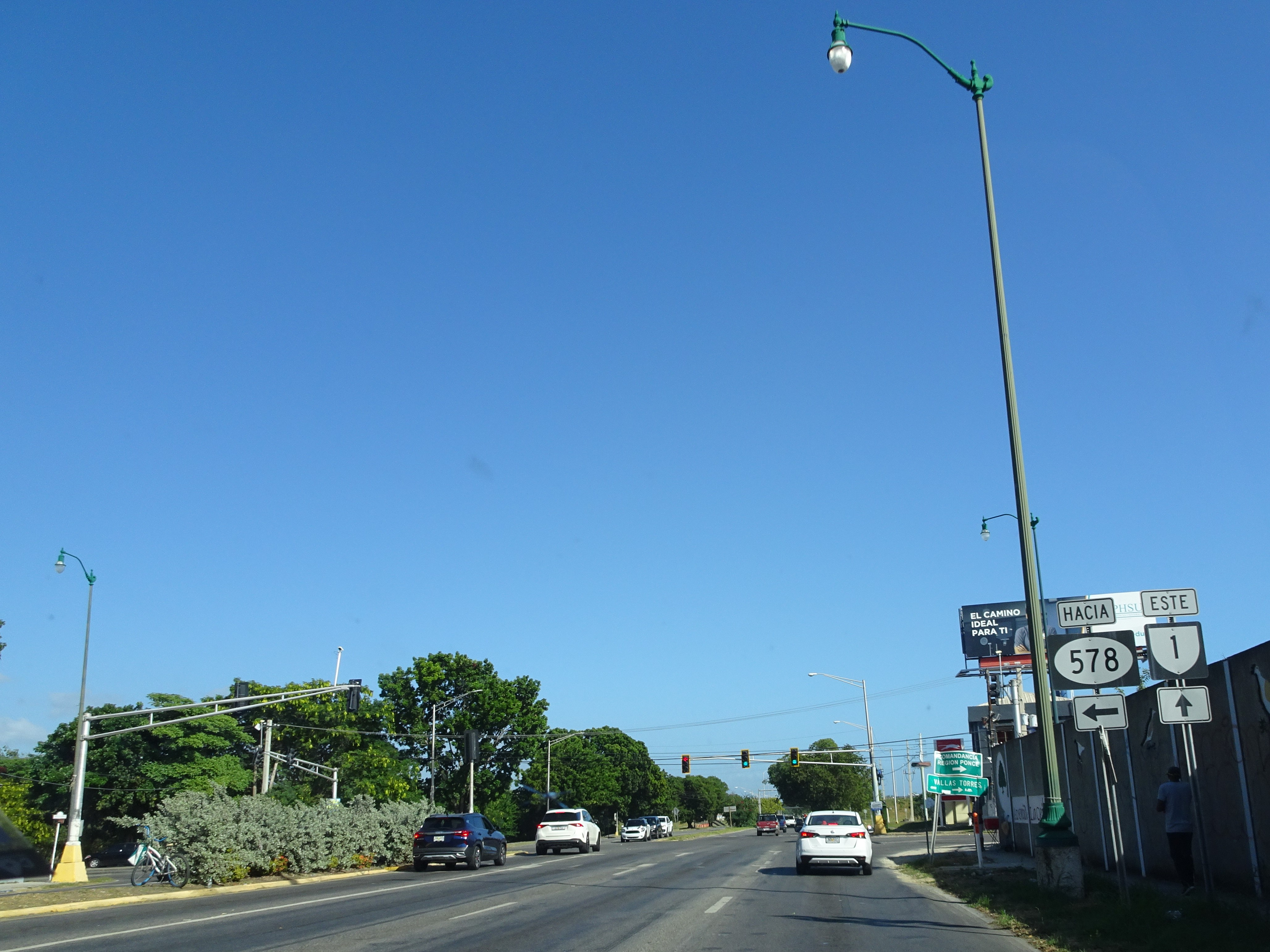
PR-1 east at its junction with PR-578

Location	km	mi	Destinations	Notes
Bucaná–Sabanetas line	0.8	0.50	PR-1 west (Avenida La Ceiba) – Ponce	Western terminus of PR-578; no access to PR-1 eastbound; no access from PR-1
Sabanetas–Bucaná– Vayas tripoint	0.1– 0.0	0.062– 0.0	To PR-1 (Avenida La Ceiba) / PR-Avenida Los Caobos – Ponce, San Juan	
Vayas–Sabanetas line	0.0	0.0	PR-Calle Húcar – Ponce	Eastern terminus of PR-578
1.000 mi = 1.609 km; 1.000 km = 0.621 mi: Incomplete access

== See also ==
- List of highways in Ponce, Puerto Rico
- José de Diego
