= Delis Castillo Rivera de Santiago =

Puerto Rican politician

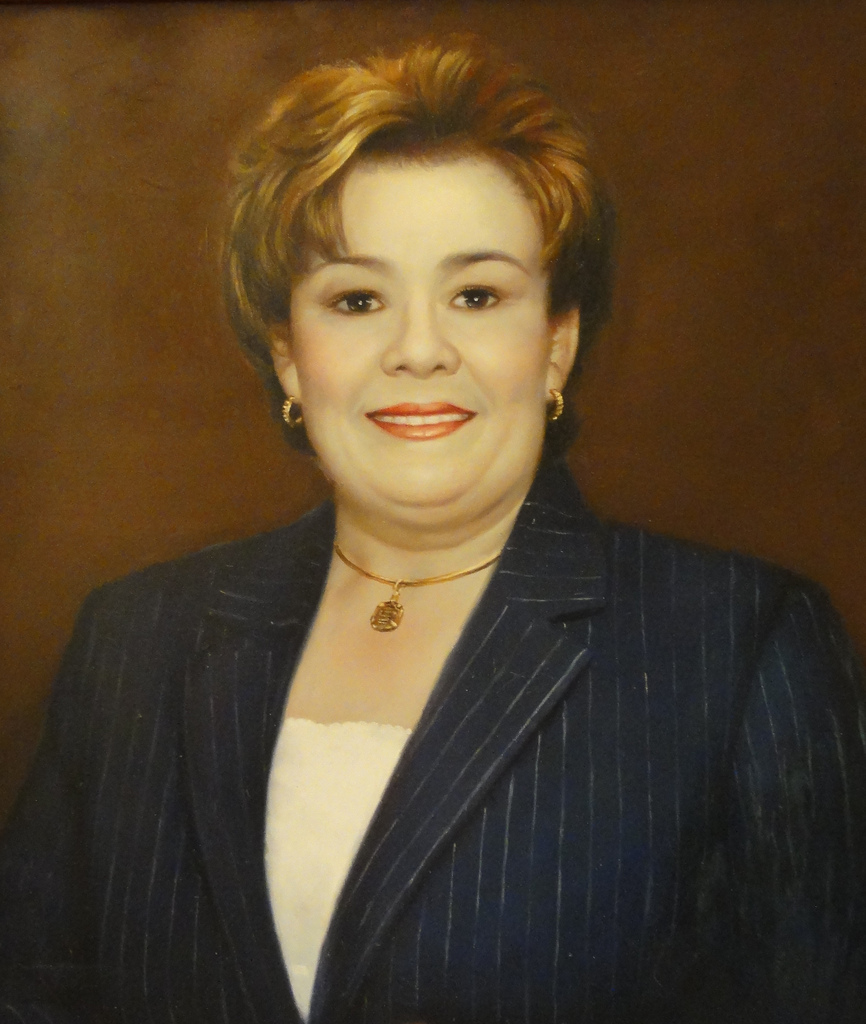
- Mayor Delis Castillo Rivera de Santiago

133rd Mayor of Ponce, Puerto Rico
- In office 17 January 2004 – 9 January 2005
- Preceded by: Rafael Cordero Santiago
- Succeeded by: Francisco Zayas Seijo

Personal details
- Born: ca. 1945
- Party: Popular Democratic Party
- Profession: Politician

Delis Castillo Rivera de Santiago (born ca. 1945) was interim mayor of Ponce from 2004 to 2005. She filled the post left vacant by the sudden death of long-time Mayor Rafael Cordero Santiago, completing Mayor Cordero Santiago's term. Prior to filling in the office of mayor, Castillo Rivera was vice-mayor of the municipality. She is a member of Mu Alpha Phi sorority.

== See also ==
- List of mayors of Ponce, Puerto Rico

Political offices
Preceded by Rafael Cordero Santiago	Mayor of Ponce, Puerto Rico; 17 January 2004 – 9 January 2005	Succeeded by Francisco Zayas Seijo
