= Bucaná, Ponce =

Barrio of Ponce, Puerto Rico

Bucaná
- Barrio
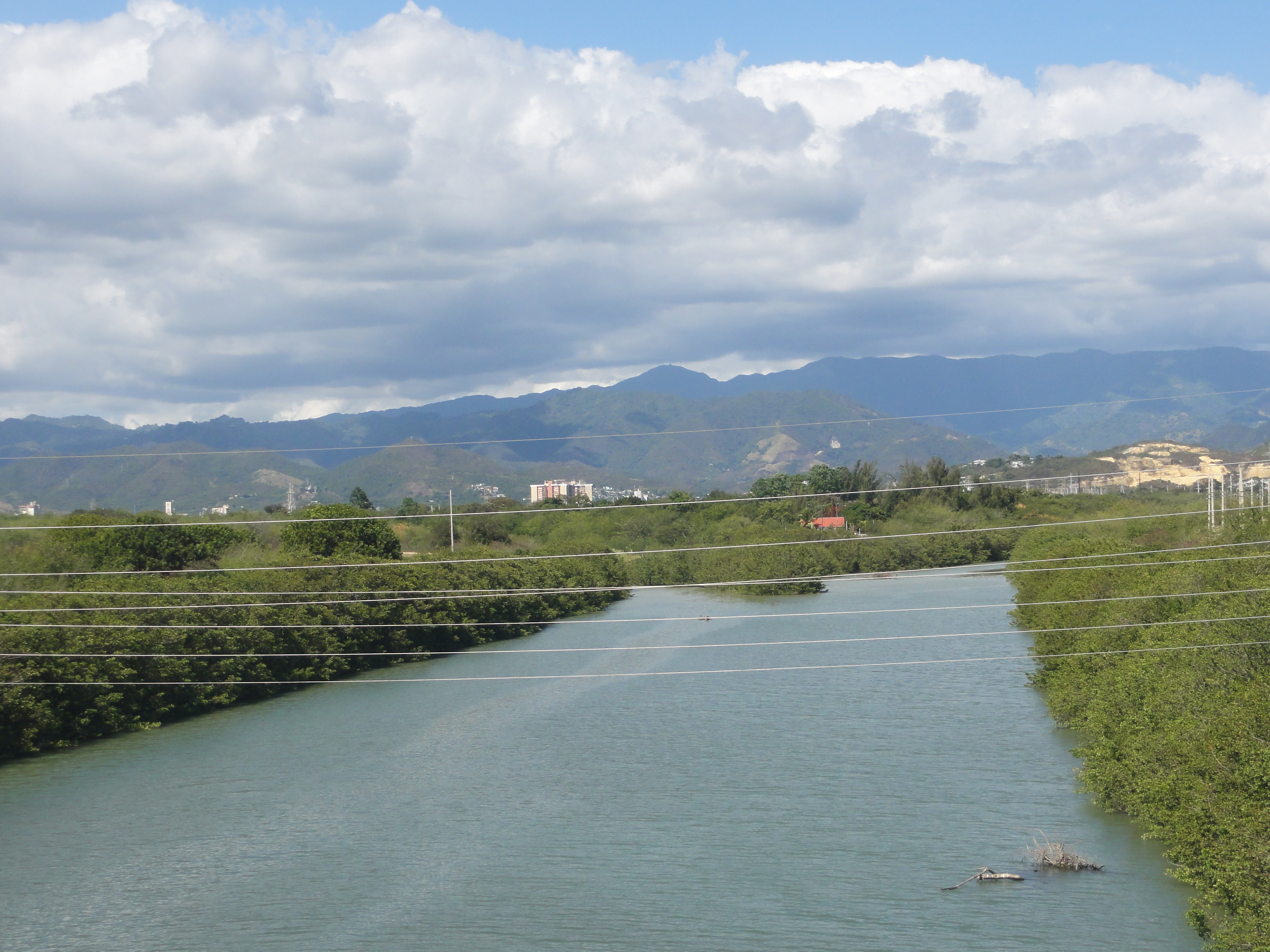
- Río Portugués (L) feeds into Río Bucaná (R), just north of PR-52 in Barrio Bucaná

- Location of barrio Bucaná within the municipality of Ponce shown in red

- Location of Puerto Rico
- Coordinates: 17°58′51″N 66°35′41″W
- Commonwealth: Puerto Rico
- Municipality: Ponce

Area
  - Total: 2.16 sq mi (5.6 km^{2})
  - Land: 1.37 sq mi (3.5 km^{2})
  - Water: 0.79 sq mi (2.0 km^{2})
- Elevation: 0 ft (0 m)

Population (2010)
  - Total: 3,630
  - Density: 2,669.1/sq mi (1,030.5/km^{2})
- Source: 2010 Census
- Time zone: UTC−4 (AST)

Bucaná is one of the 31 barrios of the municipality of Ponce, Puerto Rico. Together with Canas, Playa, Vayas, and Capitanejo, Bucaná is one of the municipality's five coastal barrios. The name of this barrio is of native Indian origin. It was founded in 1831.

== History ==
Prior to being established as a barrio of Ponce, around 1597, the bay of Ponce had a small place populated by Christian European settlers that was called Bucaná. In 1800, Bucaná was known as Coto Bucaná, a type of grant of land suitable for farming to a resident by the Spanish king in recognition for some service provided by the resident to the King.

== Location ==
Bucaná is an urban barrio located in the southern section of the municipality, within the Ponce city limits, and southeast of the traditional center of the city, Plaza Las Delicias. The toponymy, or origin of the name, alludes to the river that makes its way through it, Río Bucaná.

== Boundaries ==
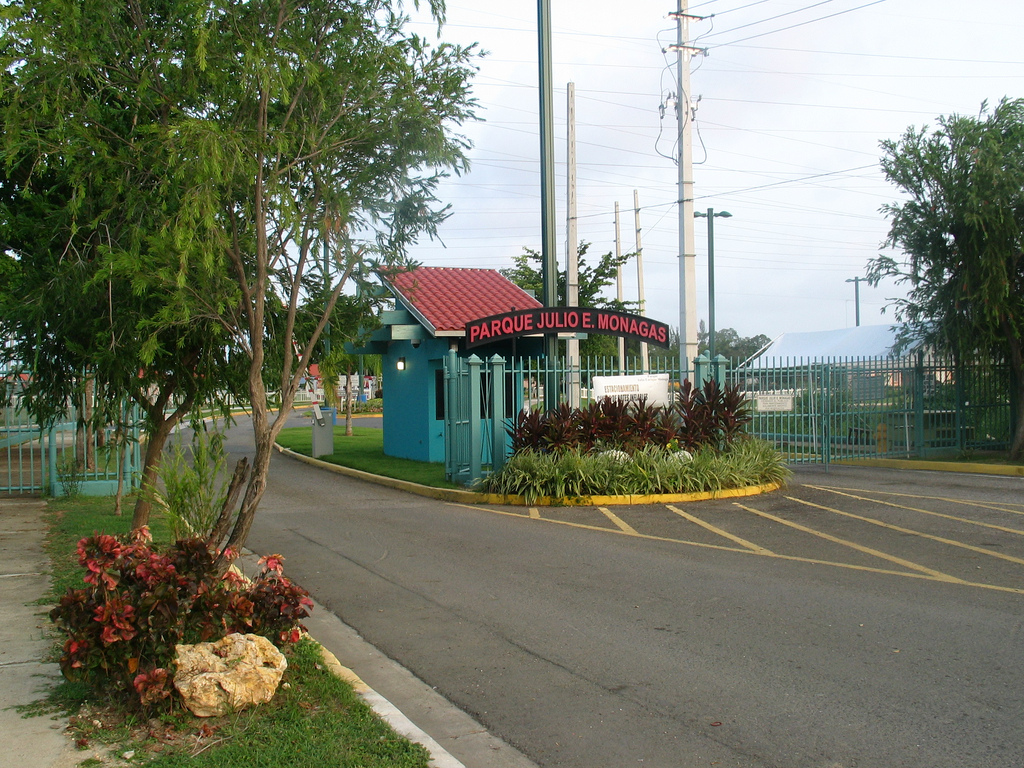
Entrance to Julio Monagas Park in Barrio Bucana.

It is bounded on the North by Marginal Street/PR-578 (one block north of PR-1), on the South by the Caribbean Sea, on the West by Rio Bucana, PR-2 (roughly), Rio Portugues, and the Portugues-Bucana Rivers Channel, and on the East by Bucara Street/Los Caobos Avenue, PR-52 (roughly), and the Costa Caribe Country Club East Access Road.

In terms of barrio-to-barrio boundaries, Bucaná is bounded in the North by Sabanetas, in the South by the Caribbean Sea, in the West by San Anton and Playa, and in the East by Vayas.

== Demographics ==
Historical population
Census	Pop.	Note	%±
1910	603		—
1920	512		−15.1%
1930	901		76.0%
1940	695		−22.9%
1950	887		27.6%
1960	841		−5.2%
1970	547		−35.0%
1980	4,179		664.0%
1990	4,053		−3.0%
2000	3,963		−2.2%
2010	3,630		−8.4%
U.S. Decennial Census; 1899 (shown as 1900) 1910-1930; 1930-1950 1960 1970 1980-2000 2010

Bucaná has 1.34 square miles (3.5 km^{2}) of land area and 0.81 square miles (2.1 km^{2}) of water area. In 2000, the population of Bucaná was 3,963 persons, with a density of 2,958 persons per square mile. In 2010, the population of Bucaná was 3,630 persons, with a density of 2,669.10 persons per square mile. It has the shortest coastline of all five of Ponce's coastal barrios.

The communities of Los Caobos and Camino del Sur are found in Bucana.

Major roads in barrio Bucana are PR-1, PR-578 and PR-52.

== Landmarks ==
Barrio Bucaná is home to the Julio Enrique Monagas Family Park.

== See also ==
- List of communities in Puerto Rico
