= María Meléndez =

Puerto Rican politician

Mayita Meléndez
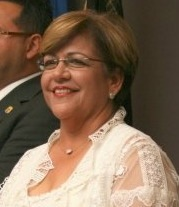

Shadow Member of the U.S. House of Representatives from Puerto Rico
- In office July 1, 2021 – July 17, 2023
- Preceded by: Pedro Rosselló (2019)
- Succeeded by: Vacant

Chair of the Puerto Rico Democratic Party
- Acting
- In office January 20, 2017 – February 7, 2017
- Preceded by: Roberto Prats
- Succeeded by: Charlie Rodríguez

135th Mayor of Ponce
- In office January 12, 2009 – January 10, 2021
- Preceded by: Francisco Zayas Seijo
- Succeeded by: Luis Irizarry Pabón

Personal details
- Born: María Eloisa Meléndez Altieri; December 26, 1951 (age 74) Bayamón, Puerto Rico
- Party: New Progressive
- Other political affiliations: Democratic
- Spouse: Rafael Mateu Cintrón (divorced)
- Children: 2
- Education: University of Puerto Rico, Río Piedras (BS); University of Puerto Rico School of Dental Medicine (DMD)

María Eloisa Meléndez Altieri (born 26 December 1951) also known as Mayita, is a Puerto Rican politician who served as the mayor of the city of Ponce, Puerto Rico, from 2009 to 2021. Meléndez Altieri was elected during the Puerto Rican general elections of 2008, becoming the first woman elected to the office in Ponce's political history. She was also the first mayor of a party other than the Popular Democratic Party in Ponce since 1989, when Rafael Cordero Santiago became mayor. This is Mayita's second candidacy in politics on the island and her first electoral win. In the Puerto Rico's 2004 general election, Mayita presented her candidacy for a senatorial seat representing Puerto Rico's 5th district, but lost in her bid for the position. Meléndez Altieri lost her bid for reelection in the 2020 general elections to Luis Irizarry Pabon from the Popular Democratic Party.

== Biography ==
Meléndez Altieri was born in Bayamón, Puerto Rico. (Note: Some sources, such as the Puerto Rico Chamber of Commerce, state she was born in Rio Piedras, Puerto Rico. See here.) (Note: Some sources, such as WAPA-TV, state she was born in Bayamon, Puerto Rico. See here)

She was the daughter of Eloísa Altieri Brau and José Luis Meléndez Mena. Meléndez studied secondary education in the city of Bayamón. She obtained her high school diploma at Colegio Santa Rosa in 1969 with high honors. Meléndez studied at the UPRRP College of Natural Sciences where she earned a bachelor of science degree in 1973. After graduating with a degree in dental medicine from the University of Puerto Rico School of Dental Medicine, she worked as a dental assistant until she established her own dental practice in Ponce.

== Works ==
Under her administration, construction of the $4.5 million Parque Ecológico Urbano (English: Urban Ecological Park) was started and completed. She called the construction of the park one of the five "signature" projects of her administration.

Another signature project of her administration was the Sistema Integrado de Transportación del Sur (SITRAS) (English: Southern Integrated Transportation System).

In all, Melendez Altieri identified five signature projects of her administration:

1. ) Acueducto Municipal del Norte (Northern Municipal Zone Aqueduct) at a cost of $5 million
2. ) Sistema Integrado de Transportación del Sur (SITRAS) mass transit, at $1.66 million the initial phase
3. ) Parque Ecológico Urbano, at an investment of $4.5 million
4. ) Ciudad Deportiva at an initial cost of $4.5 million
5. ) The restoration of the Juan Bigas Building (old Plaza del Mercado) to convert it into "Ponce Servicios" at an undisclosed amount of money

The entire penta-project effort went under the name "Ponce Avanza" and the permanent structures have an assignment of $177 million.

Acueducto del Norte envisions bringing round-the-clock drinking water to the residents of the northern mountainous sections of the municipality. It is expected to serve communities from the easternmost community of Hogares Seguros in the northeastern Barrio of Anón to the northwestern community of Santas Pascuas in the northernmost part of Barrio Guaraguao just south of the border with Adjuntas, and from the southern community of Paraíso in Barrio Machuelo Arriba, to the municipal boundaries with Adjuntas, Utuado and Jayuya. It includes a new water purification plant in the Burenes sector of Barrio Tibes, that would be using water from Río Portugués and Río Inabón in Ponce, and from Río Jauca in the Adjuntas/Jayuya area, and will also use water from four other water purification plants on Guaraguao, Burenes (Tibes), Hogares Seguros (Anón), and Real Anón (Anón).

== Family ==
She was married to Rafael Arturo Mateu Cintrón. She has two daughters, Ana Margarita Mateu Melendez and Maria del Mar Mateu Melendez. Each of her two daughters are officially titled "The First Lady of Ponce".

== Notes ==
Political offices
Preceded by Francisco Zayas Seijo	Mayor of Ponce; 2009–2021	Succeeded by Luis Irizarry Pabón
Party political offices
Preceded by Roberto Prats	Chair of the Puerto Rico Democratic Party; Acting; 2017	Succeeded by Charlie Rodríguez
U.S. House of Representatives
Vacant Title last held by Pedro Rosselló; 2019	Shadow Member of the U.S. House of Representatives from Puerto Rico; 2021–2023	Vacant
