= Rafael Cordero Santiago =

Puerto Rican politician

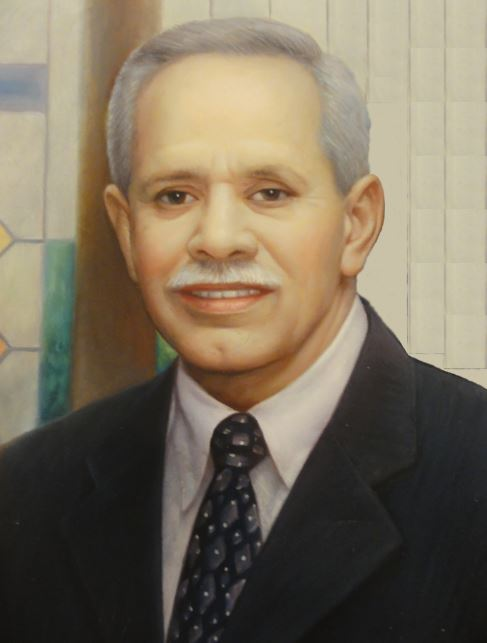
- Mayor Rafael Cordero Santiago

132nd Mayor of Ponce, Puerto Rico
- In office 2 January 1989 – 17 January 2004 (died in office)
- Preceded by: Iván Ayala Cádiz
- Succeeded by: Delis Castillo

Personal details
- Born: 24 October 1942 Ponce, Puerto Rico
- Died: 17 January 2004 (aged 61) San Juan, Puerto Rico
- Party: Popular Democratic Party (PPD)
- Spouse: Madeleine Velasco-Alvarado
- Children: Solange Marie Cordero-Velasco, Mara Bianca Cordero-Velasco
- Education: Pontifical Catholic University of Puerto Rico (BA)
- Profession: Politician

Rafael Cordero Santiago (24 October 1942 – 17 January 2004), better known as "Churumba", was the Mayor of Ponce, Puerto Rico, from 1989 to 2004. Many considered him as a synonym of Ponce, being baptized as "El León Mayor" (Spanish for "The Greatest Lion"), an allusion to the city's official symbol, the lion. Mayor Cordero was a firm believer in the government decentralization process.

During Cordero Santiago's term in the Ponce mayoral office, the city saw the construction of the Julio Enrique Monagas Family Park, the Tricentennial Park Plaza, and the La Guancha Boardwalk. In 1991, he established an initiative for a restoration project for the 25 de Enero Street historical area, and in 1990 he launched the conversion of the old Parque de Bombas into a museum. Also in 1990, he facilitated the establishment of Castillo Serralles as a museum led by a civic, nongovernmental organization.

Cordero Santiago is credited with re-establishing the "Ponce en Marcha" project in 1992, and there are some who also credit him with the passage by the Puerto Rico Legislature of the Autonomous Municipalities Act of 1991. One of his projects under Ponce en Marcha was the restoration of the Ponce Casino, as depicted on the plaque at the northern exterior wall of the restored casino building on Calle Marina and Calle Luna.

== Early years ==
Cordero was born in Barrio Playa in Ponce, Puerto Rico, to Don Bernardino Cordero-Bernard and Doña María de los Santos Santiago. While still a young boy, his family moved to Calle Lolita Tizol in the Ponce Historic Zone. He attended public schools in Ponce: Ramiro Colon and Rafael Pujals elementary schools, McKinley middle school, and Ponce High School. He graduated from the Pontifical Catholic University of Puerto Rico in 1964 with a bachelor's degree in Arts with a concentration in Political Sciences, Economy, and Social Sciences. While a university student, Cordero was a member of the Nu Sigma Beta fraternity Delta chapter. As a child he was nicknamed "Churaumba", a nickname he carried into adulthood. "Churumba" was a nickname given in reference to Cordero's height; it is a Puerto Rican Spanish name given to small spinning tops. The name probably derived from the Andalusian Spanish term "churumbel", used to describe a small child.

Cordero was involved in Puerto Rican politics since 1969, when he began working as a special aide to former Governor of Puerto Rico Rafael Hernández Colón, then president of the Puerto Rico Senate. A member of the Popular Democratic Party (PPD), Cordero went on to work in the Departments of Finance and Workers' Rights (Spanish: Departamento del Derecho al Trabajo).

== Mayor of Ponce ==
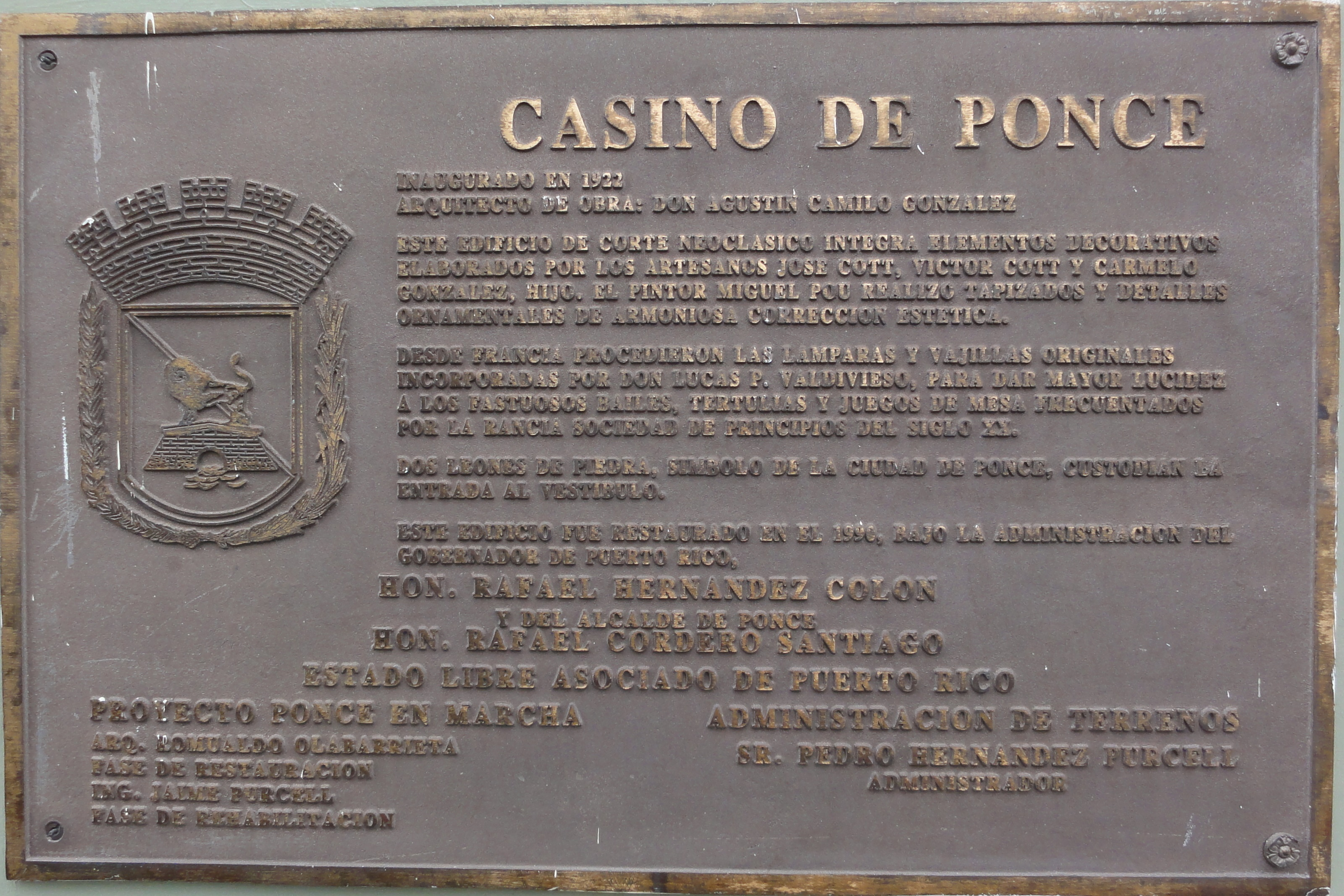
Plaque honoring Mayor Cordero Santiago for the restoration of Casino de Ponce, under the project "Ponce en Marcha".

In 1988, Cordero received the endorsement of then governor Rafael Hernández Colón for the office of Mayor of the city of Ponce and won the elections for the PPD by 1,617 votes against his opponent Helcías Bermúdez of the New Progressive Party that same year. He won re-elections in 1992, 1996, and 2000.

Among Cordero Santiago's many achievements as mayor are the construction of the Julio Enrique Monagas Family Park, the largest family park in Puerto Rico. The park, which opened in 1994 and was named to honor the founder of the Puerto Rico Olympic Committee, covers some 80 acres (320,000 m^{2}) and is located at the confluence of the Bucaná and Portugues rivers. Cordero Santiago also built the Tricentennial Park Plaza in 1992, the La Guancha Boardwalk, and is credited with re-establishing the "Ponce en Marcha" project in 1992. In 1991, mayor Cordero Santiago instituted a restoration project for the 25 de Enero Street homes, the street per se, and surrounding area based on their historical value. In 1990, the administration of Cordero Santiago restored the old Parque de Bombas and turned it into a museum that preserves the history of Ponce's firefighters. On Cordero's credit list is also facilitating the establishment of Castillo Serralles as a museum in 1990. There are some who also credit him with the establishment of the Autonomous Municipalities Act of 1991. He was also instrumental in the celebration of the 1993 XVII Central American and Caribbean Games held in Ponce.

In late 2003, Cordero signed and initiated the construction of a multimillion-dollar mega port complex in Ponce named Port of the Americas, a project he fought for during several years. The project is expected to generate much needed jobs for Ponce residents, and improve the local Mercedita Airport and the Ponce hotel industry. Upon his death in 2004, the project was still in construction. On 28 June 2004, via Law 166, the Legislature of Puerto Rico renamed the Port of the Americas as the 'Rafael "Churumba" Cordero Santiago Port of the Americas', in his honor.

Churumba is widely regarded as author of a saying that is still used today:

Ponce es Ponce, y lo demas es parking. (English: Ponce is Ponce, and the rest is parking.)

— Rafael Cordero Santiago

A strong believer in the removal of the U.S. Navy from the Puerto Rican island of Vieques, Cordero was arrested in 2001 and imprisoned for 30 days after practicing civil disobedience during the Navy-Vieques protests by illegally trespassing the restricted grounds of the United States Navy on Vieques.

== Death and funeral ==
Rafael Cordero Santiago's grave, at Panteon Nacional Roman Baldorioty de Castro in Ponce, PR

Churumba died on 17 January 2004 at 9:00 AM AST in the Medical Center of Río Piedras at the age of 61 after slipping into a coma and suffering a brain hemorrhage. His wish of posthumously donating his organs was fulfilled.

The funeral guard was held on 18 January in the Juan Pachín Vicéns Auditorium with a rotatory guard of politicians, public servicemen and the various sport teams of Ponce. Many visitors cheered "Long live Churumba!" and "We love you!" The electronic board of the auditorium displayed the words "The Greatest Lion rests in peace".

Churumba's coffin was later returned to a local funeral home for a family veil guard. The day after, on Monday, 19 January, a prayer was offered at the Catedral de Nuestra Señora de Guadalupe after exposing the mortal remains in the former mayor's home. Cordero's burial was held in the La Piedad Cemetery in Ponce. Former Governor Rafael Hernández Colón and his brother were in charge of the oratory mourning.

His remains were subsequently transferred to the Panteon Nacional Roman Baldorioty de Castro near downtown Ponce, where they are currently located in a prominent mausoleum.

== Personal life ==
Cordero was married to Madeleine Velasco Alvarado. They had two daughters, fraternal twin sisters Solange Marie and Mara Bianca.

== Homages ==
After game seven of the Puerto Rico National Basketball League 2004 Finals, when the Ponce Lions won their twelfth championship, player Antonio Colón lifted Cordero's usual courtside seat igniting Ponce fans into celebration. The championship was officially dedicated to Cordero. Cordero's seat was reserved open during every Ponce Lions home game in 2004, in his honor.

== Honors ==
On 13 August 2008, the Puerto Rico Legislative Assembly approved Law 256, naming Route PR-9, a controlled access highway which circles the city of Ponce, as the Rafael (Churumba) Cordero Santiago Highway. Cordero Santiago is also honored at Ponce's Park of Illustrious Ponce Citizens. Only six other, of over 100 former Ponce mayors, are honored there. In Barrio Playa, his homebarrio, there is thoroughfare near Plaza del Caribe, named after him; a large image of his face stands at the beginning of the thoroughfare. The Port of Ponce was also renamed after him; it is now called the Rafael Cordero Santiago Port of the Americas.

== Quotes ==
Ponce is Ponce, and the rest is parking.

— Rafael 'Churumba' Cordero

This phrase has become a common catchphrase among ponceños, who are usually regarded for the pride they show for the city. "This [phrase] is in reference to the massive traffic jams experienced in the San Juan metropolitan area where highways resemble parking lots certain times of the day." Cordero's widow, Madeleine Velasco, used the phrase at the closing of her late husband's funeral in his honor.

== Other references ==
1. Santana, Mario. Sublime muestra de agradecimiento. San Juan, Puerto Rico: El Nuevo Día. 19 January 2004.
2. El Nuevo Dia. Muere 'Churumba' Cordero. San Juan, Puerto Rico. 17 January 2004.

== See also ==
- List of Puerto Ricans

Political offices
Preceded by Iván Ayala Cádiz	Mayor of Ponce, Puerto Rico; 2 January 1989 – 17 January 2004	Succeeded by Delis Castillo
