= List of parks in Ponce, Puerto Rico =

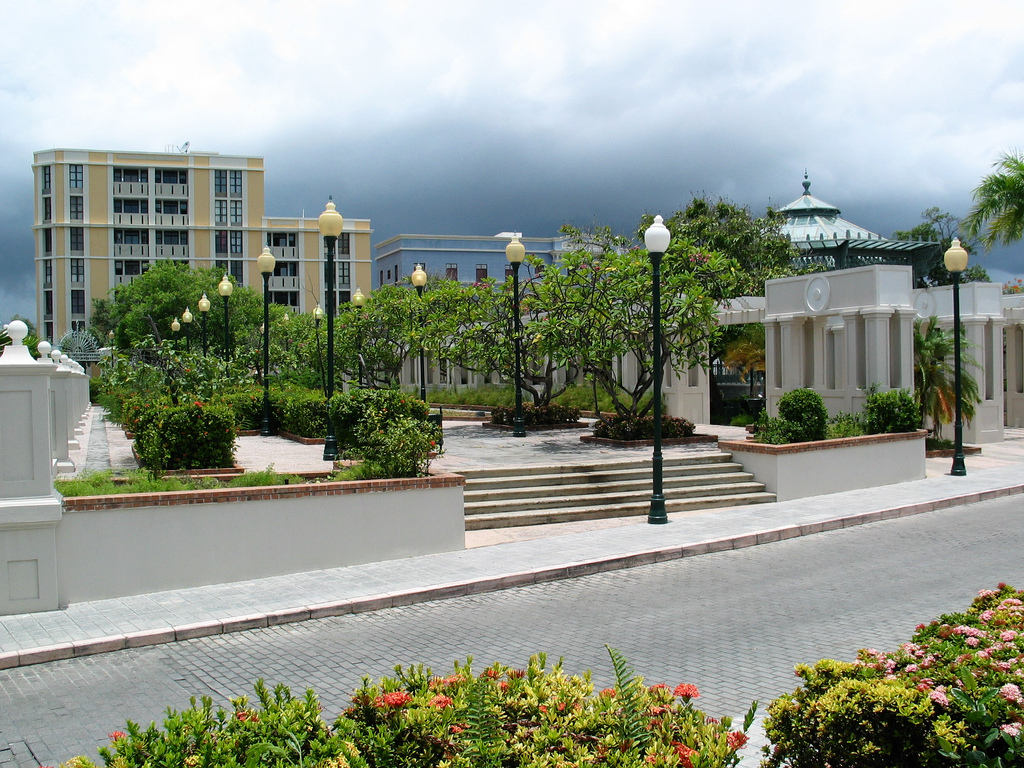
Dora Colon Clavell Urban Park in Barrio Primero

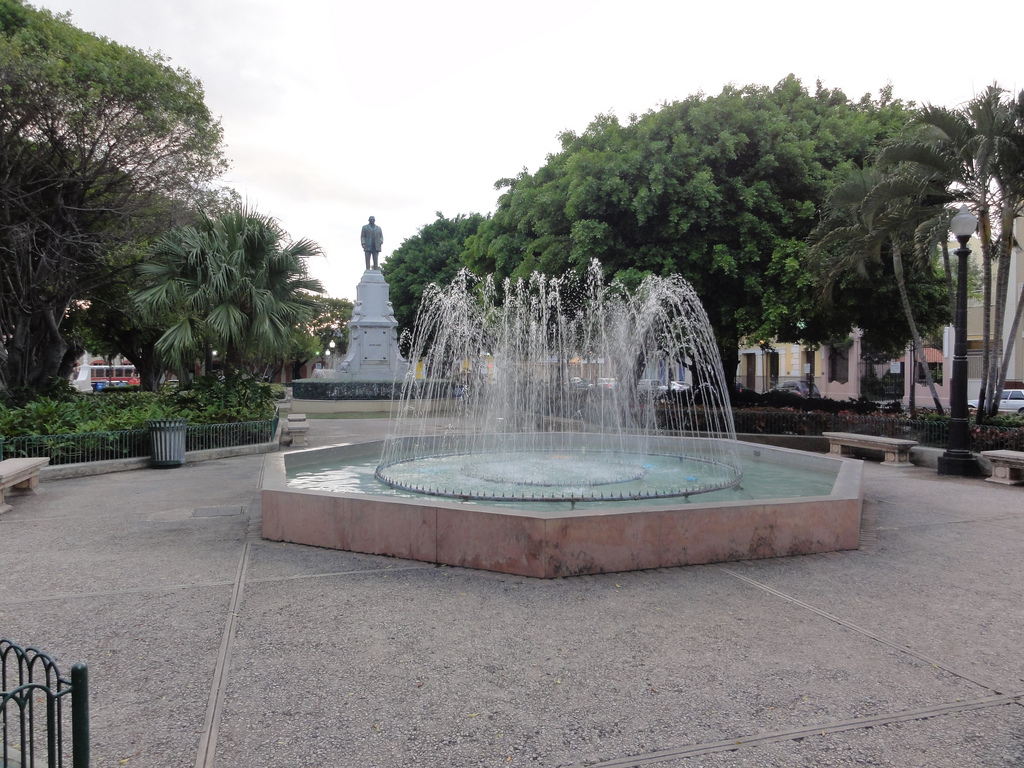
Fountain at Plaza Muñoz Rivera

This list of parks in Ponce, Puerto Rico, consists of the parks in the municipality of Ponce, Puerto Rico. Passive as well as active parks are included; but recreational-use only parks, such as baseball stadiums, are omitted. Public parks maintained by both the municipal government as well as the central island government are listed.

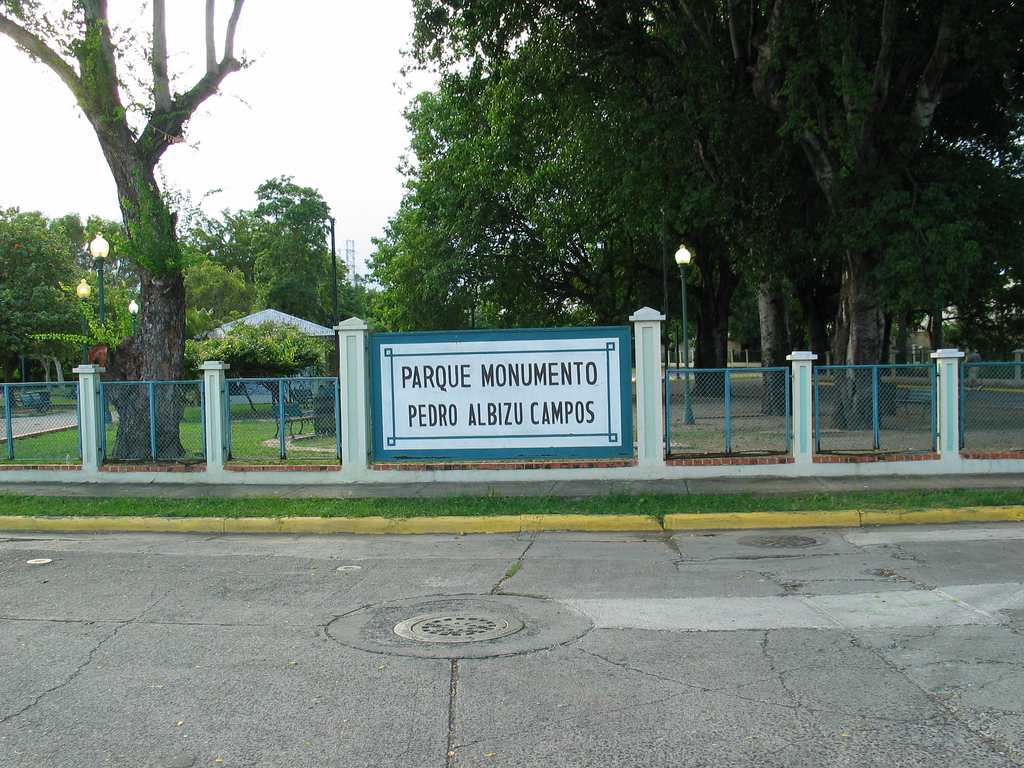
Entrance to Parque Pedro Albizu Campos in Barrio Machuelo Abajo

== Park list summary table ==
No.	Name	Sponsorship	Ownership	Type	Area (acres)
1	Parque de la Abolición	Public	Municipal	Passive	unk
2	Parque de la Ceiba	Public	Municipal	Passive	0.6
3	Parque del Retiro	Public	Municipal	Passive	4
4	Parque del Tricentenario	Public	Municipal	Passive	unk
5	Parque Ecológico Urbano	Public	Municipal	Passive	6
6	Parque Familiar Julio Enrique Monagas	Public	Municipal	Active & Passive	125
7	Parque Lineal Veredas del Labrador	Public	Municipal	Active & Passive	12.7 (km)
8	Parque Luis A. Wito Morales	Public	State	Active & Passive	200
9	Parque Pedro Albizu Campos	Public	Municipal	Passive	unk
10	Parque Urbano Dora Colón Clavell	Public	Municipal	Passive	4
11	Plaza Degetau	Public	Municipal	Passive	1.2
12	Plaza Las Delicias	Public	Municipal	Passive	2.2
13	Plaza Muñoz Rivera	Public	Municipal	Passive	1.0
14	Parque Agüeybaná	Public	Municipal	Passive	unk
15	Parque Graciela Rivera	Public	Municipal	Passive	unk
16	Complejo Recreativo y Cultural La Guancha	Public	Municipal	Active & Passive	20
