= Puente de los Leones =

Historic bridge in Ponce, Puerto Rico

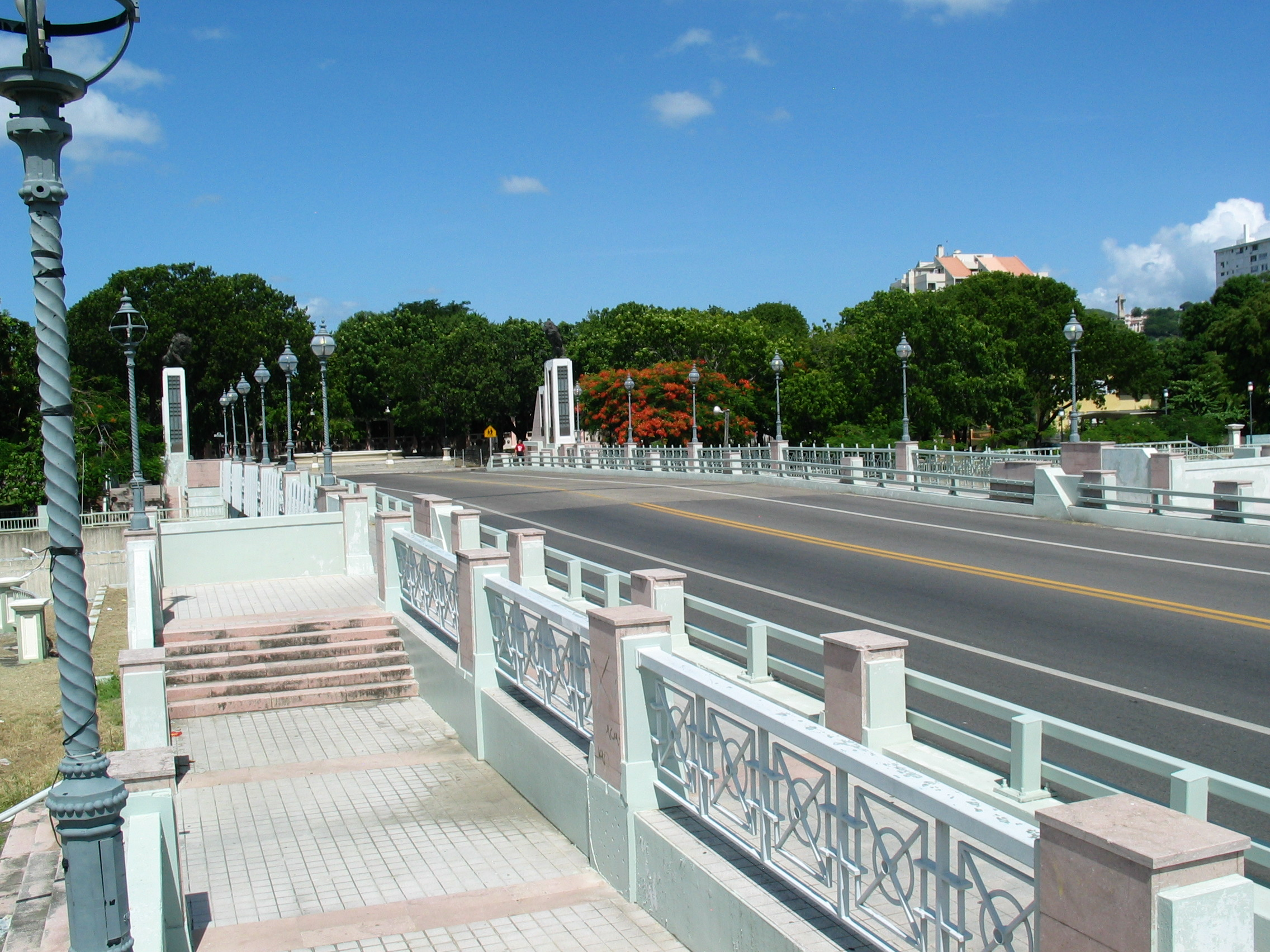
- Puente de los Leones, looking west from Barrio San Antón towards Barrio Tercero
- Coordinates: 18°00′45″N 66°36′27″W
- Carries: Vehicular and Pedestrian traffic
- Crosses: Río Portugués
- Locale: Ponce, Puerto Rico
- Other name(s): Puente Blas Silva (1950-1990); Puente Reina Isabel (1990)
- Named for: City feline symbol
- Owner: Ponce Municipal Government
- Maintained by: Ponce Dept of Public Works
- Preceded by: Puente Blas Silva (1900-1950)

Characteristics
- Design: Art Deco
- Total length: 93.5 feet (28.5 m)
- Width: 60 feet
- No. of spans: 1
- Load limit: 44.2 metric tons
- Clearance above: Open
- No. of lanes: 4

History
- Architect: Sanchez Arana Arquitectos
- Designer: Ilia Sanchez Arana
- Engineering design by: Nelson Hidalgo
- Constructed by: Unitech Engineering; Hector I. Ocasio; R. Ortiz Carro
- Fabrication by: Grupo Ingenieril Constructora Santiago; Jose A. Lopez Madrazo
- Construction start: 1901
- Construction end: 1902
- Opened: 1900; 125 years ago
- Inaugurated: 1902
- Rebuilt: 1990
- Replaces: Puente Blas Silva

Statistics
- Daily traffic: 19,400 (Year 2005)
- Toll: No

The Puente de los Leones (literally, Bridge of the Lions) is a historic bridge in Ponce, Puerto Rico, joining Barrio Tercero to Barrio San Antón and Barrio Machuelo Abajo. It is also the city's best known bridge. The bridge is at the western terminus of Bulevar Miguel Pou, the main gateway to the Ponce Historic Zone. The Art Deco bridge carries four lanes of vehicular traffic from the two-way Miguel Pou Boulevard. It crosses Río Portugués connecting Barrio Tercero to the west with Barrios Machuelo Abajo and San Anton to the east. It is located 0.5 km east of Plaza Las Delicias.

== History ==
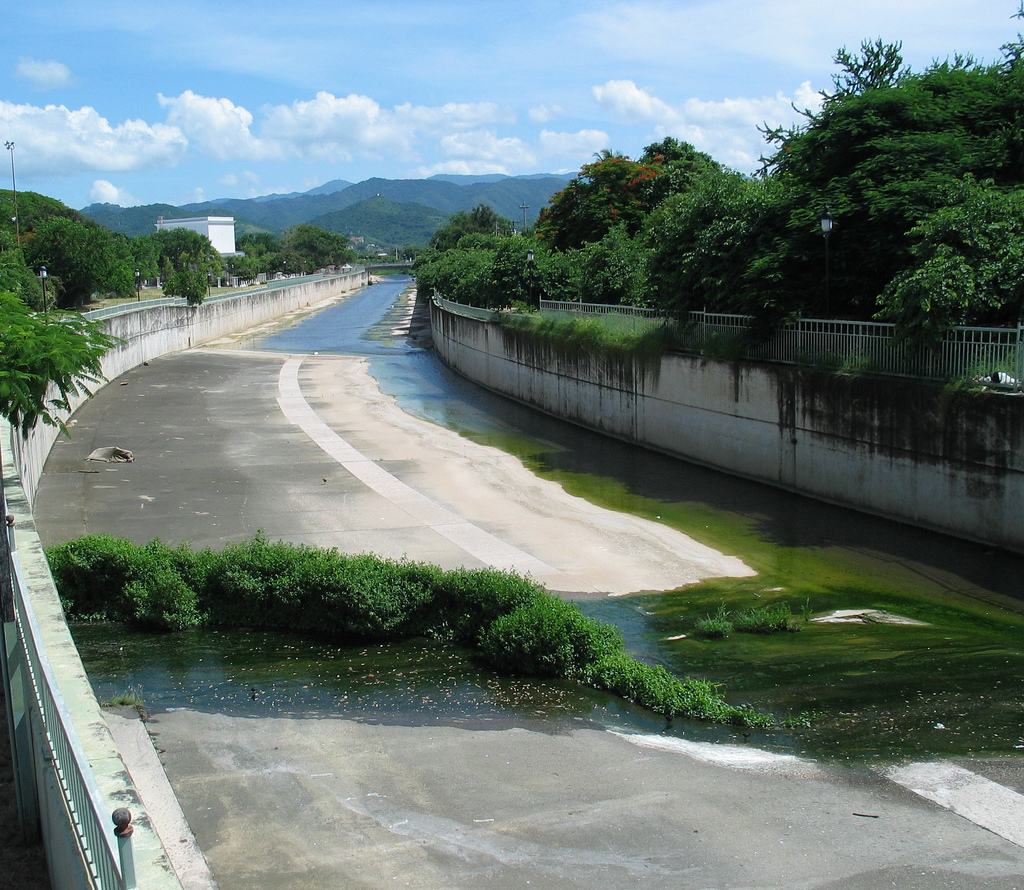
View of the channelized Río Portugués, looking north from Puente de Los Leones.

An 1818 map (Note: According to Eduardo Questell Rodriguez in his "Historia de la Comunidad Bélgica de Ponce: a partir de la Hacienda Muñiz y Otros datos" (Ponce, Puerto Rico: Mariana Editores. 2018. p.12; ISBN 978-1-935892-04-5), the map itself was drawn by former Ponce mayor Alejandro Ordóñez.) of the city of Ponce recorded by historian Eduardo Neumann Gandia shows that the site currently occupied by Puente de los Leones was a regular cross-way over Rio Portugués between the eastern flatlands and the village of Ponce to the west. The first permanent bridge was designed and built in 1900 with funds of the Ponce Municipal Government. (Note: This Puente de Los Leones bridge over Río Portugués on today's San Juan-to-Ponce Road (PR-1) should not be confused with another bridge which is also over Río Portugués and is also on a similarly named, but different, San Juan-to-Ponce Road. This other bridge is called "Puente La Milagrosa", but it is on a different San Juan-to-Ponce road, namely (PR-14). Road PR-14, a road that is part of the historic Carretera Central, is a much older road than PR-1, and Puente La Milagrosa is a much older bridge than Puente de Los Leones. Puente La Milagrosa was built in 1868 under the direction of Spanish engineer Miguel Martínez de Campos y Antón (b. Madrid 30 November 1839 - d. 20 November 1906). See Ingenieros de Caminos en Puerto Rico: 1866-1898. Fernando Sáenz Ridruejo. "Anuario de Estudios Atlanticos." ISSN 0570-4065. Las Palmas de Gran Canaria (2009). No 55. pp. 311-342. Accessed 7 June 2018.) An 1899 map titled "Ponce Harbor Porto Rico, Map No. 911", by Otto Hilgard Tittmann (b.1850 - d.1938) of the U.S. Coast and Geodetic Survey and published by Julius Bien & Co Photo Lithographers, New York, New York, shows a bridge over Río Portugués at the road from Ponce to Guayama via Calle Cristina, namely today's (2018) Puerto Rico Highway 1. In 1950, it was named "Puente Blas Silva" (Blas Silva Bridge) in honor of the outstanding architect from Hormigueros who lived most of his adult life in Ponce and designed many structures in the city. The bridge was rebuilt in 1990, and reopened in 1992 at which point it was renamed Puente de los Leones as part of the festivities of the 300th anniversary of the founding of the city.

Prior to its 1992 remodeling, there was a pedestrian bridge on the east end of Puente de Los Leones because, as it existed prior to the 1990 rebuild, pedestrians walking over the bridge first had to cross the highly trafficked Bulevar Miguel Pou to use the bridge's walkway on the one side of Puente Blas Silva. But with the 1990s remodeling, Puente de Los Leones was enlarged to include walkaways on both sides of the bridge and the pedestrian overpass bridge was eliminated. The bridge now has permanent six feet wide pedestrian walkways on both sides.

== Location ==
The shield of the Municipality of Ponce has, as its centerpiece, a lion standing over a bridge.

The bridge is Ponce's best known bridge. It is the gateway to, not just Parque del Tricentenario, but also to the Ponce Historic Zone as well. The bridge runs from west to east and is the eastern terminus of the Bulevar Miguel. To its northeast is the prestigious neighborhood of La Alhambra, the first large upper class suburban expansion developed in Puerto Rico (early 1900s). To its southeast is the Parque Ecologico Urbano. To its west is the Parque del Tricentenario. Parque Lineal Veredas del Labrador, runs along the banks of Río Portugués, under this bridge. Two other bridges provide entry to the Ponce Historic Zone, Calle Guadalupe's Puente La Milagrosa, and Puente Avenida Betances, on the western end of Avenida Tito Castro (PR-14). However, only Puente de los Leones carries four lanes of traffic, carrying a higher volume of traffic into the Ponce Historic Zone than the other two nearby bridges.

== Features ==
It features two brass lions guarding the entrance to the city: the older lion represents wisdom and experience, while the younger one stands for the glorious future. The two lions are the work of Spanish sculptor Victor Ochoa. Both lions are located on the western end of the bridge, on 20 feet high pedestals. Leon Joven (Young lion) in located on the north side of the bridge and Leon Sabio (Wise Lion) is located on the southern side of the bridge.

A metal plaque at the foot of the pedestal of the Leon Joven reads (Note: English translation is not part of the inscription, and it is given here to the right):

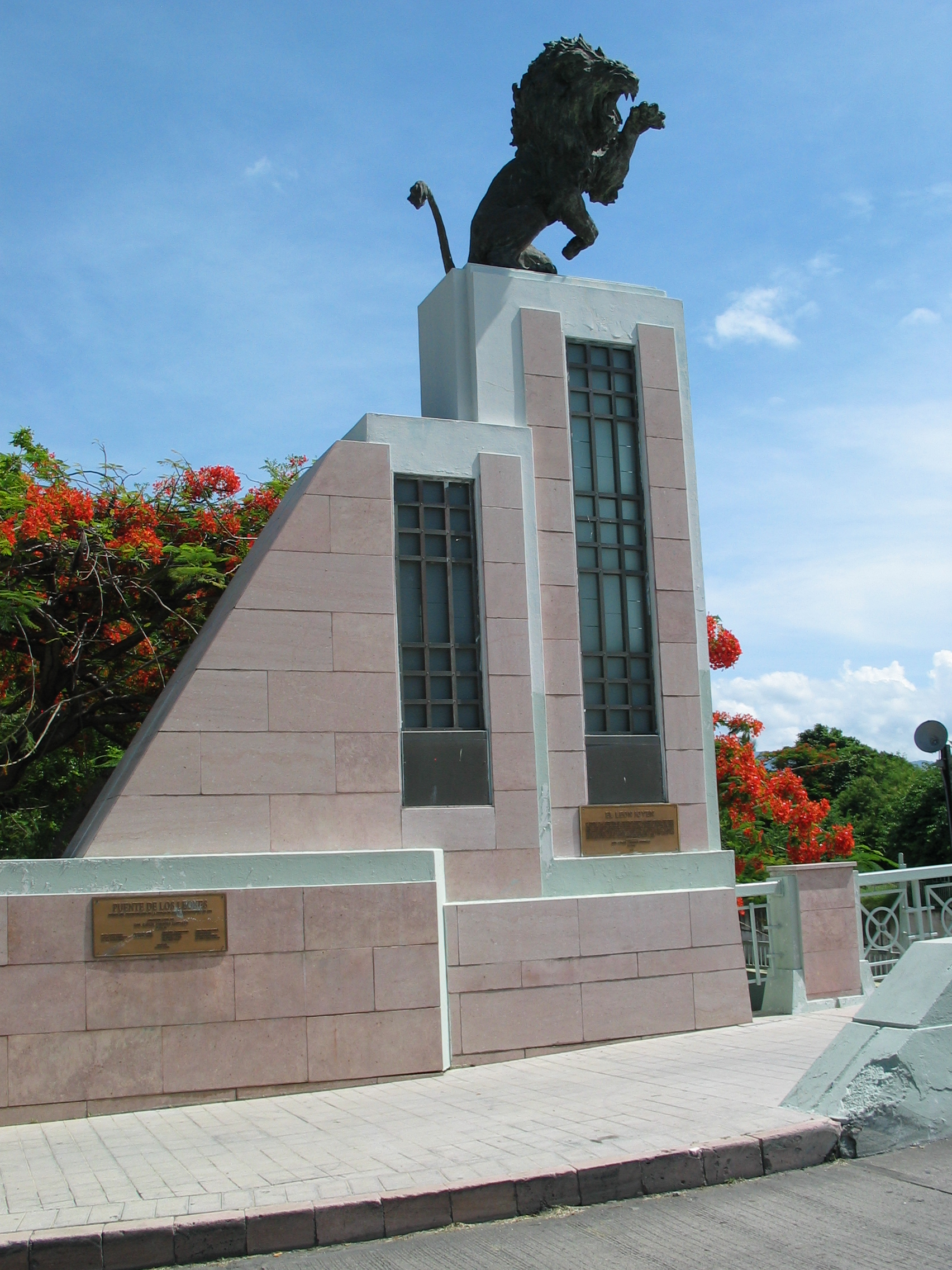
The Young Lion at Puente de los Leones sits on the north side of the bridge (the photo is looking east)

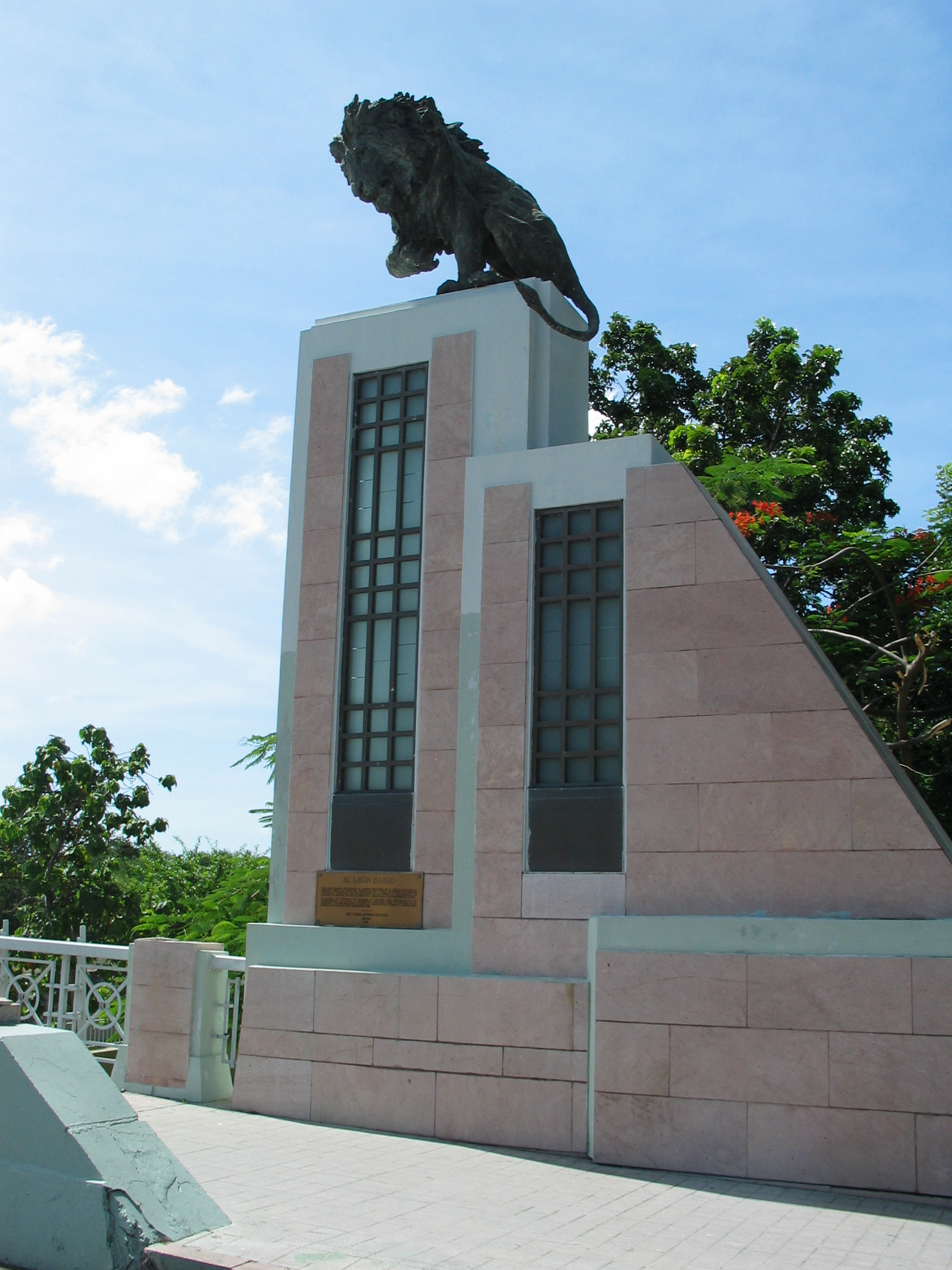
The Wise Lion at Puente de los Leones sits on the south side of the bridge (the photo is looking east)

EL LEON JOVEN -; Es simbolo de la esperanza, del renacer de nuestra valiosa herencia, representa el futuro. Este joven leon se lanza con brios a retomar la gloria que Ponce nunca debio perder. Su estirpe le permite heredar el orgullo, aprender del Sabio Leon y lanzarse a reconstruir la ciudad en todos los ordenes. El Ponceño, como este joven leon, toma la ciudad en sus manos y, con la frente en alto y la mirada llena de dignidad, no se deja domar. El Leon Joven, como el ponceño, mira hacia el futuro alagador, limpio, pujante, lleno de hidalguia y fiel a sus raices, pero incansable en su lucha para que la ciudad nunca vuelva a caer.: Hon. Rafael Cordero Santiago, Alcalde, 1992 -	THE YOUNG LION -; Is a symbol of the hope, the rebirth of our valuable heritage, represents the future. This young lion jumps with zest to retake the glory that Ponce should have never lost. Its lineage allows him to inherit the pride, learn from the Wise Lion and hurl out to rebuild the city in all of its angles. The Poncean, like this young lion, takes the city on his hands and, with his head up high and with eyes full of dignity, he is not tamed. The Young Lion, like the Poncean, looks forward to the flattering future, clean, vigorous, full of nobility, and true to his roots, but tireless in his struggle so the city will never fall again.: Hon. Rafael Cordero Santiago, Mayor, 1992 -

There is, likewise, a plaque at the foot of the pedestal for the Leon Sabio. It reads,

EL LEON SABIO -; Este leon maduro representa el antiguo esplendor de la ciudad de Ponce. La Señorial ciudad de Ponce fue reconocida en y fuera de Puerto Rico por su desarrollo economico, por su esplendor en la arts, la arquitectura, la medicina, el deporte, por ser el baluarte de la agricultura y del comercio de la Isla. Su pujanza fue detendia; sin embargo, el ponceño tenia dentro de si, los conocimientos y el reto de la reconquista. Este Leon Sabio fue custodio de la esperanza y es representativo de todos los ponceños que ayudaron a forja esta ciudad a lo largo de estos trescientos años.: Hon. Rafael Cordero Santiago, Alcalde, 1992 -	THE WISE LION -; This mature lion represents the former splendor of the city of Ponce. The Stately City of Ponce was recognized in and out of Puerto Rico for its financial development, its splendor in the arts, architecture, medicine, sports, for being the bastion of agriculture and commerce in the Island. Its dynamism was halted; however, the people of Ponce had within themselves the knowledge and the challenge of the reconquest. This Wise Lion was custodian of hope and represents all the Ponceans who help forge this city throughout these three hundred years.: Hon. Rafael Cordero Santiago, Mayor, 1992 -

== Architecture ==
The bridge's architectural style follows the Art Deco tradition. It has 16 lampposts, 8 on each side, and is covered with marble. The bridge's main span material is steel and its main span design is stringer/multi-beam or girder. The deck is cast-in-place concrete with a Monolithic Concrete wearing surface (concurrently placed with structural deck). It has an 89.6 feet span length, and 93.5 feet total length. The bridge was designed by architect Ilia Sánchez Arana, who also designed Paseo Arias, a.k.a., Callejón Amor, in downtown Ponce.

== See also ==
- Puente Río Portugués
- Puente La Milagrosa
