= Parque Graciela Rivera =

Passive park in Ponce, Puerto Rico

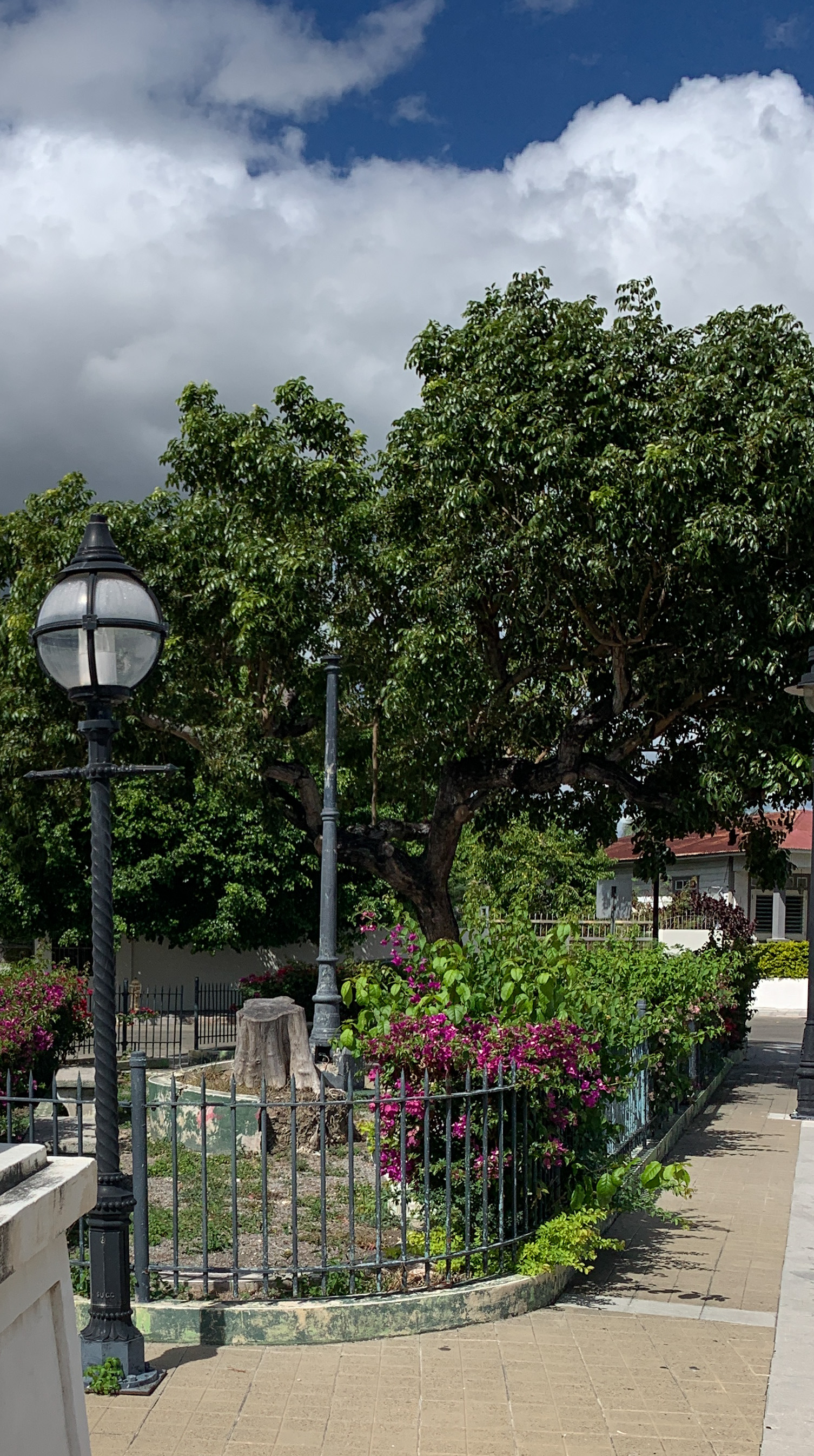
- Interactive map of Parque Graciela Rivera
- Type: Passive park
- Location: Calle Aurora & Calle Torre/Azucena, Barrio Primero, in Ponce, Puerto Rico
- Nearest city: Ponce, Puerto Rico
- Coordinates: 18°0′35.018″N 66°36′58.788″W
- Established: 2006
- Designer: Juan R. Dalmau Simbolin
- Owner: Municipality of Ponce
- Operator: Autonomous Municipality of Ponce
- Status: Open Daily, 24 hours / day
- Parking: Free

Parque Graciela Rivera is a small, but charming, passive park in Barrio Primero, Ponce, Puerto Rico, at the intersection of Calla Aurora and Calle Torre/Calle Azucena. It is flanked by the statue of a woman called "La Labradora" (The Reaper). The park was named after the Puerto Rican soprano singer Graciela Rivera.

== Location ==
The park, triangular in shape, is located at the intersection of Calle Aurora and Calle Torre/Calle Azucena, in a residential area. The park is owned and managed by the Ponce municipal government.

== History ==
The park used to be called Parque Triangular (English: Triangular Park), because of its shape, but its name was changed during the mayoral administration of Francisco Zayas Seijo (2005–2009). In 2006 the park became Parque Graciela Rivera in honor of the opera singer. The park has a statue called "Estatua de La Labradora" (Statue of the Farmer Woman). The park was rebuilt during the administration of Mayor Francisco Zayas Seijo (2005–2009), and dedicated in 2006. The park's architect was Juan R. Dalmau Simbolin. Estatua de La Labradora already existed at the location prior to the 2006 rededication of the park.

=== Name ===
Graciela Rivera (1921–2011) was a Puerto Rican opera singer. She was born in Ponce, and as a child she enjoyed singing. She was considered very talented by her family and teachers alike. Rivera moved to New York after she graduated from high school, enrolled at Juilliard School of Music, graduating in 1943. In 1945, she was given the role of Adele in the musical "Rosalinda", a Broadway version of Johann Strauss II's Die Fledermaus, traveling to France and Germany with the production, and performing as Rosina in "The Barber of Seville" by Gioachino Rossini at the New Orleans Opera.

In December 1951, she became the first Puerto Rican to sing a lead role at the New York Metropolitan Opera as Lucia in the production of Lucia di Lammermoor. She earned accolades for her performance from critics around the world. In 1953, Rivera was proclaimed "Citizen of the Year" by the City of New York. In 1959, Rivera had a weekly radio show at WHOM, at that time WBMP-FM, in New York City. She traveled regularly between New York and Puerto Rico and in Puerto Rico she participated in the IV Pablo Casals Festival.

== Features ==
The park has a few shade trees and benches for relaxation. Due to its very small size, only the perimeter of the park is accessible, with its interior consisting of flower gardens that can be admired from the outside.

== See also ==
- List of parks in Ponce, Puerto Rico
