= Puente La Milagrosa =

Historic bridge in Ponce, Puerto Rico

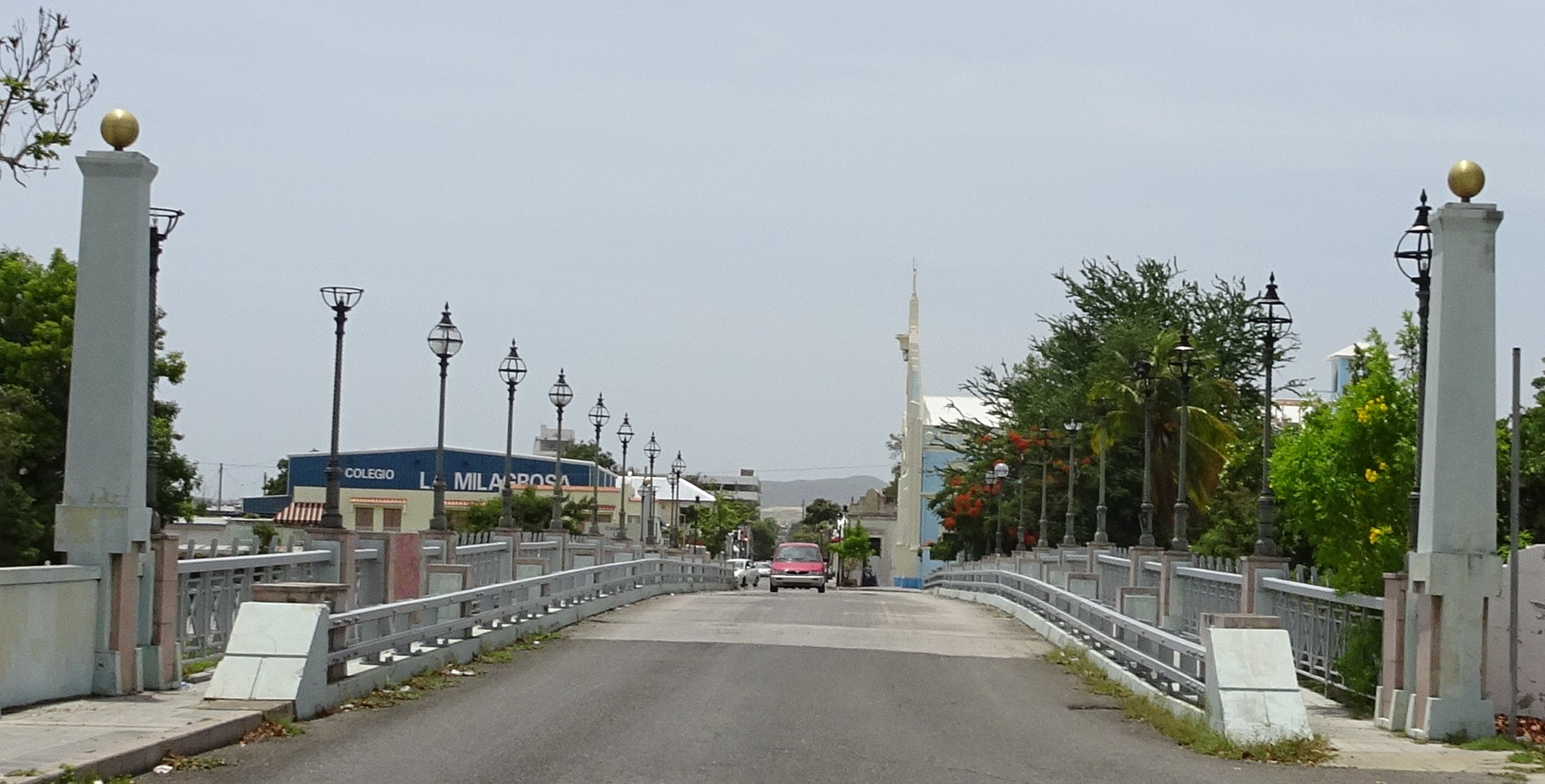
- Puente La Milagrosa, looking west from Barrio Machuelo Abajo towards Barrio Quinto
- Coordinates: 18°01′2.3″N 66°36′25.3″W
- Carries: Vehicular and pedestrian traffic
- Crosses: Río Portugués
- Locale: Ponce, Puerto Rico
- Named for: Catholic parish (f.1928)
- Owner: Ponce Municipal Government
- Maintained by: Ponce Dept of Public Works
- ID number: 022061

Characteristics
- Design: Art Deco
- Total length: 178.5 feet (54.4 m)
- Width: 36.1 feet
- Longest span: 106.3 ft (32 m)
- No. of spans: 2
- Clearance above: Open
- No. of lanes: 2

History
- Architect: Miguel Martínez de Campos Antón
- Opened: 1868; 157 years ago
- Inaugurated: 1868
- Rebuilt: 1994

Statistics
- Daily traffic: 7,500 (Year 2005)
- Toll: No

Puente La Milagrosa is a historic bridge in Ponce, Puerto Rico. The Art Deco bridge carries two lanes of vehicular traffic for the two-way Calle Guadalupe (PR-14R). It runs west to east and crosses Río Portugués connecting Barrio Quinto in the west to Barrio Machuelo Abajo in the east. It is located 0.7 km northeast of Plaza Las Delicias. It is part of the historic Carretera Central.

== History ==
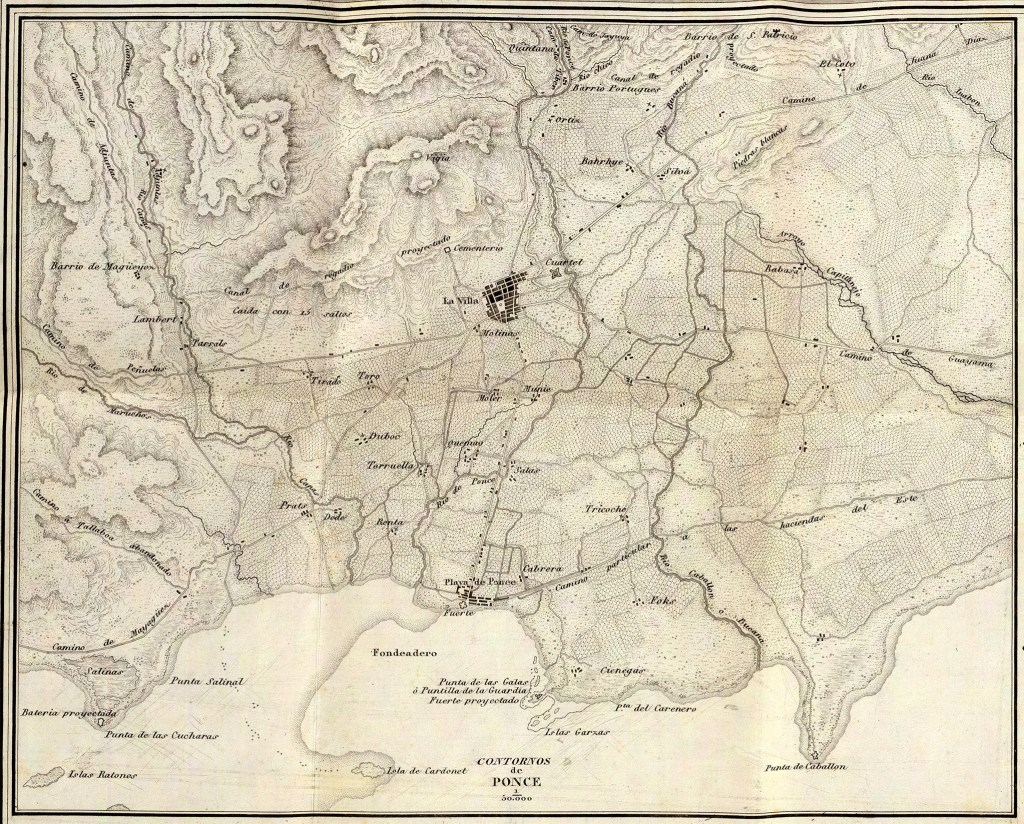
An 1851 map of Ponce showing a crossing (ford) on "Camino a Juana Diaz", where the bridge was built 17 years later (1868)

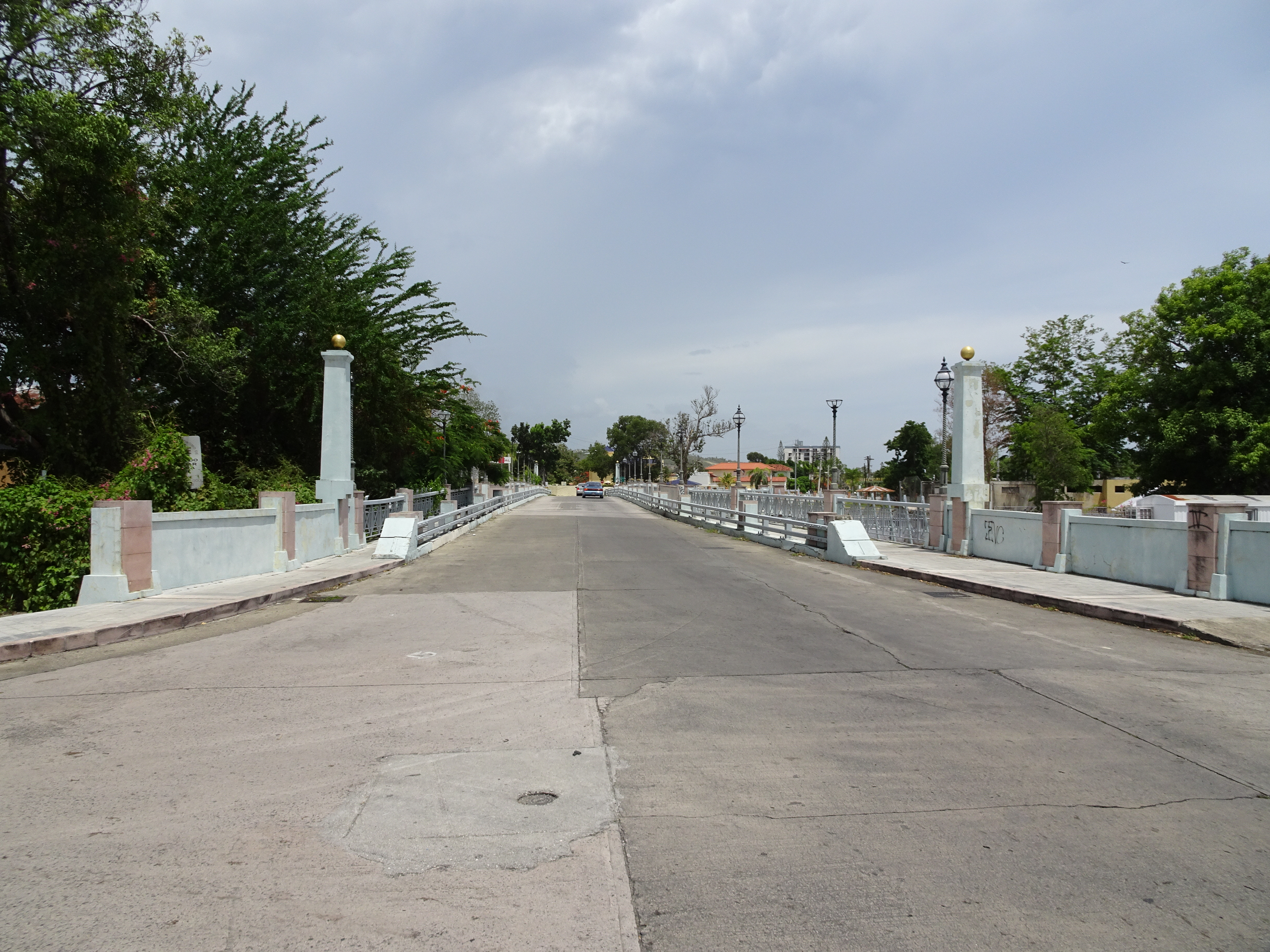
The bridge looking east

The crossing over Río Portugués where the current bridge is located was a ford until 1842, when the first bridge, a wooden bridge, was built. The bridge that replaced the wooden bridge dates from the 19th century when Carretera Central was built to connect the city of Ponce to the city of San Juan. It is a component of said historic road. The replacement Puente La Milagrosa was built in 1868 under the direction of Spanish engineer Miguel Martínez de Campos y Antón (b. Madrid 30 November 1839 - d. 20 November 1906). It was rebuilt starting in 1990, and reopened in 1992 as part of city-wide improvements in preparation for the celebration of its 300th anniversary. This bridge over Río Portugués is one of seven bridges that cross Río Portugués in the city of Ponce and, built in 1868, it is also one of the oldest.

== Description ==
This steel stringer/multi-beam/girder bridge had an 80.1 sufficiency rating in 2019, and consists of an 106 feet span length and a total bridge length of 178 feet. It has ArtDeco tones, most of them expressed via the use of the traditional pink marble used on city of Ponce sidewalks. These tones are used on the handrails decorating the roadway curbs as well as both of its sidewalks.

== Location ==
The bridge is located 0.7 miles northeast of Plaza Las Delicias, the historic downtown area of the city of Ponce. It runs on a west-to-east axis. On its western end is Barrio Quinto's residential neighborhood, including the Colegio La Milagrosa private school. To the east is the prestigious neighborhood of La Alhambra, the first large upper class suburban expansion developed in Puerto Rico (early 1900s). Also on the western bank of Rio Portugues is the Club Deportivo de Ponce, an upper-class social club that operated from the 1920s to the 1970s. What is left of the now-abandoned (2020) Club Deportivo can be seen southeast of the bridge. The bridge is also the northern terminus of Parque Lineal Veredas del Labrador, which runs along the banks of Río Portugués, under this bridge. The bridge is part of a section of Calle Guadalupe that runs together with PR-14R.

== Architecture ==
The bridge's architectural style follows the Art Deco tradition. It has 24 lampposts, 12 on each side, and its sidewalks and walkway railings are covered in pink marble. The bridge's main span material is steel and its main span design is stringer/multi-beam or girder. The deck is cast-in-place concrete with a Monolithic Concrete wearing surface (concurrently placed with structural deck). It has an 106.3 feet span length, and 178.5 feet total length.

== Gallery ==
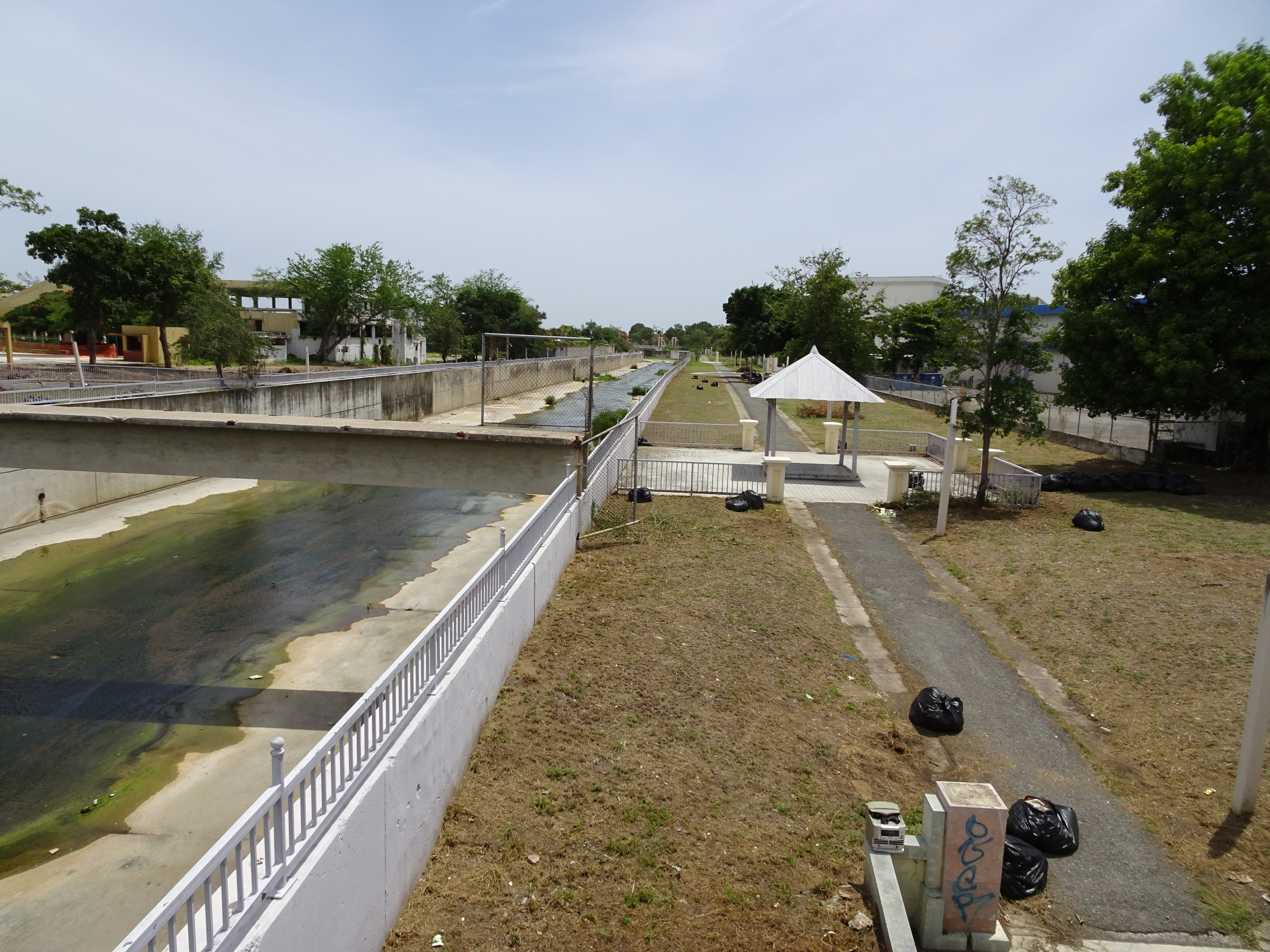
A view from the bridge of Parque Lineal Veredas del Labrador, looking south

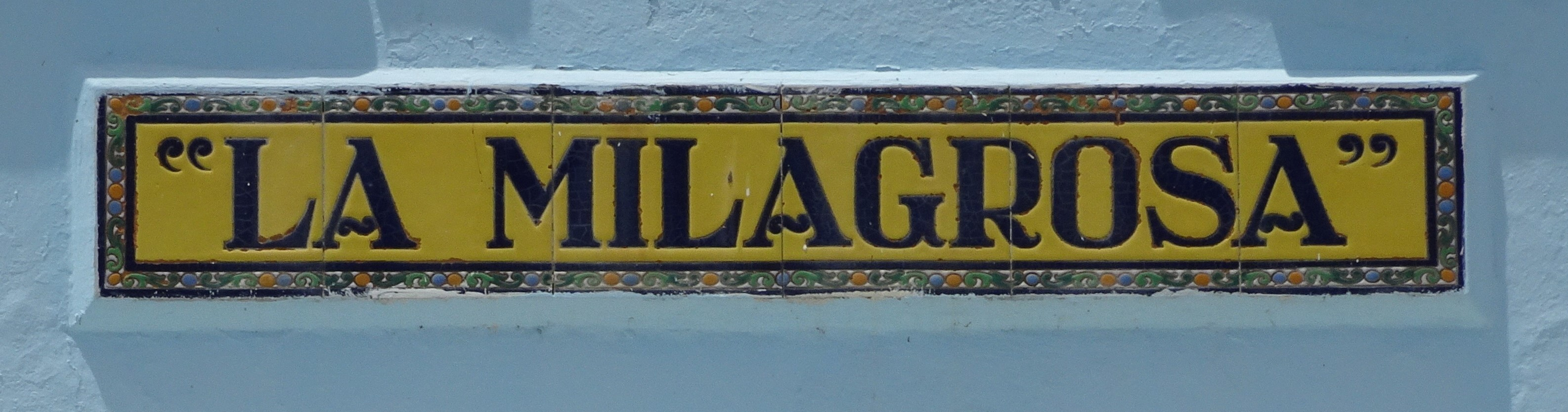
A sign next to the bridge

== See also ==
- Puente Río Portugués
- Puente de los Leones
