= Portugués Dam =

Dam in Tibes, Ponce, Puerto Rico

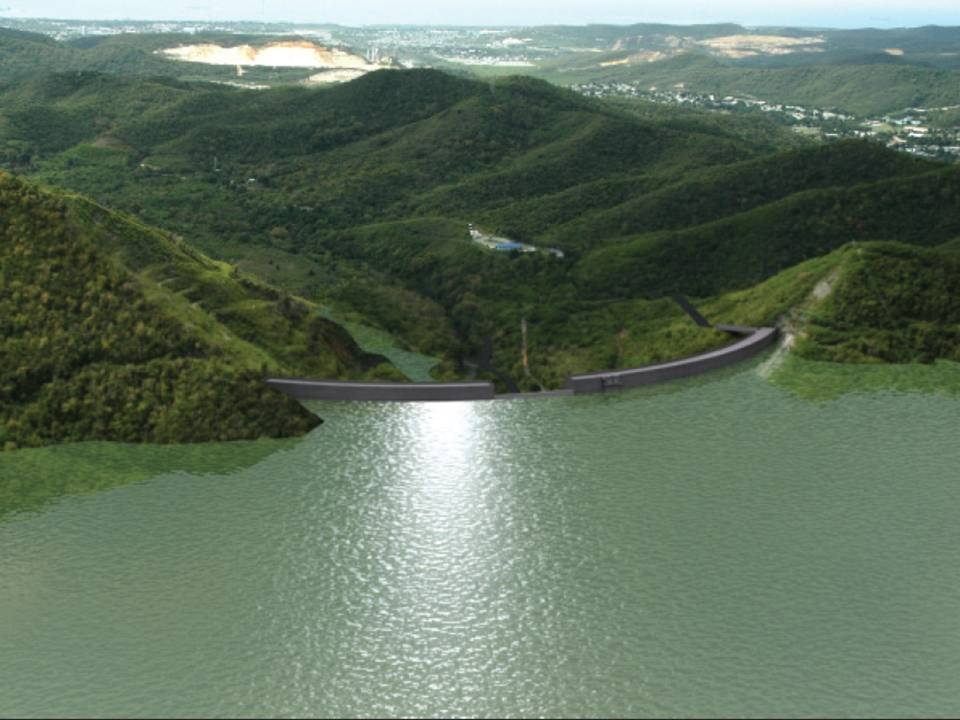
- Artistic rendering of Portugues Dam

- Location of the Portugues Dam in Puerto Rico
- Official name: Represa Portugués
- Location: Tibes, Ponce, PR
- Coordinates: 18°3′44″N 66°37′58″W
- Purpose: Flood control
- Status: Operational.
- Construction began: October 2008
- Opening date: February 2014, operational in 2015
- Construction cost: $750 million USD
- Owner: Government of Puerto Rico
- Operator: USACE

Dam and spillways
- Type of dam: roller-compacted concrete thick arch dam
- Impounds: Portugues River
- Height: 220 feet (67 m)
- Length: 1,230 feet (370 m)
- Width (crest): 35 feet (11 m)
- Width (base): 110 feet (34 m)
- Dam volume: 368,000 cubic yards (281,000 m^{3})

Reservoir
- Creates: Portugues Reservoir
- Total capacity: 392,040 cubic feet (11,101 m^{3})
- Surface area: 215 acres (87 ha)
- Pablo Vázquez Ruiz, head project engineer

The Portugués Dam (Spanish: Represa Portugués) is a roller-compacted concrete thick arch dam on the Portugués River, three miles (5 km) northwest of the city Ponce, in Barrio Tibes, Ponce, Puerto Rico. Construction on the dam began in April 2008, soon after the U.S. Army Corps of Engineers, Jacksonville District awarded the Spanish firm Dragados USA, a division of Grupo ACS, with a $180 million contract in March 2008 to build the dam.

The primary purpose of the dam is flood control; it provides flood protection for 40,000 people and over 13,000 residential structures. The dam is the final component of the Portugués and Bucana Flood Protection Project and the first dam of its type constructed by the U.S. Army Corps of Engineers in the United States or Caribbean. The final cost of the dam was estimated at $375 million; 75% is funded by the U.S. Government and 25% by the Government of Puerto Rico. It is the first dam ever built in the United States that uses the single-centered roller-compacted concrete thick arch technique.

An estimated inauguration date of October 2013 was announced in 2011 but was not met. Subsequently, an inauguration date of 28 January 2014 was also announced. The dam was structurally completed in December 2013 and inaugurated on 5 February 2014. The dam is operated by the Puerto Rico Department of Natural and Environmental Resources.

== History and construction ==
The first government official known to have proposed building a dam to tame Rio Portugues from its devastating effects on the lives and properties of Ponceños was Ponce's 1899 Municipal Engineer-Architect Ramon Gandia Cordoba in his 16 March 1899 report titled Estado Actual de Ponce: Sus Necesidades y Medios Economicos para Satisfacerlas (Current State of [the Municipality of] Ponce, its Needs, and the Financial Means to Satisfy Them). It was a report to the Mayor of Ponce, Luis Porrata-Doria. Up to that point, the recommended solution to control the river had generally been to change its course, but Gandia Cordoba opposed it recommending instead that a dam be created. While other measures were undergone, such as widening the path of the river within the city of Ponce, no dam-building would take place for over seven decades.

Since the 1970s, the U.S. Army Corps of Engineers had been investigating a site to build the Portugués Dam. Despite the many different geographic challenges, the Army Corps was able to choose a suitable dam location and double-curvature thin arch dam design in the 1980s. In the 1990s, foundation test grouting and foundation curtain grouting along with the excavation of 350,000 cubic yards (270,000 m^{3}) of material for the left and right abutments took place.

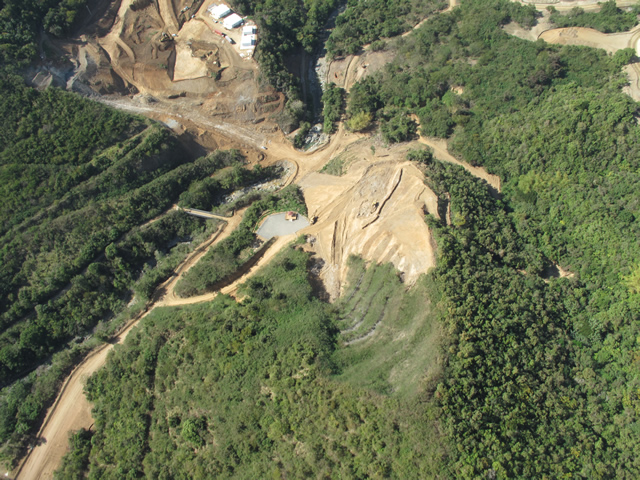
Portugues Dam foundation

When the dam was advertised for construction in 2000, only one proposal was received, and its cost was over the government's budget. To reduce costs, a five-year technical review program was started to research new, lower-cost designs for the dam. The investigation resulted in a lower cost design, switching from the double-curvature thin arch to a single-centered roller-compacted concrete thick arch. Proposals for the dam were requested in 2007 and Dragados USA was awarded an $180 million contract in March 2008 to finish the dam project.

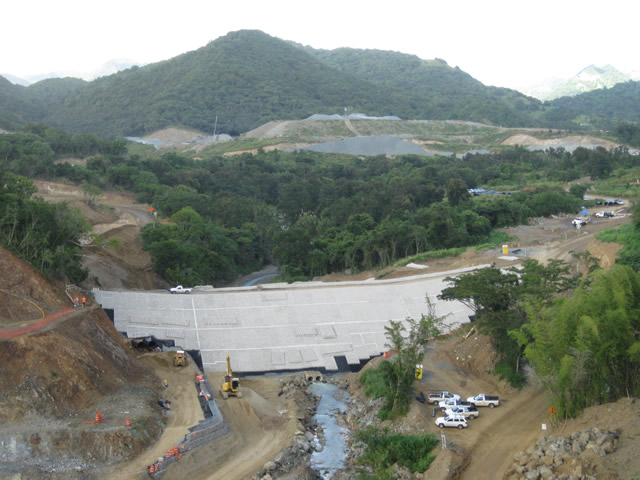
Portugues Dam cofferdam construction

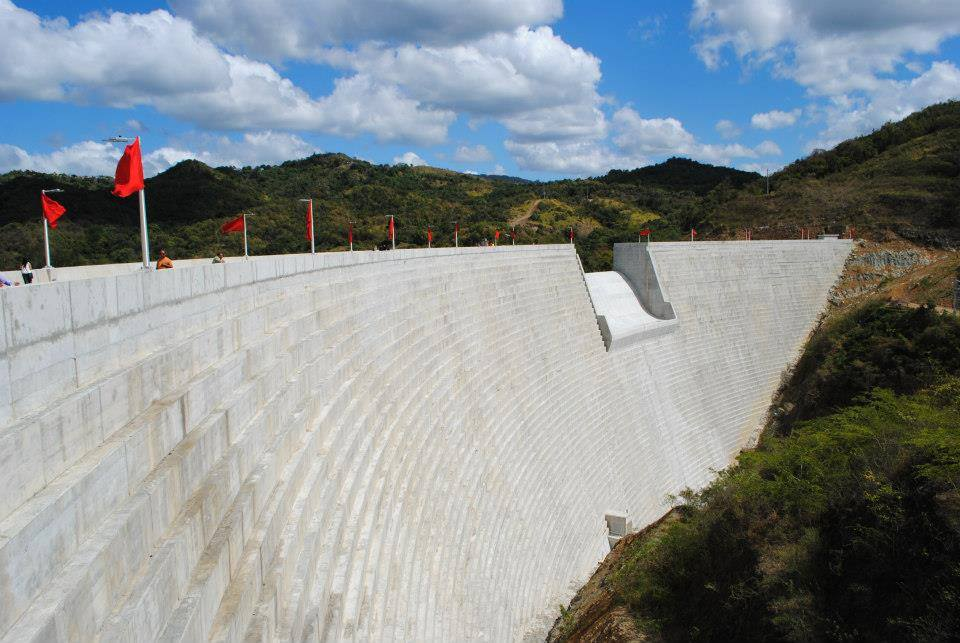
Portugues Dam in 2014

Construction on the dam began in April 2008 and consisted of five phases. Phase 1, at a cost of $24.5 million, included the mobilization, clearing, quarry overburden excavation, power-line relocation activities; Phase 2, costing $47.6 million involved the foundation excavation, aggregate production, dental concrete chores; Phase 3, budgeted at $37.3 million, comprised the aggregate production, and ½ dam RCC placement tasks; Phase 4, at $41.1 million, involved the final dam RCC placement, the spillway, and the intake structure jobs; and Phase 5, at a cost of $29.7 million included the remaining items, such as the valve house, the access road, and mechanical and electrical structures.

As of March 2011, Phase 3 work was underway and the project was 48% complete. The rolled-compacted concrete production facilities had been completed, 700,500 tons of aggregate (for use in concrete) had been produced while foundation preparation continued. RCC placement was placed in 47 ft (14 m) of dam. Construction was initially expected to be completed by 2012, but was later postponed. In December 2013 the dam was completed and its inauguration occurred on 5 February 2014. Pending reservoir-filling and testing of the dam, making it operational was announced for early 2015.

== Dam characteristics ==
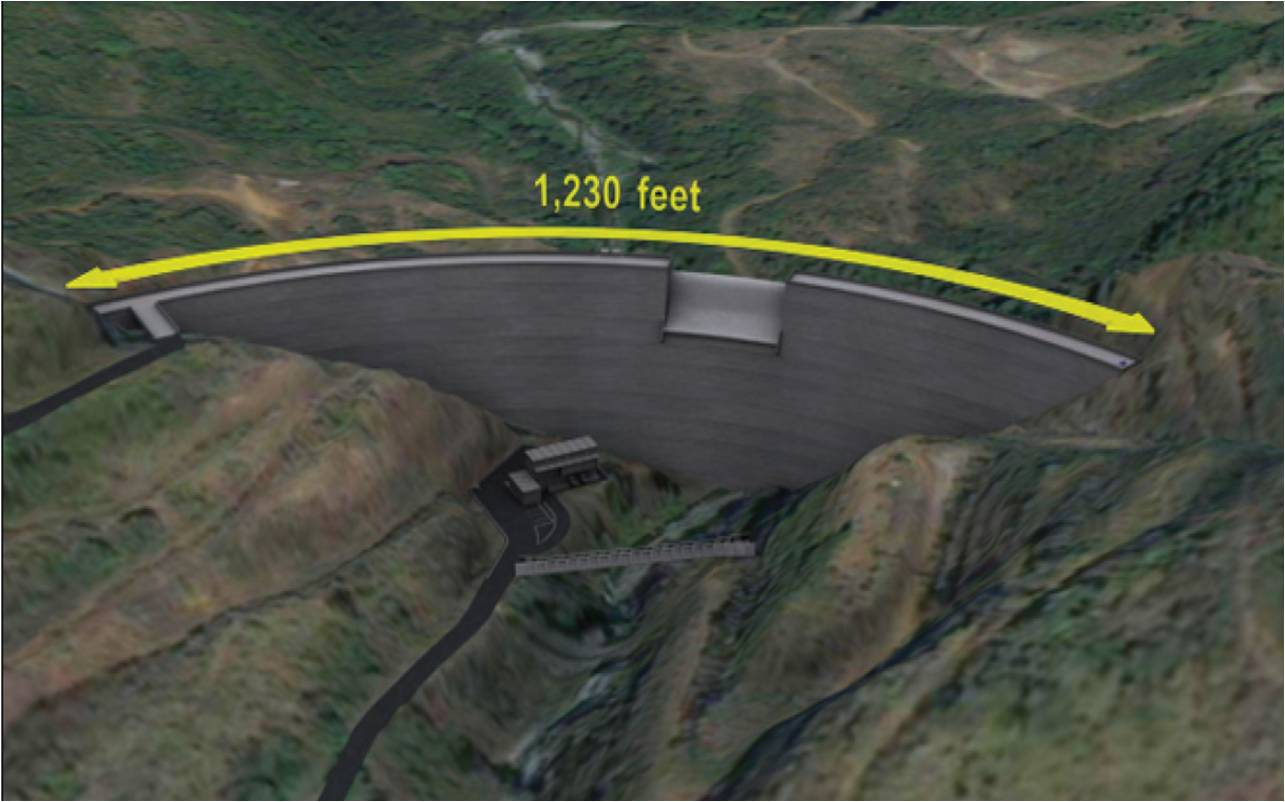
Artistic rendering of Portugues Dam

The Portugués Dam is a 220 feet (67 m) high and 1,230 feet (370 m) long single-centered roller-compacted concrete thick arch. Containing 367,000 cubic yards (281,000 m^{3}) of roller-compacted concrete, it is 110 feet (34 m) thick at its base and 35 feet (11 m) thick at its crest. The dam has an uncontrolled spillway center-left side, over the river bed; 21 ft (6.4 m) below the dams crest of 534.6 ft (162.9 m) above sea level. The center of the dam straddles an intake and outlet structure which will draw water from behind the dam and discharge it into the river valley.

== Archeological findings ==
During excavation, a 130 ft × 160 ft (40 m × 49 m) Pre-Columbian era ceremonial plaza ("batey" or ball court) used by the ancient Tainos was discovered at a construction site used for disposing of the Portugués Dam's construction rubbish. A 60 ft (18 m) long row of intricately carved stones bearing petroglyphs that appeared to date to the 11th or 12th century was also discovered. Additionally, a burial ground containing 40 well-preserved sets of human remains was discovered. Fifteen percent of the site was believed to have been uncovered up to that point and it was reported that as many as 400 bodies may be buried there. The site had been initially marked during a cultural resource survey in 1979 but excavation work in 2007 prompted the major discovery.

The Army Corps of Engineers found an alternate rubbish disposal site and performed mitigation work in order to preserve the site, adding $3 million in additional project costs. Despite objections of locals, the Army Corps was bound by federal law and had to transport artifacts and human remains to a federally-approved laboratory in Georgia. The artifacts and human remains would, reportedly, be returned to Puerto Rico when the investigation is complete. The site was covered, awaiting future excavation.

== Gallery ==
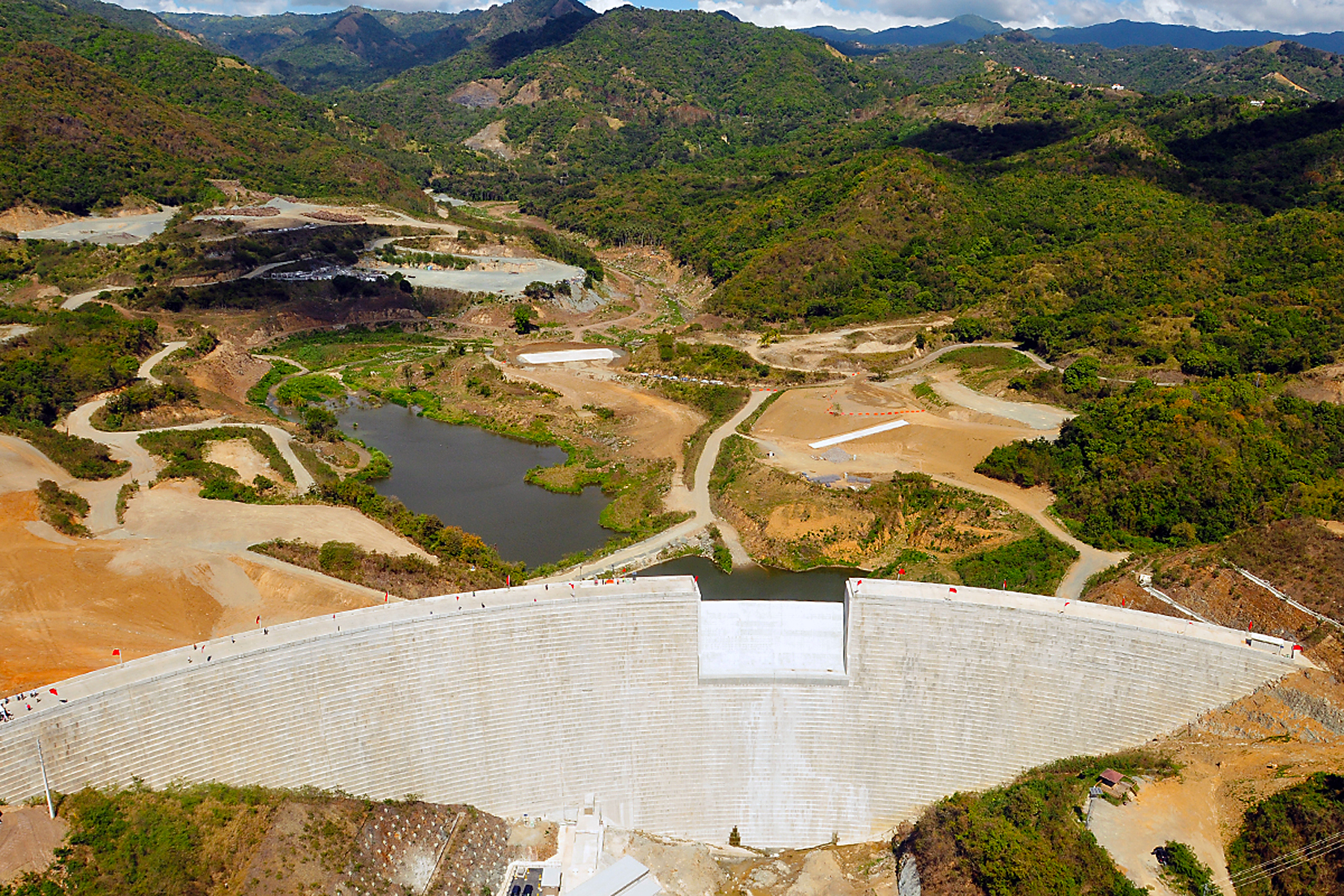
Aerial view of dam, 2014

== See also ==
- List of dams and reservoirs in Puerto Rico
- Ponce, Puerto Rico
- Portugues River
