= Graciela Rivera =

Puerto Rican soprano singer

- Graciela Rivera, circa 1950

Background information
- Born: 17 April 1921; Ponce, Puerto Rico
- Died: 17 July 2011 (aged 90) Mays Landing, New Jersey
- Genres: Opera
- Occupation: Opera Singer
- Instrument: Voice

Graciela Rivera (17 April 1921 – 17 July 2011) was the first Puerto Rican to sing a lead role at the Metropolitan Opera in New York.

== Early years ==
Graciela Rivera was born in Ponce, Puerto Rico. She was the seventh of eight children born to evangelical minister-cabinetmaker Gonzalo Salvador Rivera and Enriqueta Padilla. As a child she enjoyed singing. As a church pastor, her father who would often play in his record player the opera music of Caruso. He owned a piano and when he played she would sing church hymns with her mother. She was considered very talented by her family and teachers alike.

Her family moved to Cataño and later to Santurce, a section of San Juan, where she finished her primary and secondary education. She was a student at Santurce Central High School when she auditioned and participated in school productions of "The Magic Flute", "Il trovatore", "Rigoletto", "Lucia di Lammermoor" and "Aida" (Ms. Rivera believes these were the first operas ever produced by a high school anywhere in the world). She delighted audiences in Puerto Rico with her soprano voice in concerts which she organized. She planned to use the money obtained from these concerts to pay for her studies at the Juilliard School of Music in New York City.

== Broadway ==
Rivera moved to New York after she graduated from high school. She enrolled at Juilliard's and took voice classes with Lucia Dunham, piano lessons, music theory, harmony and composition, graduating in 1943. Upon the outbreak of World War II, she sang for the American troops overseas as a member of the Red Cross.

In 1945, she was given the role of Adele in the musical "Rosalinda", a Broadway version of Johann Strauss II's Die Fledermaus. Rivera traveled to France and Germany with the production. That same year she made her operatic debut as Rosina in "The Barber of Seville" by Gioachino Rossini at the New Orleans Opera.

== New York Metropolitan Opera ==
External audio
- You may listen to Graciela Rivera's interpretation of Manuel Fernández Juncos' version of the "La Borinqueña" on YouTube.

In December 1951, she became the first Puerto Rican to sing a lead role at the New York Metropolitan Opera as Lucia in the production of Lucia di Lammermoor. She earned accolades for her performance from critics around the world. In 1953, Rivera was proclaimed "Citizen of the Year" by the City of New York.

In 1954, Rivera was featured as a guest singer in Name That Tune, and later that year, at an instance of Your Show of Shows, serving as a replacement for Marguerite Piazza. In 1956, she performed at the Theater of the University of Puerto Rico and one of her back-up singers was a young fellow Puerto Rican by the name of Justino Diaz, who would eventually also become an opera singer. That same year Rivera was presented with a special recognition by the Government of Puerto Rico.

In 1959, Rivera returned to New York where she had a weekly radio show at WHOM. She traveled regularly between New York and Puerto Rico, in Puerto Rico she participated in the IV Casals Festival.

== Personal life ==
In 1940, Rivera met Joseph Zumchak, a U.S. Navy LTJG while he was stationed in San Juan. They married in New York in 1941.

== Later years and death ==
She taught Puerto Rican music, Italian and Spanish at the Hostos Community College for 15 years before retiring in 1987. She also held conferences at Hunter College, Rutgers College and Lehman College. In 1993, Rivera earned her Doctorate Degree in Humanities from the Pontifical Catholic University of Puerto Rico and in 1996 she was bestowed with a Honoris Causa from Lehman College.

Rivera died on 17 July 2011 at her home in the Mays Landing section of Hamilton Township, Atlantic County, New Jersey. She was survived by her daughter, Ginny Soto, and son-in-law, Sam Soto, of Mays Landing, N.J.; her daughter-in-law, Jean Marie Zumchak; and her grandchildren, Joseph Zumchak III, and Jacob Zumchak of Port Richey, Fla.; in addition to many nieces and nephews. She was buried at the Puerto Rico National Cemetery next to her husband Joseph Zumchak.

== Legacy ==
The city of Ponce has a small park, Parque Graciela Rivera, in Barrio Primero, dedicated to her memory. The park has a statue called "Estatua de La Labradora" (Statue of the Farmer Woman). The park was rebuilt during the administration of Mayor Francisco Zayas Seijo (2005 - 2009), and dedicated in 2006. The park's architect was Juan R. Dalmau Simbolin. Estatua de La Labradora, already existed at the location prior to the 2006 rededication of the park. Rivera is also recognized at the Park for the Illustrious Ponce Citizens.

== See also ==
- List of Puerto Ricans
- History of women in Puerto Rico
