= Puente Río Portugués =

Historic bridge in Ponce, Puerto Rico

- U.S. National Register of Historic Places
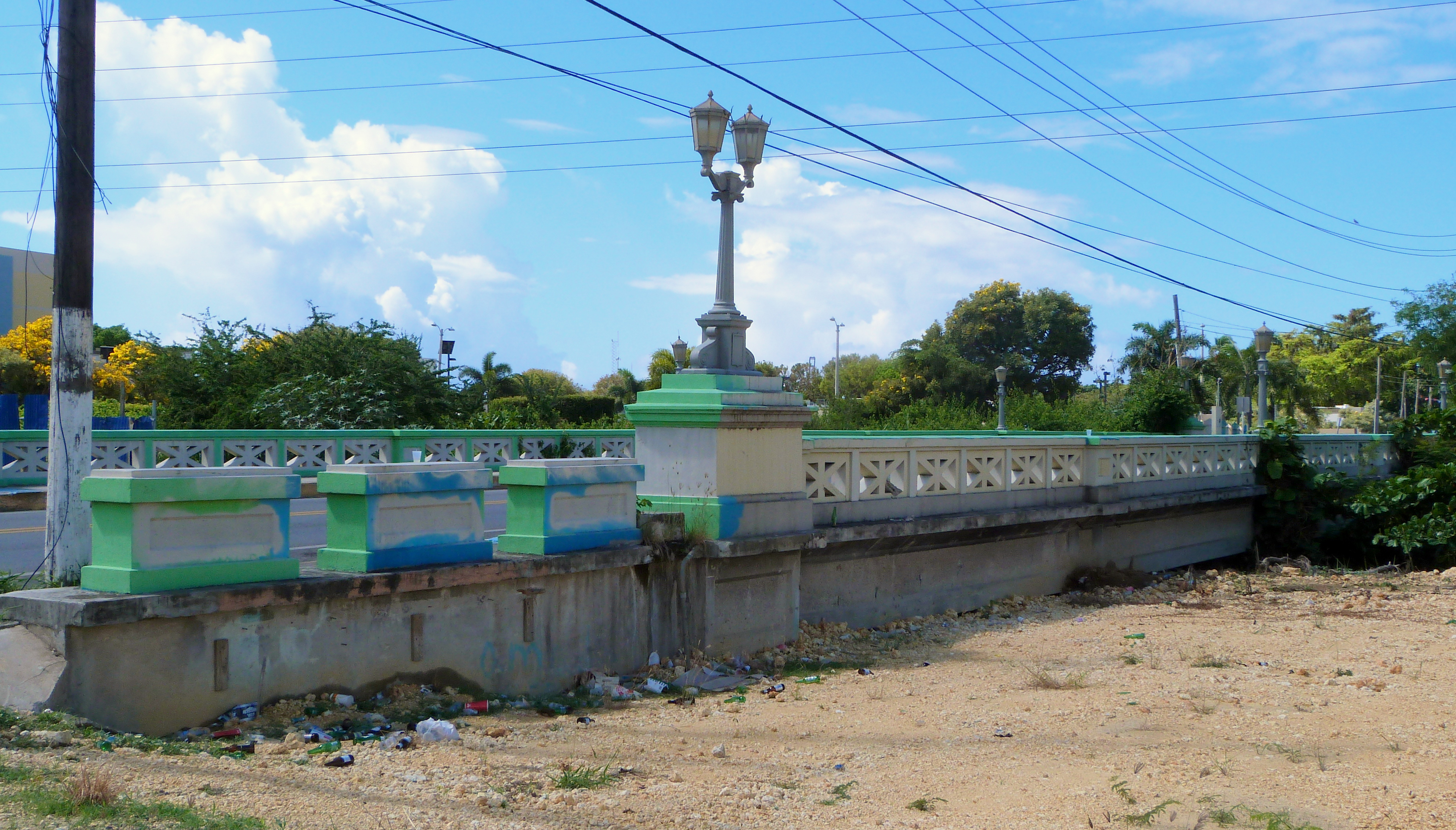
- The bridge in 2017, looking south-southeast
- Location: Ave. Hostos, km 3.9; Bo. Playa, Ponce, PR
- Area: 1,140 m^{2} (12,300 sq ft)
- MPS: Historic Bridges of Puerto Rico MPS
- NRHP reference No.: 14001134
- Added to NRHP: 6 January 2015

Puente Río Portugués
- Coordinates: 17°59′36″N 66°36′55″W
- Crosses: Río Portugués
- Locale: Bo. Playa, Ponce, Puerto Rico
- Other name: Bridge 0145
- Maintained by: Ponce Dept of Public Works
- Preceded by: Puente Alfonso XII(1876-1899); Ponce Electric Co.(1899-1933)

Characteristics
- Design: Art Deco
- Total length: 249 feet (76 m)
- Width: 49 feet (15 m)
- No. of lanes: 2 lanes

History
- Designer: Rafael Nones
- Engineering design by: René Esteves
- Constructed by: Victor A. Auffant
- Construction cost: $48,484 ($1.21 million in 2025 dollars)
- Opened: 1933; 93 years ago
- Replaces: Puente Ponce Electric Co.

Statistics
- Daily traffic: 8,000
- Toll: No

Location
- Interactive map of Puente Río Portugués

The Puente Río Portugués is a historic bridge over the former course of the Río Portugués in barrio Playa in the municipality of Ponce, Puerto Rico. The bridge was added to the U.S. National Register of Historic Places in 2015. The bridge is prominent as "the oldest longitudinal steel beams / reinforced concrete bridge built within the historic Carretera Central". It is located on Avenida Hostos, just south of its intersection with Ponce Bypass.

== History ==
On 25 September 1852, the editor of Ponce newspaper El Ponceño suggested a bridge be built where Puente Río Portugués is currently located. In 1856, the Ponce City Hall took on the matter and named a commission to detail the budget needed to build a bridge over Río Portugués. On 25 June 1857, the Puerto Rico Bidding Board opened up the bidding process and, having only one bid, it was given to Juan Bertoli Calderoni for his 12,400 pesos quote. The bridge would be known as Principe de Asturias Bridge or Principe Alfonso Bridge. The bridge opened in 1862. However, in 1864, there were floods that raze and destroyed it.

In 1876, the first non wooden bridge built at the site was brought from France, christened with the name Alfonso XII, and installed that year. This metal bridged was used for 23 years until the river knocked it off as a result of the rising waters from Hurricane San Ciriaco in 1899.

In 1903 a contract was awarded to Carlos Clausells for a wooden submersible bridge over Portugués River.

The French bridge was recovered 15 years later, in 1914, and installed near Yauco, over Yauco's Rio Duey, where it provided service until 1991, and today (2011) in can be seen at the Parque Urbano de Yauco, on highway PR-127 near the intersection with PR-128.

Thirty-four years after the hurricane, in 1933, the current bridge, Puente Rio Portugues, was inaugurated. A steel plaque identifies the sitting governor and other officials at the time. It was built at a cost of $48,484 ($1.21 million in 2025 dollars).

== Architecture ==
The bridge is architecturally Art Deco style and structurally it is built as a longitudinal beam with the exterior made up of reinforced concrete, steel, and cast iron. Rafael Nones of the Puerto Rico Department of the Interior was in charge of its design.

== Gallery ==
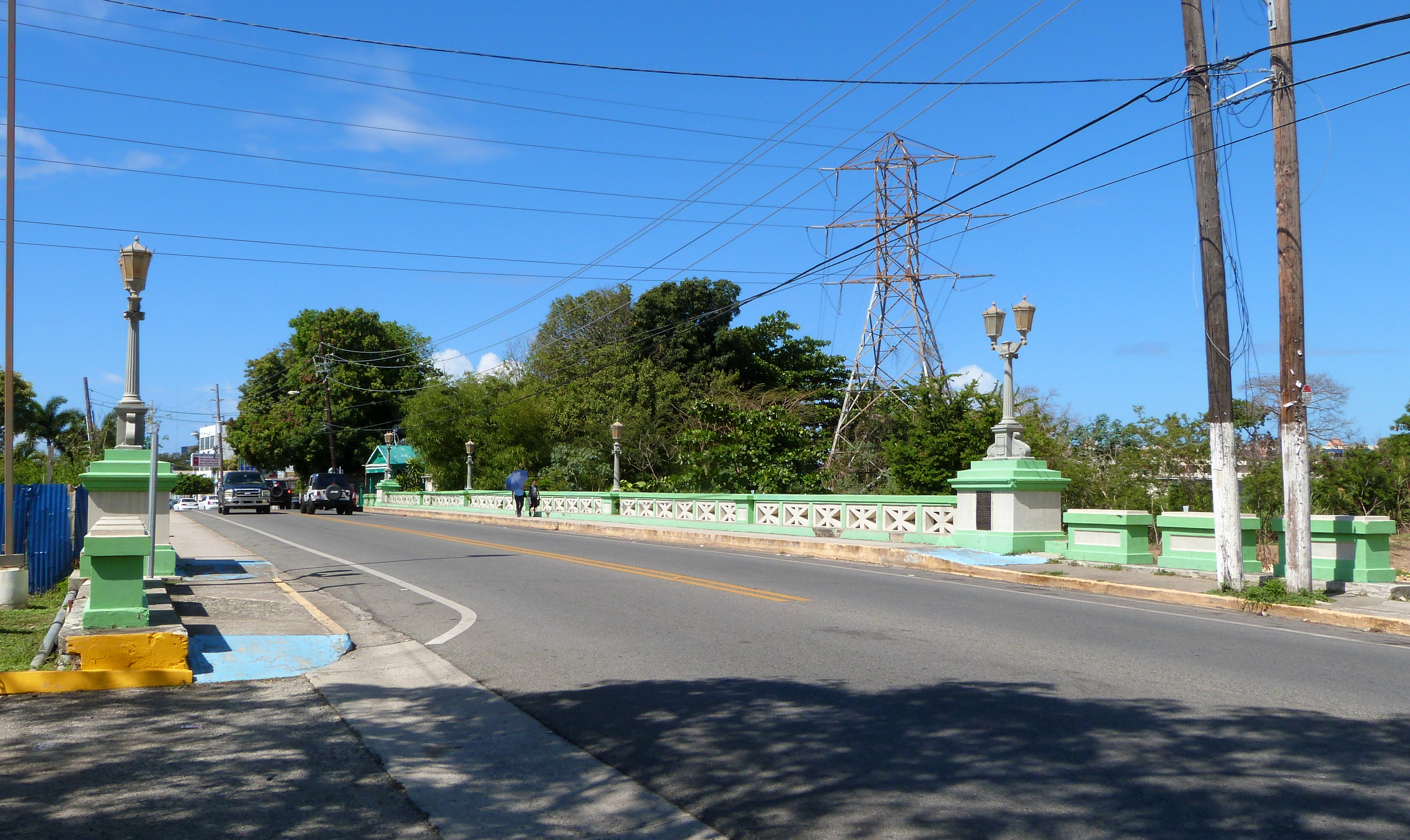
View of the bridge looking south-southwest towards Barrio Playa

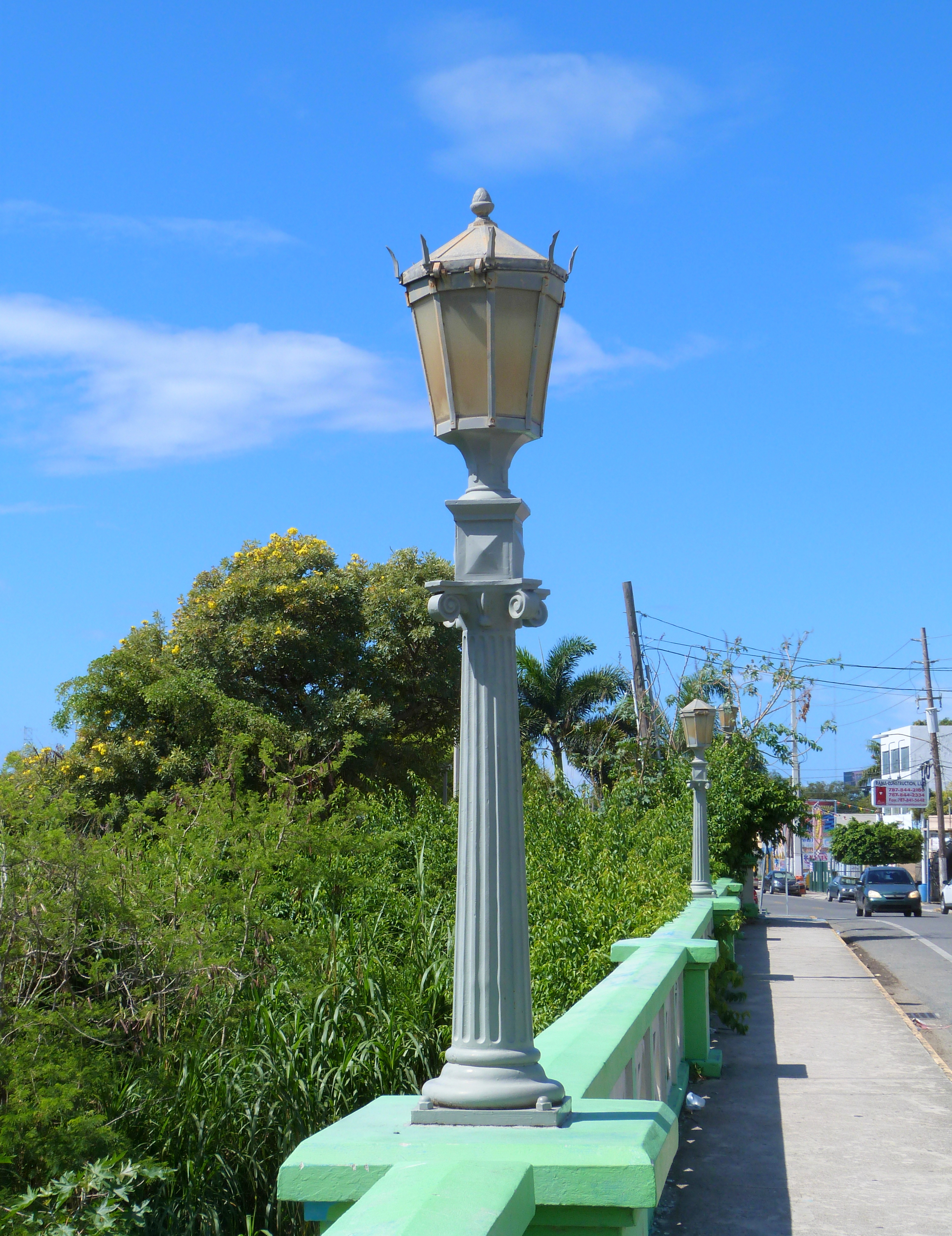
Lamppost on Puente Río Portugués

== See also ==
- Puente de los Leones
- Puente La Milagrosa
- National Register of Historic Places listings in Ponce, Puerto Rico
