= Parque de la Ceiba =

Park in San Antón, Ponce, Puerto Rico

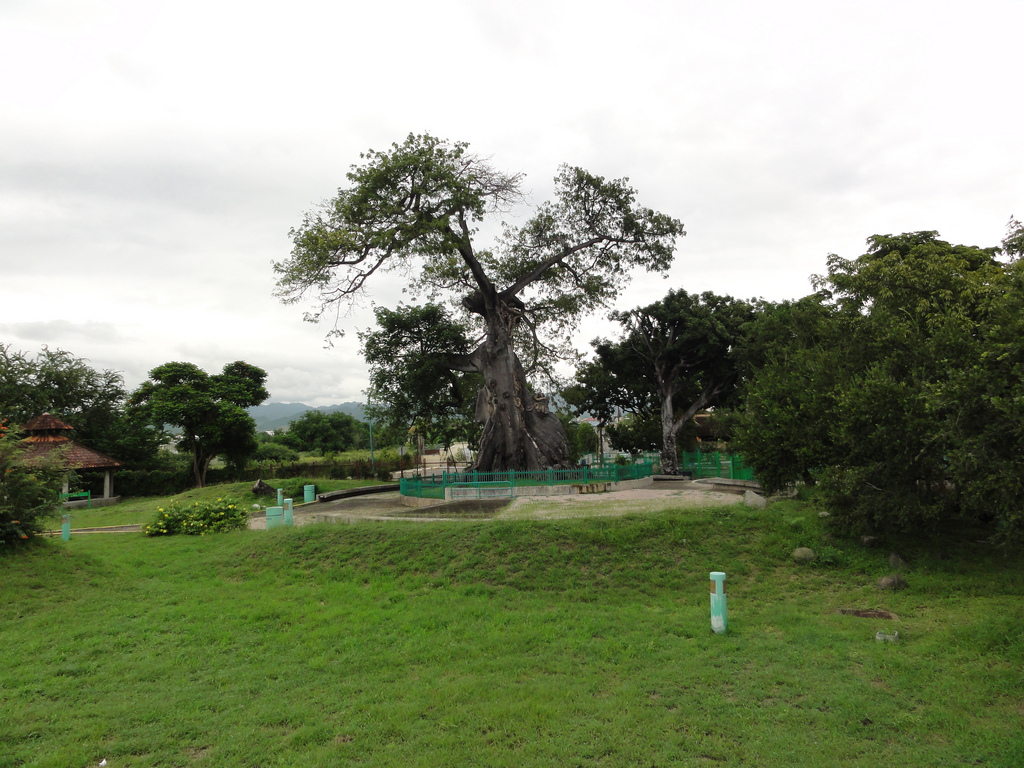
- The Ceiba tree at Parque de la Ceiba in Barrio San Anton in Ponce, PR, as it appeared in November 2010
- Interactive map of Parque de la Ceiba
- Type: Passive park
- Location: PR-133 / Calle Comercio, Cuatro Calles sector, Barrio San Antón, in Ponce, Puerto Rico
- Coordinates: 18°00′30.28″N 66°36′22.50″W
- Area: approx 0.6 cuerdas
- Created: 1984
- Operator: Autonomous Municipality of Ponce
- Status: Open Daily, 8am to 4:30pm

Parque de la Ceiba (English: Ceiba Tree Park) is a passive park in sector Cuatro Calles of barrio San Antón, Ponce, Puerto Rico. Its centerpiece is the historic Ceiba pentandra, a tree associated with the founding of the city. Now surrounded by the park with the same name, the emblematic 500-year-old Ceiba tree stands on the edge of the Ponce Historic Zone. The park opened in 1984, under the administration of Mayor Jose Dapena Thompson. A sign on the fence that surrounds the tree identifies its species as Ceiba pentandra.

== Location ==
The park is located on Comercio street, next to Rio Portugues in the Cuatro Calles sector of barrio San Antón. Today the area is a mixed residential/commercial area on urban route PR-133. The park is managed by the Ponce municipal government. The tree is about half a mile east of Plaza Las Delicias.

== History ==
The park sits on an area believed to have been the site of the first settlement of Europeans in the Ponce region. "In the surroundings of the legendary Ceiba de Ponce, broken pieces of indigenous pottery, shells, and stones were found to confirm the presence of Taino Indians long before the Spaniards that latter settled in the area."

It has been said that this tree was already a large tree at the time of the arrival of Christopher Columbus to the New World. Reference is also made to a book that suggests the tree already existed in 1696, and an 1818 map of Ponce by Alejandro Ordóñez shows the location of the tree.

In 1916, the tree measured 118 feet in circumference, measured at 4 feet from the ground surface.

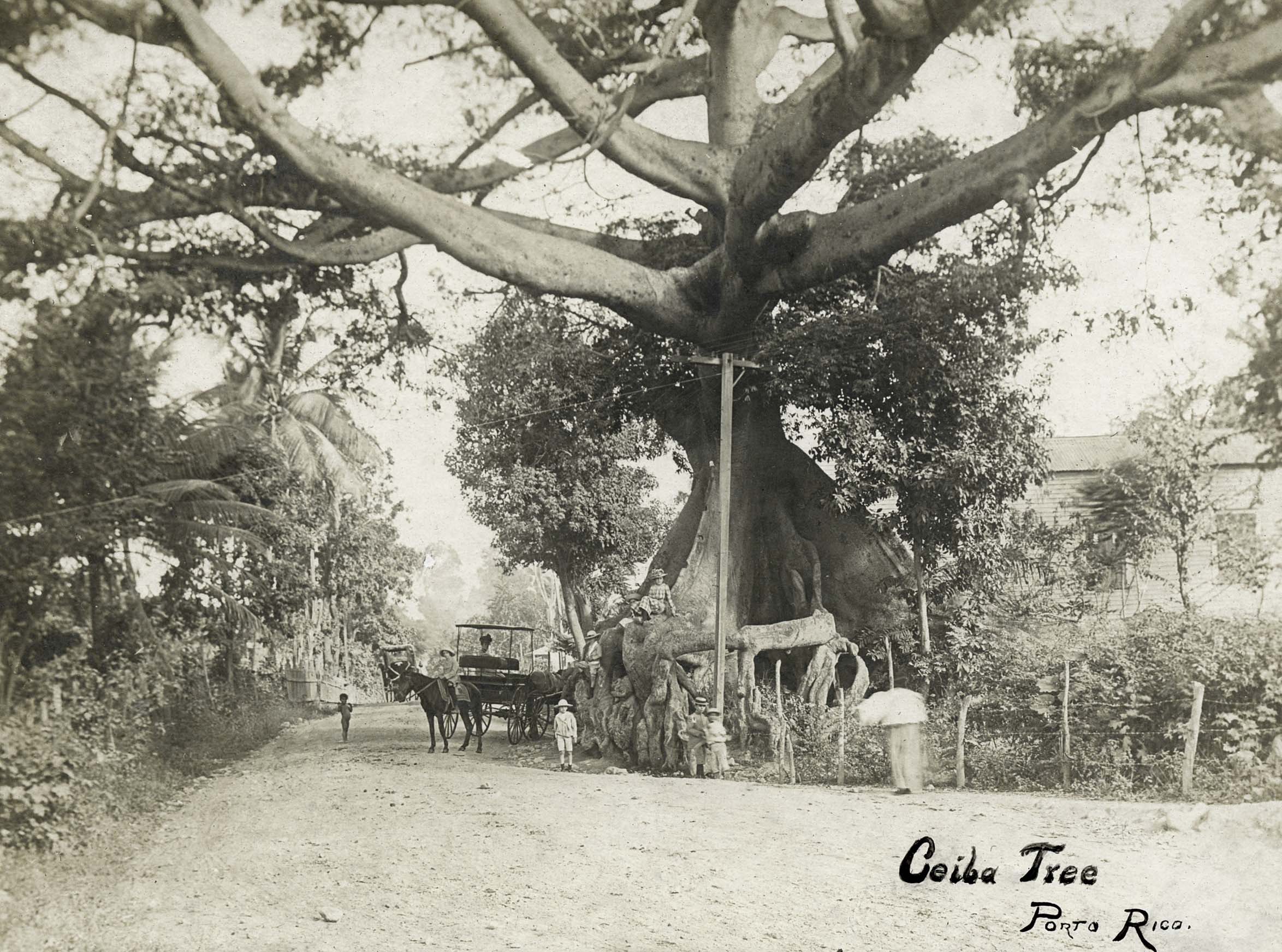
Photograph of the ceiba tree taken in 1900.

== The tree ==
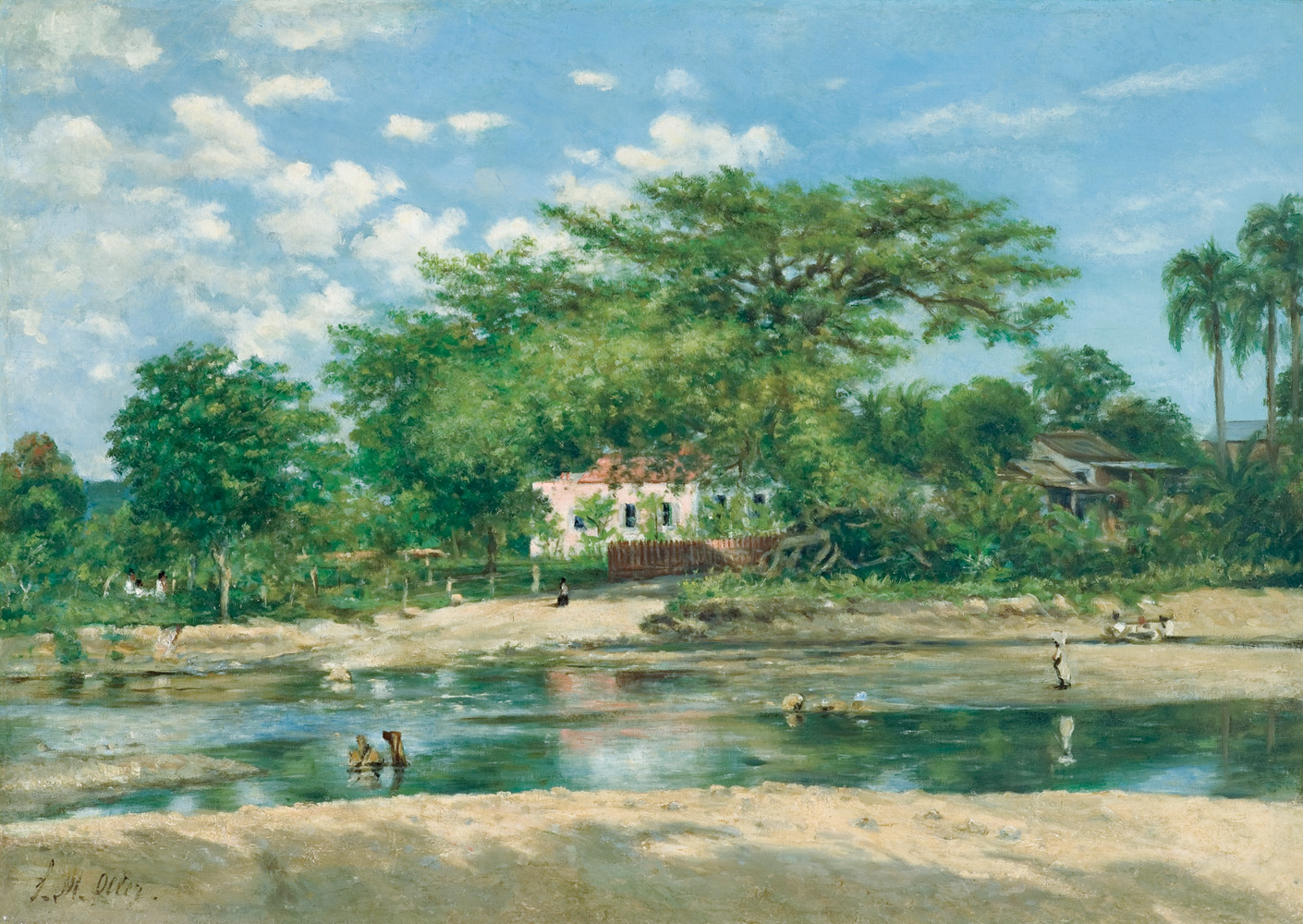
Francisco Oller's 1888 depiction of La ceiba de Ponce at Museo de Arte de Ponce

The feature of the park is the historic centuries-old tree. The tree is also known as 'kapok' and 'silk cotton' tree. The scientific name of the tree is Ceiba pentandra. The legendary tree belongs to the genus Ceiba, of the species pentandra, and the family Bombacaceae. The word Ceiba comes from a Taino word pronounced say-bah. Ceiba is one of the largest and tallest trees in the tropics of the Western Hemisphere. They have been known to reach heights of over 180 feet. The tree is closely related to the peculiar baobab trees of Africa. The Ceiba tree is also Puerto Rico's official national tree.

=== Conservation ===
The tree has recently been decaying and, on 30 December 2006, it lost a large limb that accounted for some 30 percent of its foliage at that time. The channeling of Rio Portugues and the development of a nearby recreational area have been mentioned as possible causes for the rapid deterioration of the tree in recent years. In June 2009, the environmentalist group ProOrnato Inc and the government of the municipality of Ponce joined efforts to preserve the old tree in a weekend-long event. On 18 July 2011, however, the tree lost another large limb. After this event, only 35 percent of the remaining tree was estimated to still be alive.

By the late 2010s, the tree's condition had continued to deteriorate significantly. In 2021, municipal authorities confirmed that the historic ceiba tree had died after centuries of existence. Its remains have since been preserved as a cultural and historical landmark within Parque de la Ceiba.

=== Characteristics ===
The fruit of the Ceiba tree contains a fiber that is eight time lighter than cotton and five times more buoyant than cork. As such it was used as the flotation for early life preservers. In addition to these attributes, the fiber fully repels water, has a low thermal conductivity and is resistant to rot. A little known fact is that before synthetics were used for insulation materials, mattresses and pillows, these were stuffed with the fiber of the Ceiba tree fruit. It was recently discovered that the absorption capacity of this fiber is also higher than that of the polypropylene material normally used in the cleanup of environmental oil spills. "The wood of the Ceiba tree is exceedingly lightweight and easily worked. However, because it lacks durability and is susceptible to insects and decay, it was mostly used for the construction of large canoes by the indigenous inhabitants of the region." Canoes made of Ceiba tree trunks were able to seat over 100 men.

== In the arts ==
La Ceiba de Ponce is depicted in Francisco Oller’s first impressionist landscape masterpiece (1888) and on display at the Museo de Arte de Ponce.
