= Portugués River =

River of Puerto Rico

Río Portugués Río Baramaya, Río Ponce, Río Tibes
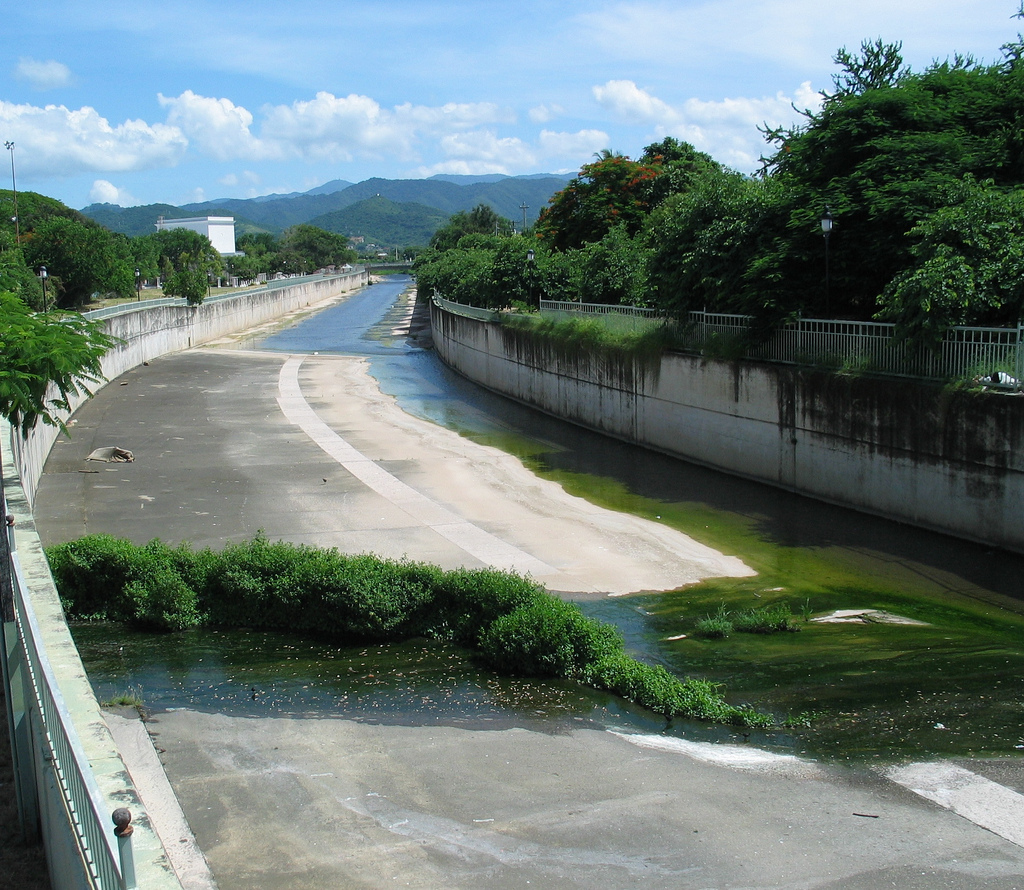
- Portugues River in Ponce, Puerto Rico, looking north from Puente de Los Leones at Miguel Pou Boulevard (PR-1)
- Etymology: Barrio Tibes

Location
- Commonwealth: Puerto Rico
- Municipality: Ponce

Physical characteristics
- Source
  - location: Barrio Portugués, Adjuntas, Puerto Rico
  - coordinates: 17°59′31.488″N 66°35′51.2874″W
  - elevation: 2,853 feet (870 m)
- Mouth
  - location: Bucaná River
  - elevation: 3 feet (0.91 m)
- Length: 18.43 mi (29.66 km)
- Basin size: 20.33 mi^{2} (52.7 km^{2})
- Discharge
  - average: 16,000 cu ft/s (450 m^{3}/s)

Basin features
- Progression: Guaraguao; San Patricio; Tibes; Portugués; Machuelo Arriba; Sexto; Quinto; Tercero; Cuarto; San Antón; Playa
- River system: Río Bucaná
- Tributaries
  - right: Chiquito River; Corcho River (Adjuntas)

Río Portugués is a river in the municipality of Ponce, Puerto Rico. In the 19th century, it was also known as Río de Ponce. Twenty-one bridges for motor vehicle traffic span Río Portugués in the municipality of Ponce alone. The river is also known as Río Tibes in the area where it flows through barrio Tibes in the municipality of Ponce. Río Portugués has a length of nearly 30 kilometers (19 mi) and runs south from the Cordillera Central mountain range into the Caribbean Sea. The Portugués is one of the best-known rivers in Ponce because of its prominent zigzagging through the city and its historical significance. The river is historically significant because the city of Ponce had its origins on its banks. It was originally known as Río Baramaya (Baramaya River). It has its mouth at 17°58′51″N 66°37′26″W. This river is one of the 14 rivers in the municipality.

== Origin ==
Río Portugués has its origin in Cerro Guilarte, located the western part of barrio Portugués in the bordering municipality of Adjuntas, (Note: Note that there are two "Barrio Portugues" wards, one in the municipality of Ponce and another in the municipality of Adjuntas. The river has its origin in the Barrio Portugues of the municipality of Adjuntas) just north of Ponce, and drains into the Caribbean Sea after running for some 27.6 kilometers (17.1 mi). (Note: Other sources report lengths of 18.4 miles (29.6km) – (See, for example, HERE, Los Rios. Hojas de Nuestro Ambiente. February 2007: P013. Page 3. Puerto Rico Department of Natural and Environmental Resources. Retrieved 27 November 2013.) and 16.1 miles (25.9km) – (See, for example, HERE, Informe Ecológico de Flora y Fauna, Proyecto Gasoducto del Sur: Peñuelas, Ponce, Juana Díaz, Santa Isabel, Salinas. For: Proyecto Gasoducto del Sur - Peñuelas, Ponce, Juana Díaz, Santa Isabel, Salinas. By: ENSR (Piscataway, NJ) – AEE (Autoridad de Energía Eléctrica). Page 19. Retrieved 26 November 2013.)) The river has a discharge of 16,000 feet^{3}/second. The toponymy, or origin of the name, comes from one of its first settlers, Pedro Rodríguez de Guzman, known as el Portugués ("the Portuguese") because his ancestry was from Portugal. (Note: Another source names this early settler "Pedro Perdomo de Guzmán". It is not clear which of the two names is the correct name, or if his name was perhaps Pedro Rodriguez Perdomo de Guzmán or some other variation. See Historia de Nuestros Barrios: Portugués, Ponce. Rafael Torrech San Inocencio. El Sur a la Vista. Ponce, Puerto Rico. Elsuralavista.com. 14 February 2010.)

== Tributaries ==
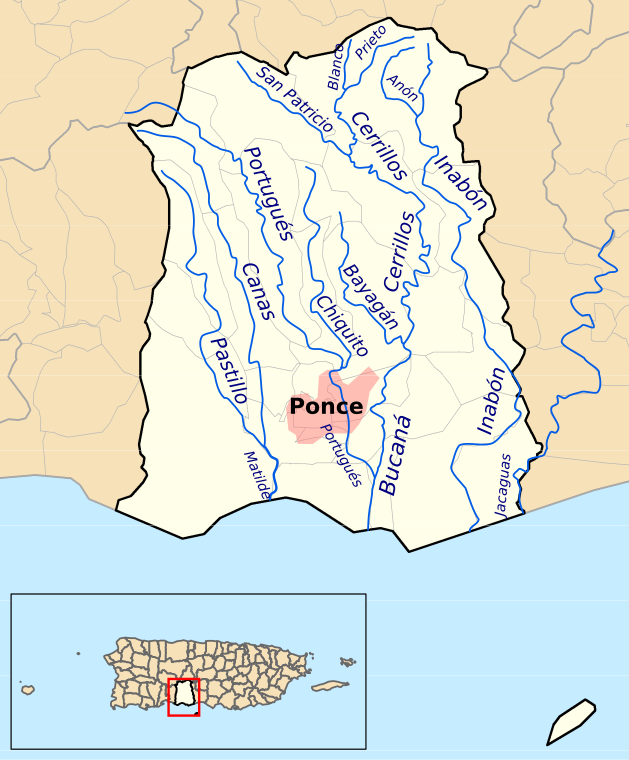
Map showing the location of Río Portugués among the other rivers in the municipality. The area in pink represents the urban zone of the city

Río Chiquito is one of the tributaries of Río Portugués (i.e., Río Chiquito feeds into Río Portugués). In the sectors and sub-barrios that it traverses, the locals call the river by the name of such sector/barrio. Thus names such as Río Cedro, Río Nuez, Río Moscada, and Río Tibes as the unofficial local name of Río Portugués in the sectors known as Cedro, Nuez, Moscada and Tibes.

== Course of the river ==
Starting at its origin in Barrio Portugués, Adjuntas, Río Portugués, as it is known locally, begins to form at an altitude of approximately 2,853 feet (870 m) above sea level. The river then runs in a southerly direction parallel to PR-10 for most of its trajectory, crossing barrios Guaraguao, San Patricio, and Tibes. It brushes barrio Machuelo Arriba on its southwestern corner after it crosses PR-10 just west of the intersection of PR-10 and PR-504, immediately north of the Ponce city limits. From there it enters barrio Machuelo Abajo and continues south crossing Avenida Betances/Avenida Tito Castro (PR-14), at a point about half a mile west of the intersection of routes PR-12 and PR-14. A few hundred feet before the Avenida Betances bridge over Río Portugués in the city of Ponce, the river divides barrios Sexto, located west of the river, and Machuelo Abajo, to the east. It continues south crossing Calle Guadalupe, at which point it divides barrio Quinto to the west and Machuelo Abajo to the east. This point is just west of Club Deportivo de Ponce. Several hundred feet further downstream, at Miguel Pou Boulevard–PR-1 and Puente de los Leones–Tricentennial Park, the river divides barrios Tercero and San Antón. Further downstream, the river runs immediately west of La Ceiba Park on Calle Comercio (route PR-133) in sector Cuatro Calles. After crossing Calle Comercio, Río Portugués divides barrios Cuarto and San Anton, and continues its southerly course towards Avenida Las Américas (PR-163).

The following table summarizes the course of the river in terms of roads crossed. Roads are listed as the river flows from its origin in Ponce's Barrio Guaraguao in the north to the Caribbean Sea in the south (N/A = Data not available):

No.	Barrio	Road	Road's km marker	NBI ID	Bridge name (if any)	Direction (of bridge traffic)	Coordinates	Notes
1	Guaraguao	PR-10	19.1	025961	Unnamed	Both	18°7′13.692″N 66°39′31.6074″W	0.5 km N of PR-515
2	San Patricio	PR-10	14.8	N/A	Unnamed	Both	18°7′13.2594″N 66°39′19.008″W	0.3 km E of PR-10, on Camino Soñadora
3	Tibes	PR-503	N/A	N/A	Unnamed	Both	18°6′9.90″N 66°38′35.0514″W	0.1 km N of Camino Robles; Bridge obliterated by the Portugues Dam
4	Tibes	PR-503	N/A	004901	Unnamed	Both	18°5′51.0354″N 66°38′30.012″W	At entrance to Camino Pastillo; Bridge obliterated by the Portugues Dam
5	Tibes	PR-10	N/A	N/A	Unnamed	Both	18°5′19.14″N 66°38′24.9354″W	0.1 km S of PR-503 in Central Barrio Tibes; Bridge obliterated by the Portugues Dam
6	Tibes	PR-10	9.3	023261	Unnamed	Both	18°2′53.268″N 66°37′30.8994″W	Just north-northwest of Centro Ceremonial Indígena de Tibes in Southern Barrio Tibes
7	Portugués Rural	PR-10	6.9	026711	Unnamed	Both	18°2′16.08″N 66°36′40.9314″W	between PR-503 and PR-504
8	Portugués Rural	PR-504	0.1	022481	Unnamed	Both	18°2′7.332″N 66°36′41.976″W	0.1 km east of PR-503, in Barrio Cantera
9	Machuelo Abajo	PR-14	2.0	018521	Unnamed	Both	18°1′11.244″N 66°36′26.1714″W	PR-14 is aka Ave. Tito Castro in this area (aka, Ave. Betances)
10	Cantera	PR-14R	1.7	022061	La Milagrosa	Both	18°1′2.2794″N 66°36′25.3434″W	PR-14 is aka Calle Guadalupe in this area
11	Tercero	PR-1	126.9	019221	Los Leones	Both	18°0′45.252″N 66°36′27.36″W	0.5 km east of Plaza Las Delicias
12	San Antón	PR-133	1.2	018561	Unnamed	Both	18°0′29.304″N 66°36′23.652″W	At Parque de la Ceiba
13	San Antón	Calle Campos	Street has no km markers	018021	Unnamed	Both	18°0′18.6834″N 66°36′24.444″W	At east end of Calle Campos, in comunidad Bélgica
14	San Anton	PR-163	1.0	010852	Unnamed	WB	18°0′10.8714″N 66°36′25.7754″W	At Av. Las Américas, east of Hospital Dr. Pila
15	San Antón	PR-163	1.0	010862	Unnamed	EB	18°0′10.2954″N 66°36′25.884″W	At Av. Las Américas, east of Hospital Dr. Pila
16	San Antón	PR-12	3.6	018921	Unnamed	Both	17°59′55.896″N 66°36′20.376″W	Av. Santiago de los Caballeros/Av. Malecón, between Av. Las Américas and Ponce By-pass. PR-12 used to be signed PR-14 in this area
17	San Antón	PR-2	229.0	015941	Unnamed	Both	17°59′49.164″N 66°36′6.9474″W	Ponce By-pass 0.4 km east of PR-12
18	San Antón	PR-52	103.7	022691	Unnamed	Both	17°59′8.3394″N 66°35′51.54″W	Flows as Río Bucaná
19	Playa	Av. Caribe	N/A	N/A	Unnamed	Both	17°58′30.8274″N 66°35′56.1474″W	Flows as Río Bucaná
20	Playa	PR-2	227.7	005841	Caracoles	Both	17°59′45.8514″N 66°36′50.544″W	Ponce By-pass, between Av. Hostos and Plaza del Caribe; This was part of the former course of the river
21	Playa	PR-123	3.3	001451	Río Portugués	Both	17°59′36.4914″N 66°36′54.9714″W	Av. Hostos just south of Ponce By-pass; This was part of the former course of the river
22	Playa	PR-585	2.4	002751	Unnamed	Both	17°58′58.512″N 66°37′23.9874″W	Av. Padre Noel by Villa Pesquera; This was part of the former course of the river

== Former and current course ==
For flood control purposes, in the 1970s Río Portugués was diverted by the U.S. Corps of Engineers from emptying directly into the Caribbean Sea at Playa de Ponce to feeding into the Río Bucaná which then empties into the Caribbean Sea. This channelization project started in 1974 and was completed in 1997. It was a multimillion-dollar investment, with just the first phase costing $120 million.

=== Former course ===
The former course of Río Portugués, prior to being diverted and channelized by the U.S. Corps of Engineers in the 1970s, followed from the area just north of Avenida Las Américas/PR-163 in a south-southwesterly fashion crossing Avenida Las Américas immediately east of Hospital Dr. Pila. It then continued south behind the Governmental Center/Puerto Rico Police Ponce Area headquarters, and followed a trajectory almost parallel to Avenida Hostos (PR-123, formerly PR-10). It then crossed PR-2 immediately east of the intersection of Avenida Hostos and Ponce Bypass/PR-2, at the sector called "Caracoles". From there the river used to continue flowing southerly, at one point just edging the area where Plaza del Caribe now stands. This old course then took a sharp westerly turn and crossed Avenida Hostos, at the now historic Puente Río Portugués. From this point it continued running south-southwesterly where it (now, since the newly built PR-52) crossed PR-52. From here the river flowed another one mile (1.6 km) crossing the low-lying area of Barrio La Playa at Avenida Padre Noel before draining into the Caribbean Sea about 30 or 40 yards from Avenida Padre Noel, in the area called Villa Pesquera.

=== Current course ===
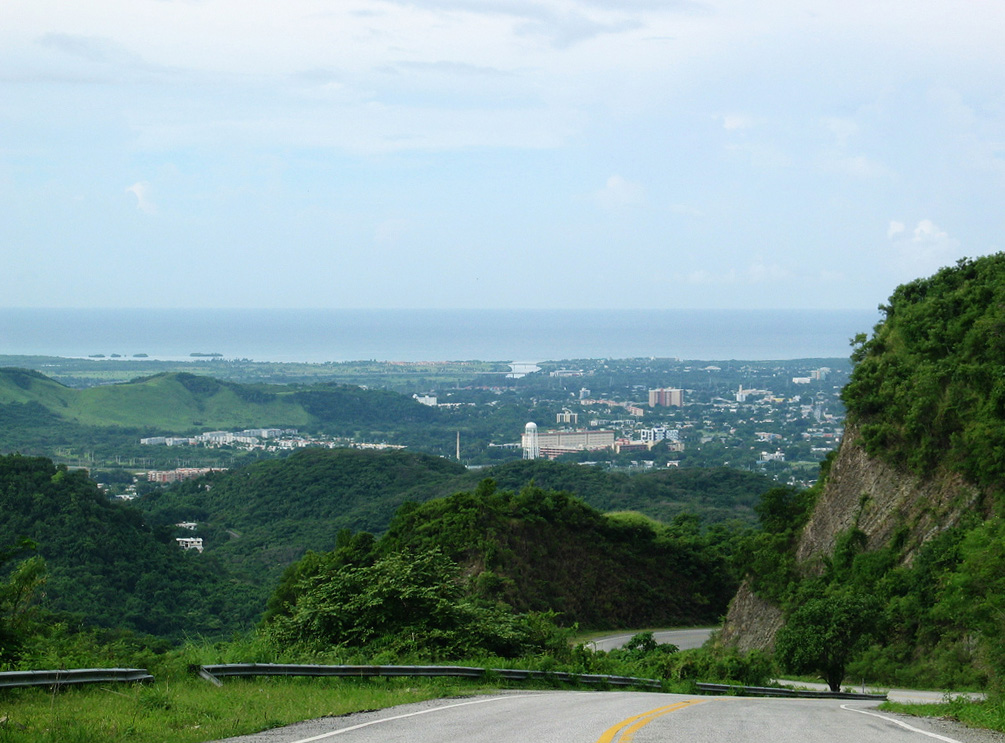
Puerto Rico Highway 139 (PR-139) in Barrio Maraguez, heading South-bound. The Río Portugués canal is visible in the background as it empties into the Caribbean Sea.

Once the U.S. Corps of Engineers canalized Río Portugués as it flowed through the city of Ponce, the Corps also diverted its course from a south-southwesterly course to a south-southeasterly course. This diversion started immediately south of the river's intersection with Avenida Las Américas.

From Avenida Las Américas the river now flows, channelized, in a south-southeasterly after crossing Avenida Las Américas about a quarter of a mile east of Hospital Dr. Pila. After crossing Avenida Las Américas in downtown Ponce, the river comes to the location where in the 1970s it was diverted by the US Corps of Engineers from a southwesterly path to its current southeasterly path. Taking a sharp easterly turn, Río Portugués enters barrio San Antón, and crosses route PR-12/Avenida Malecon about one quarter of a mile north of PR-12's intersection with PR-2. Shortly thereafter the river bends to become southbound and crosses route PR-2, about one quarter of a mile east of PR-2's intersection with PR-12. The river then borders the Julio Enrique Monagas Family Park on the park's western edge until, still canalized, it feeds into Bucaná River about half a mile south of PR-2. The point where Río Portugués feeds into Río Bucaná is about one quarter of a mile north of PR-52 (a.k.a., Autopista Luis A. Ferré) and can be seen from the southbound side of PR-52.

==== Bucaná River ====
After this point Río Portugués is no longer called Río Portugués. It becomes Río Bucaná (Bucaná River) and divides barrios Playa on its western bank and barrio Bucaná on its eastern bank. From there the river continues flowing in southerly course as a single canalized river for half-mile, crossing Autopista Luis A. Ferré/PR-52. Another one mile (1.6 km) of southerly flow and the river empties as a single stream into the Caribbean Sea just east of La Guancha, safely avoiding most low-laying populated areas.

== Uses ==
Today Río Portugués is one of the most popular rivers for swimming in southern Puerto Rico.

== Portugués Dam ==
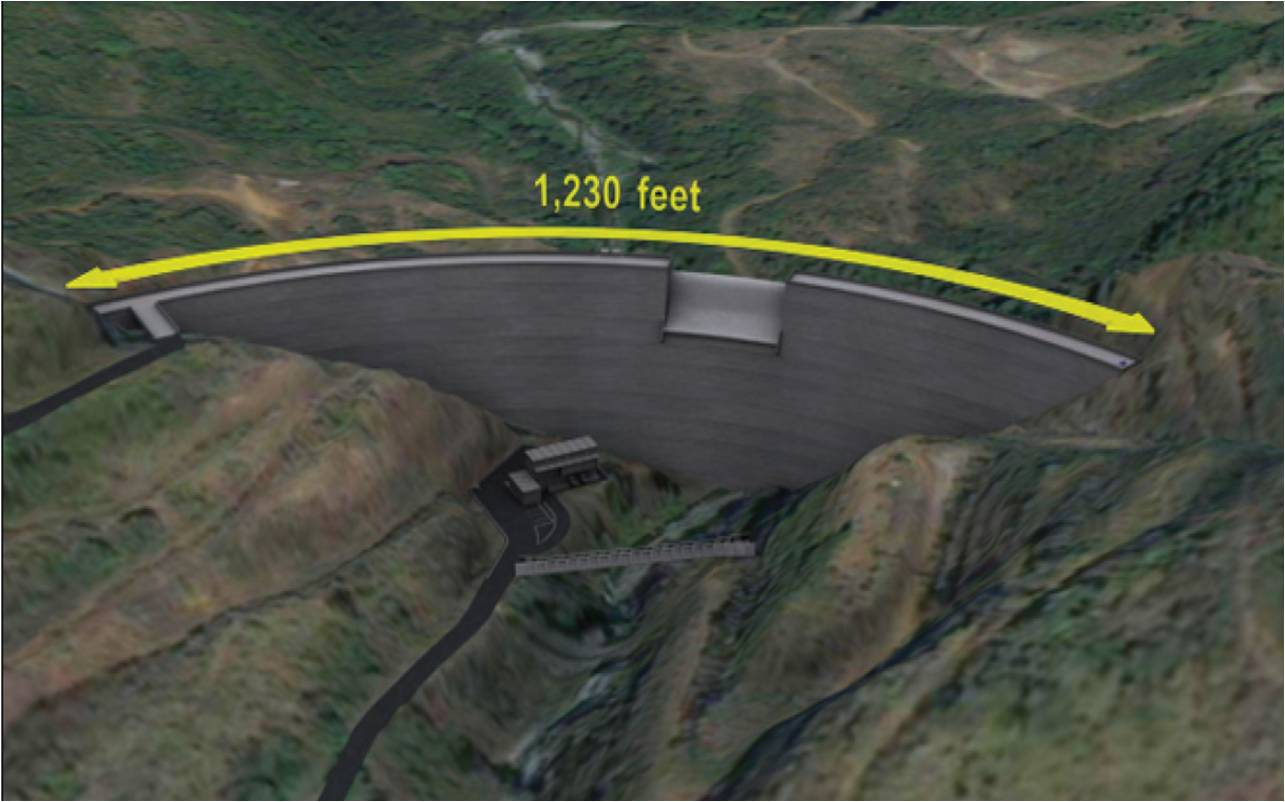
Artistic rendering of Portugues Dam

In 1986, the U.S. Congress approved funding to build the Portugués Dam for Río Portugués about 4 miles (6.4 km) northwest of Ponce. Construction began in April 2008 and, when finished, the dam will be the first roller-compacted concrete thick arch dam built anywhere in U.S. soil by the U.S. Army Corps of Engineers. The Cerrillos Dam over Río Cerrillos was finished in 1992, and had also been approved by Congress in 1986. The cost to build the Portugués Dam is over $192 million.

The dam will consist of a dike of 220 feet high by 1,230 feet wide. It will use 368,000 cubic yards of compressed concrete. As of 22 March 2009, 88 percent of the concrete work had been completed. Its scheduled completion date is 2013. The total investment is $375 million USD.

== Preservation ==
In 1971, Mr. and Mrs. Clark Foreman, owners of the Adjuntas property where Río Portugués originates, granted the development rights of their property in Adjuntas to the Conservation Trust of Puerto Rico, thereby establishing the first scenic and conservation easement in Puerto Rico. The deed of easement and its restrictive covenants protect a 40-acre (160,000 m^{2}) tract of land that includes the headwaters of Río Portugués. Although the title to the land remains with the Foreman family, the easement restricts the use of the land, safeguarding its trees, vegetation, and other natural resources against destruction or alteration in perpetuity. Today, 42 acres (170,000 m^{2}) of Río Portugués scenic easement in Adjuntas's humid forest are a protected entity of the Conservation Trust of Puerto Rico.

== Archeological site ==
An important archeological finding, labeled "PO-29: Jácana", was made on the banks of the river. Artifacts were transferred to Jacksonville, Florida and then returned to a museum in Puerto Rico.

== See also ==
- List of rivers of Puerto Rico
- Ponce, Puerto Rico
- Portugués Dam
- List of rivers of Ponce
