= Urban wild =

Remnant of a natural ecosystem found in an urban area

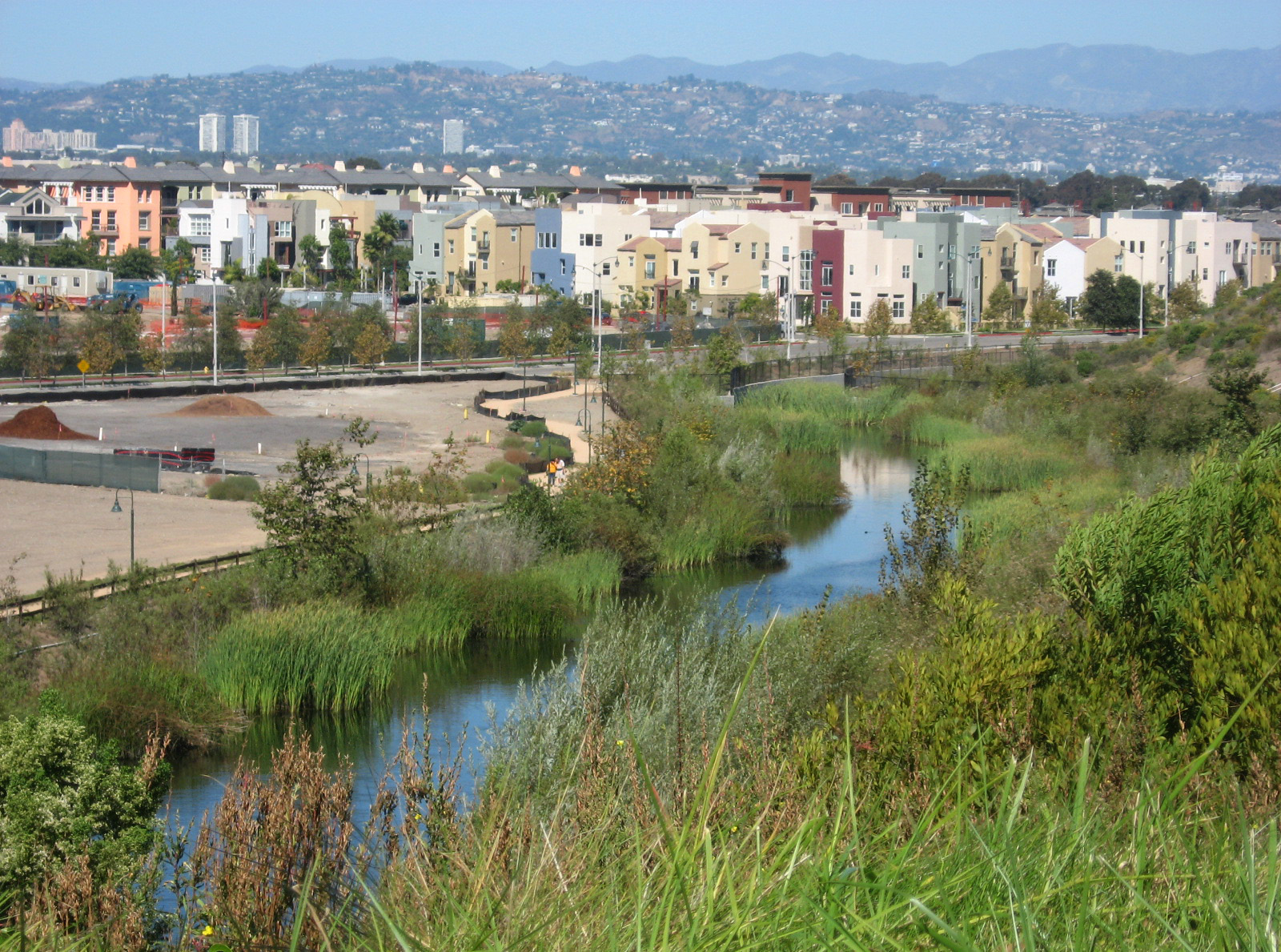
New development on the Ballona Wetlands, Los Angeles, California

An urban wild is a remnant of a natural ecosystem found in the midst of an otherwise highly developed urban area.

One of the most expansive efforts to protect and foster urban wilds is the aptly named "Urban Wilds program" conducted in Boston, which had its start in 1977 on the back of a 1976 report by the Boston Planning & Development Agency (BPDA), formerly the Boston Redevelopment Authority (BRA).

== Utility ==
Urban wilds, particularly those of several acres or more, are often intact ecological systems that can provide essential ecosystem functions such as the filtering of urban run-off, the storing and slowing the flow of stormwater, amelioration of the warming effect of urban development, and generally benefiting local air quality.

Typically, urban wilds are home to native vegetation and animal life as well as some introduced species. Urban wilds are vital to species of migratory birds that have nested in a given area since prior to its urbanization.

== Preservation ==
Without formal protection, urban wilds are vulnerable to development. However, achieving formal protection of a large urban wild can be difficult. Land tenure of a single ecological area can be complex, with multiple public and private entities owning adjacent properties.

Key strategies used in the preservation of urban wilds have included conservation restrictions that keep complex land tenure systems in place while protecting the entire landscape. Public/private partnerships have also been successful in protecting urban wilds.

The urban wilds prioritized by municipalities tend to be partial wetlands that perform a range of ecological services while contributing to the biological diversity of the region.

== Passive parks ==
There is some discussion about whether natural areas that are not at an appropriate scale to perform significant ecosystem services should instead be categorized as passive parks as opposed to urban wilds. Smaller urban wilds are used for passive recreation and have less value to the city in terms of enhancing ecosystem function.
