= Vigia =

Vigia or Vigía may refer to:

== Places ==
- Vigia (mountain), a mountain on the island of Boa Vista, Cape Verde
- Vigia, Pará, a municipality in the State of Pará, Brazil
- Vigía del Fuerte, a town in Colombia
- Finca Vigía, the house of Ernest Hemingway near Havana, Cuba
- Cruceta del Vigía, a hilltop cross in Ponce, Puerto Rico
- El Vigía, the shire town of Alberto Adriani Municipality, Venezuela
- Cerro del Vigía, a historically important hill in the northern section of the city of Ponce, Puerto Rico.

== Other ==
- Atlético El Vigía, an association football club based in El Vigía
- Vigia, a synonym of the plant genus Plukenetia
- Vigia (nautical), a warning on a navigational chart indicating a possible hazard of unknown exact location
