= List of mountains in Ponce, Puerto Rico =

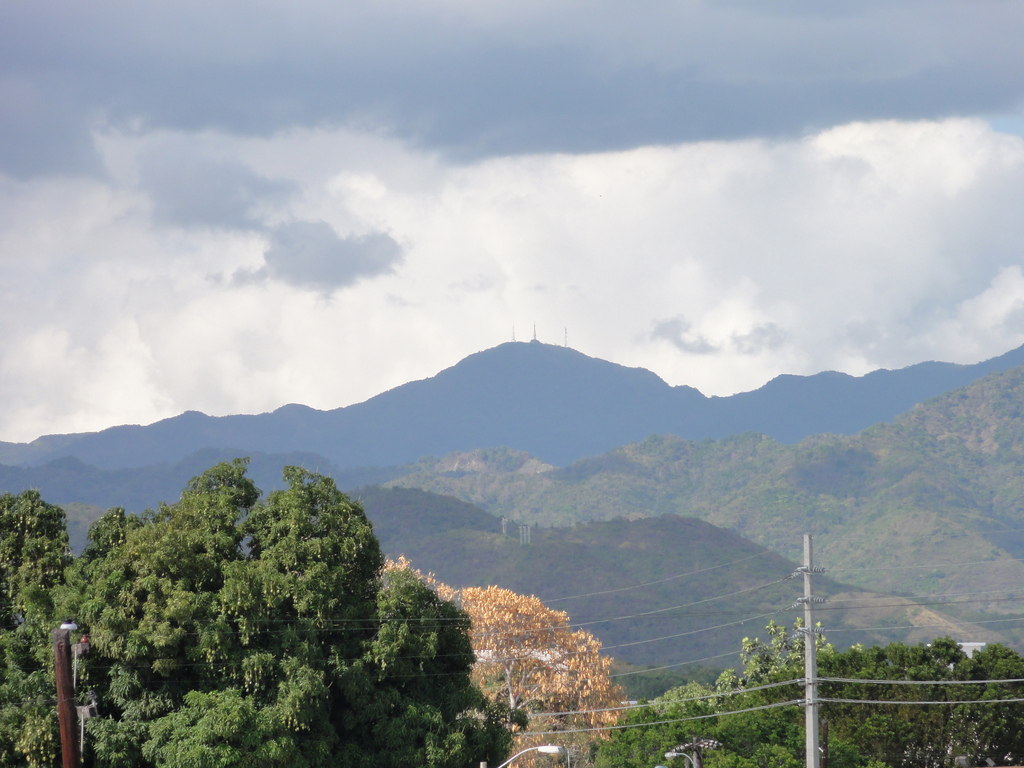
Cerro de Punta, Puerto Rico's tallest mountain, as seen from Museo de Arte de Ponce

This list of mountains in Ponce, Puerto Rico, consists of both hills, mountains, and similarly named geographic features with a summit in the municipality of Ponce, Puerto Rico.

== Mountain list summary table ==
No.	Name	Height	Location	Type	Comment	Photo
1	Cerro de Punta	1,338 meters (4,390 ft)	Anón	Cerro	Highest mountain in Puerto Rico	
2	Peñón de Ponce	101 meters (331 ft)	Canas	Peñon	Next to Barrio Encarnación, Peñuelas; easily visible from PR-2 westbound at the Las Cucharas sector	
3	Cerro del Vigía	139 meters (456 ft)	Portugués Urbano	Cerro	Location of Cruceta del Vigia and other tourist attractions. Prominently located just north of the city of Ponce	
4	Cerro Los Negrones	121 meters (397 ft)	Sabanetas & Machuelo Abajo	Cerro	Visible from PR-52, while traveling through Barrio Sabanetas, between PR-1 and PR-10	
5	Cerro del Diablo	681 meters (2,234 ft)	Tibes	Cerro	0.5 miles (2,600 ft) east of Hacienda Burenes/PR-503 km 1.9	
6	Monte Jayuya	1,311 meters (4,301 ft)	Anón	Monte	Shared with Barrio Veguitas and Barrio Saliente, Municipality of Jayuya	
7	Cerro Maravilla	1,203 meters (3,947 ft)	Anón	Cerro	Next to Barrio Saliente, Jayuya	
8	Cerro Santo Domingo	611 meters (2,005 ft)	Maraguez & Anón	Cerro	0.75 miles (4,000 ft) NNE of the (easterly) bridge over Rio Cerrillos on PR-139 in Barrio Maraguez	
9	Cerro Agustinillo	581 meters (1,906 ft)	Real	Cerro	Next to Barrio Collores, Juana Diaz	
10	Monte La Mesa	531 meters (1,742 ft)	Anón	Monte	Next to Barrio Real, Ponce	
11	Pico Pinto	621 meters (2,037 ft)	Machuelo Arriba & Maraguez	Pico	-	
12	Cerro El Gato	252 meters (827 ft)	Portugués	Cerro	Next to Machuelo Arriba	
13	Monte Marqueño	626 meters (2,054 ft)	Tibes, Guaraguao, & Magueyes	Monte	Located at junction of barrios Tibes, Guaraguao, and Magueyes	

== Gallery ==
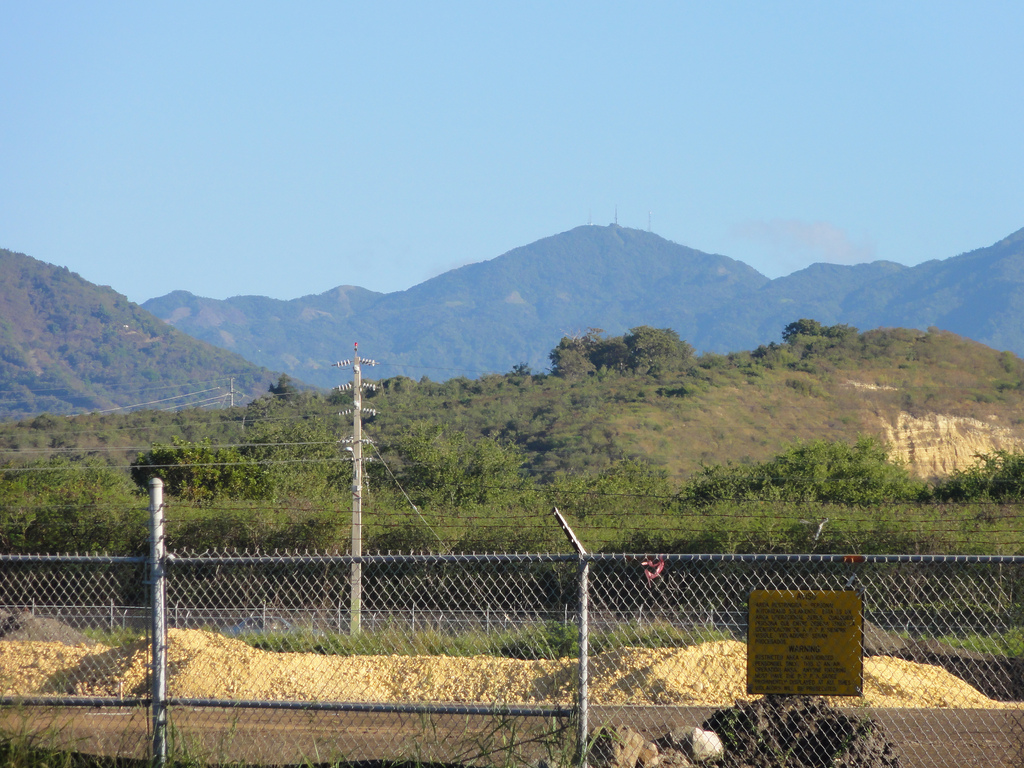
Cerro de Punta as seen from Mercedita Airport

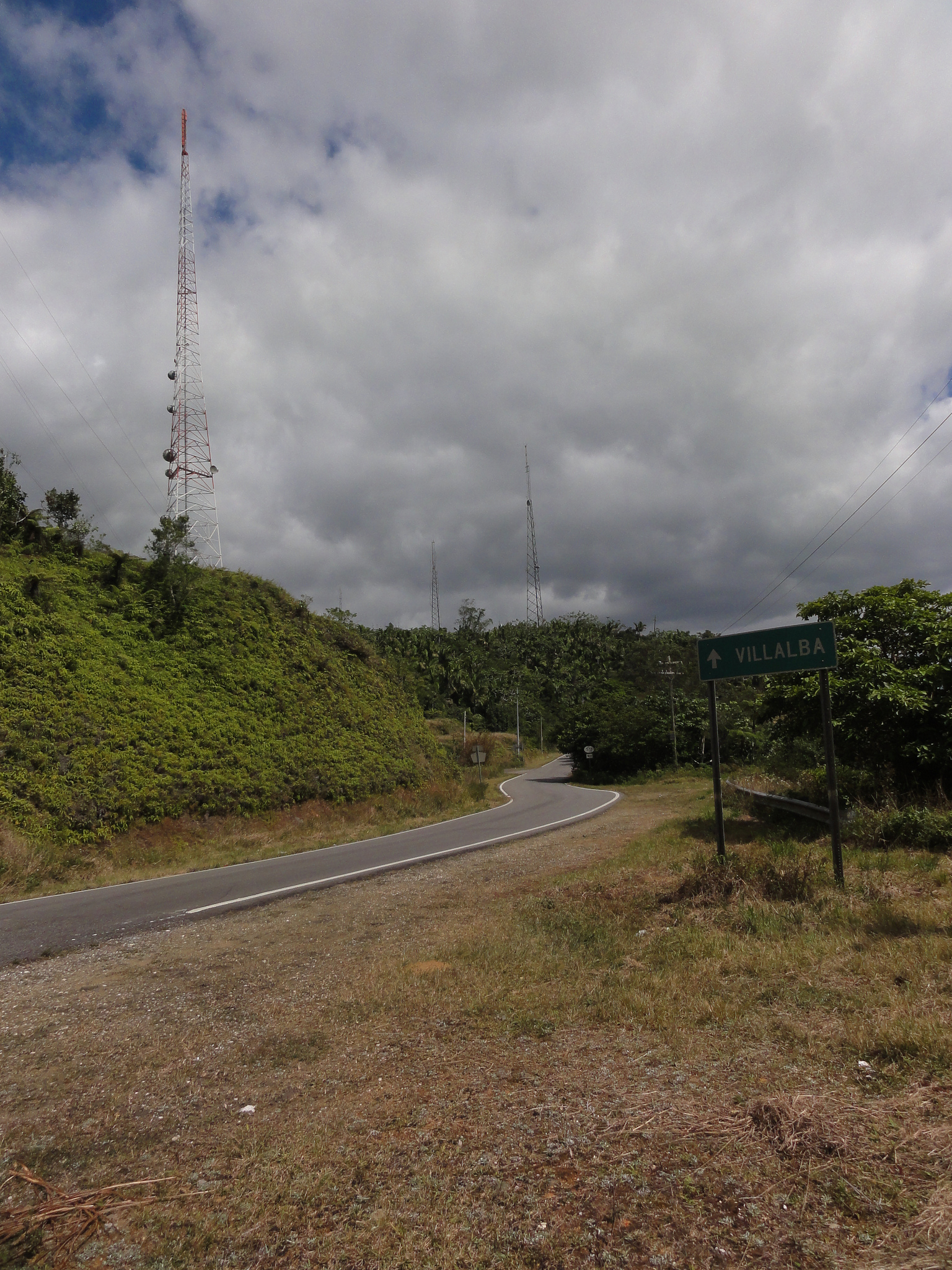
Road PR-143 East, near PR-577 to Cerro Maravilla

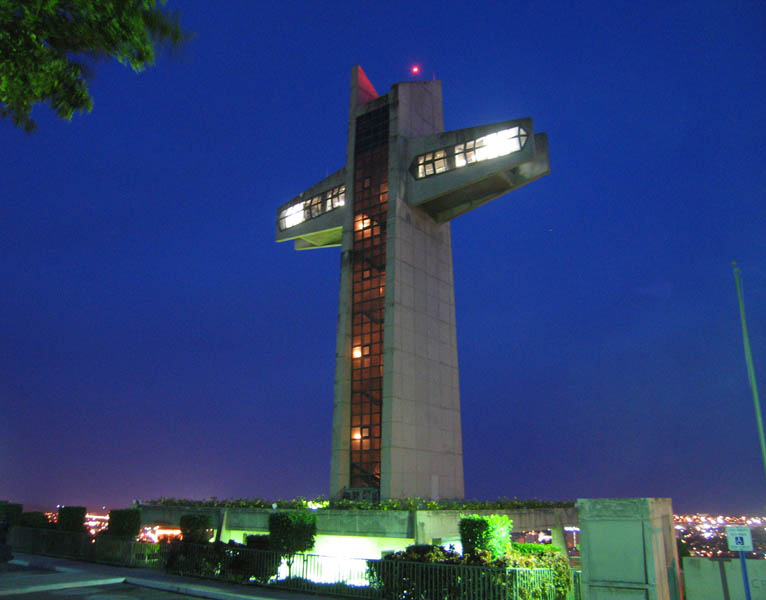
Cruceta del Vigia atop Cerro del Vigia

== See also ==
- List of islands of Ponce, Puerto Rico
