= Agricultural museum =

Museum of agricultural history and heritage

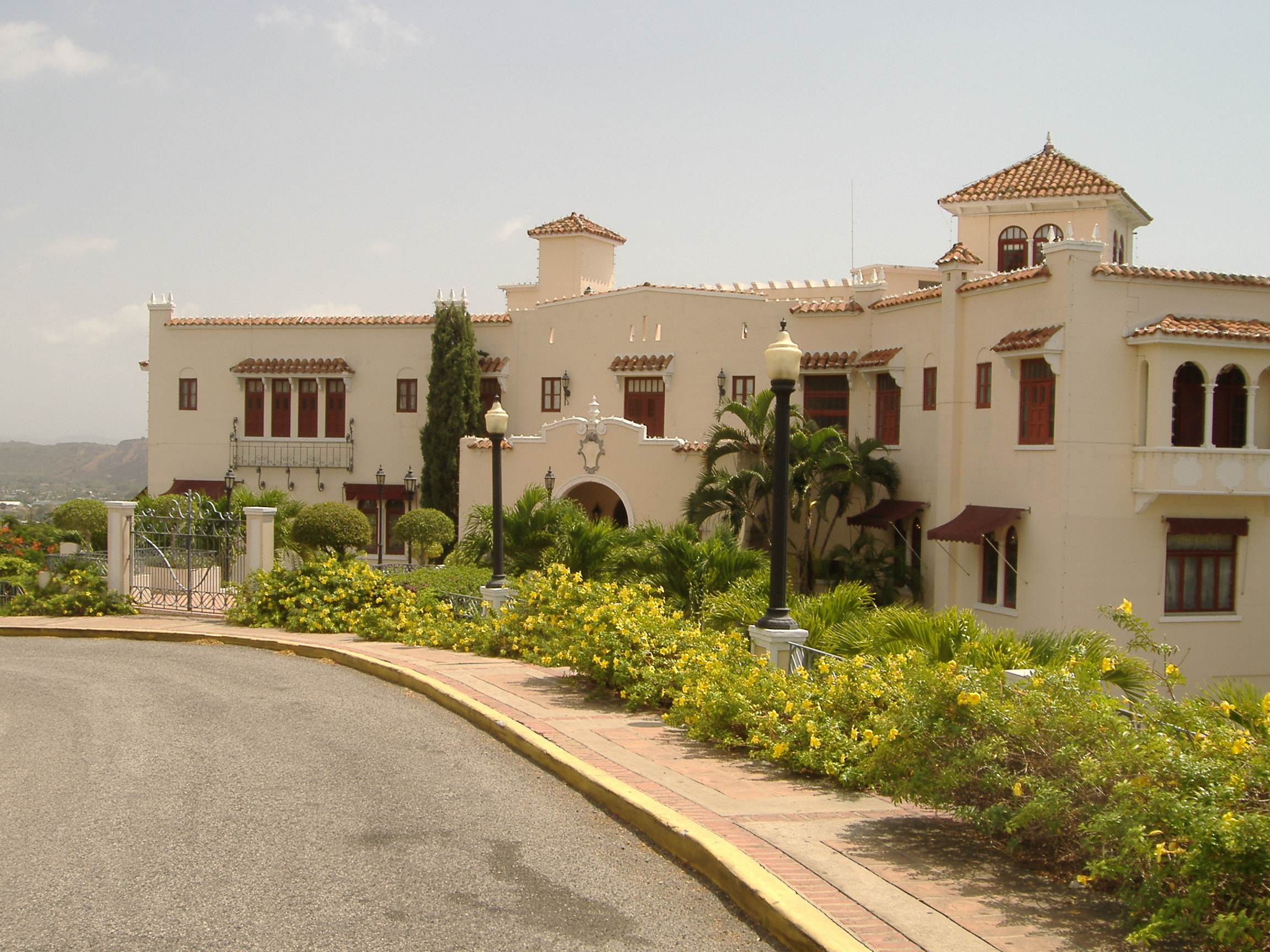
Museo Castillo Serralles is an agricultural museum in Ponce, Puerto Rico, that showcases the sugar cane and its derivative rum industry

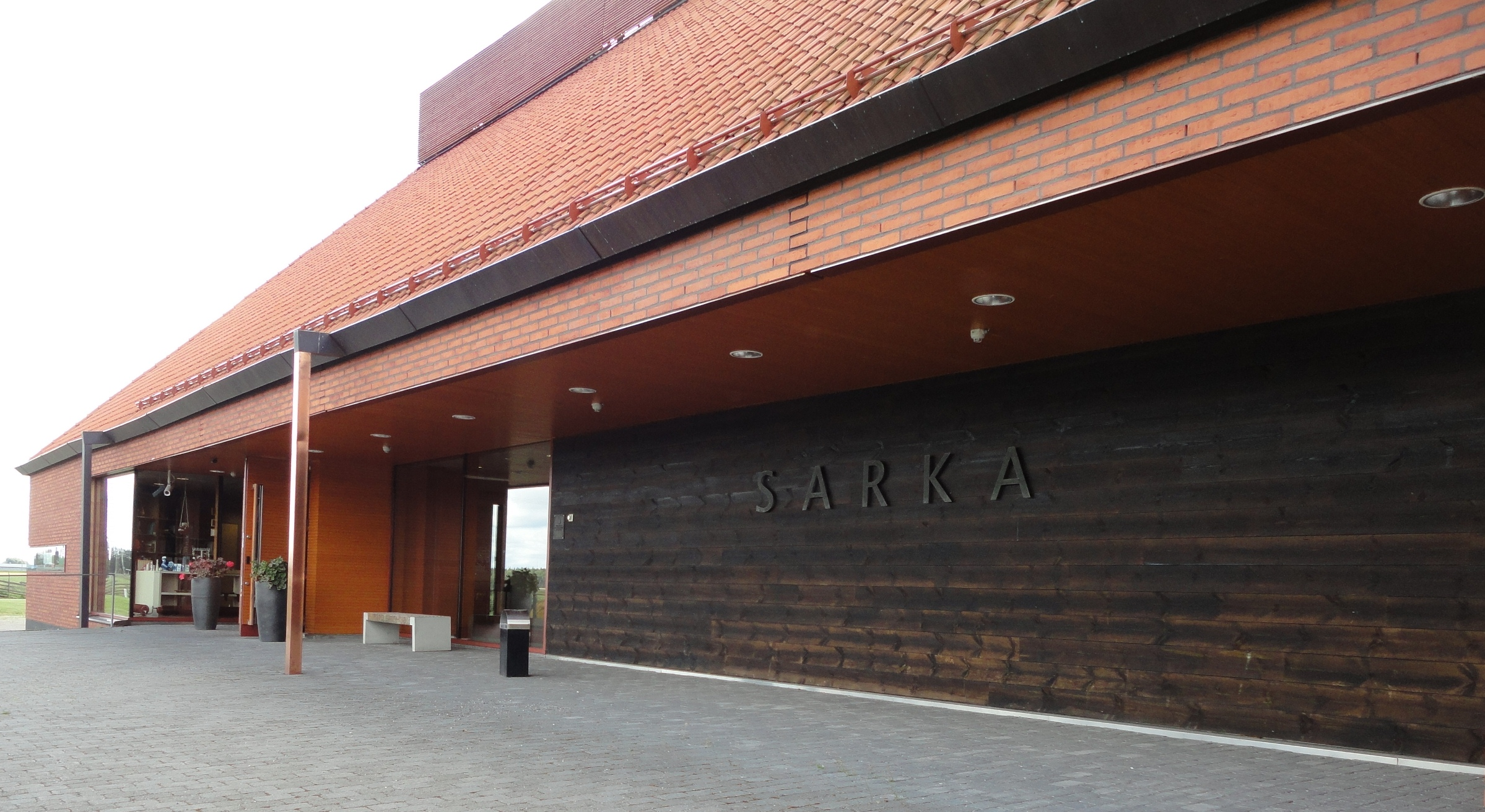
Sarka is an agricultural museum in Loimaa, Finland, that presents 3,000 years of Finnish agriculture

An agricultural museum is a museum dedicated to preserving agricultural history and heritage. It aims to educate the public on the subject of agricultural history, their legacy and impact on society. To accomplish this, it specializes in the display and interpretation of artifacts related to agriculture, often of a specific time period or in a specific region. They may also display memorabilia related to farmers or businesspeople who impacted society via agriculture (for example, size of the land cultivated as compared to other farmers) or agricultural advances (for example, technology implementation).

An agricultural museum is said to be diachronic if it presents the entire narrative associated with subject of agriculture within its walls, or to be synchronic if it limits its displays to a single experience.

== Types of agricultural museums ==
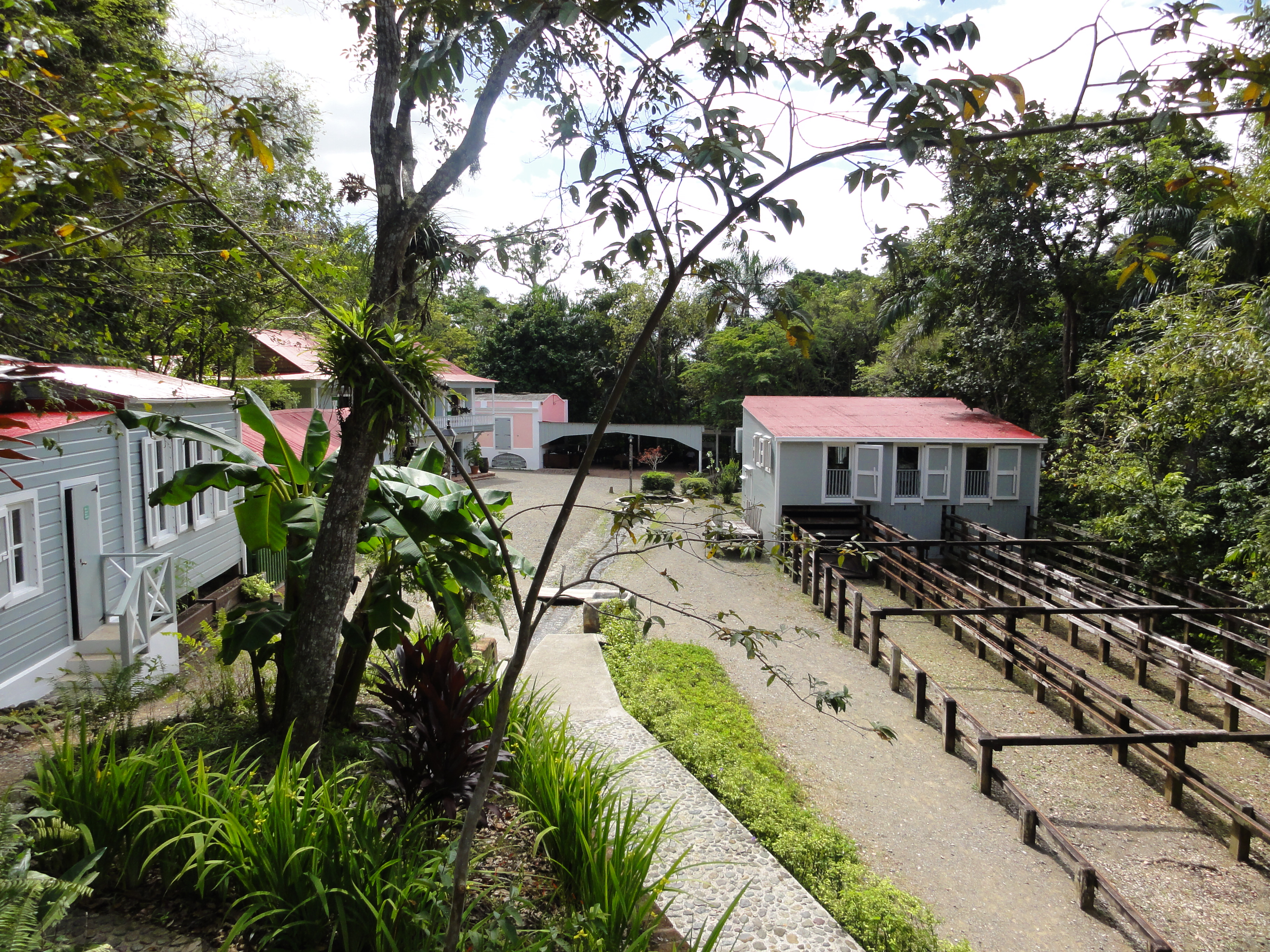
Farm museums, like this one housing the only pre-Scotch type turbine known to exist, are a subcategory of agricultural museums

Agricultural museums often specialize in one or more of three aspects of the farm-food process. Those specializing on the crop cultivation and farming aspect of agriculture are known as farm museums. These would include farm museums like Barleylands Farm Museum, Fenimore Farm & Country Village, and Aulestad. Others, like Balmoral Grist Mill Museum in Balmoral Mills, Nova Scotia, focus on the production aspect of the process; many mill museums, including Frohnauer Hammer, Mazonovo, and the oldest commercial flour mill in North America, Moulin du Petit-Pré, fall into this group. Still others, like the Tao Heung Foods of Mankind Museum in Fo Tan, Shatin, Hong Kong, the Potato Museum, and the Spam Museum, are focused on the post-production and food-consumption aspect of agriculture.

Other agricultural museums, like the Kregel Windmill Museum, the Irish Agricultural Museum, and Danmarks Traktormuseum, display agricultural machinery. Agricultural museums may further specialize in educating the public about one single crop or they may be multi-themed, covering several or many crop types. For example, sugar production is the only subject matter of focus at the sugar museums of Berlin Sugar Museum (the world's oldest), Taiwan Sugar Museum, and Museo de la Caña y el Ron. Most mill museums are non-operational, but the Watson's Mill is a rarity as a working museum in Manotick, Ontario, Canada, still in operation.

== Scope of the galleries ==
Some agricultural museums, like Canada Agriculture and Food Museum, present agriculture in general as it relates to an entire country, while others, like the Tao Heung Foods of Mankind Museum in Hong Kong, aim to cover the entire scope of agriculture of the human civilization throughout history. Still others, like Sugar Cane and Rum Museum present the agriculture of a particular farming species and focused on a particular food and end product.

== Open air vs. indoor museums ==
In terms of the venues for these museums, some agricultural museums are located in former mills, abandoned buildings, or warehouses, such as Alexander & Baldwin Sugar Museum. Other museums, on the other hand, are housed in structures specifically designed to accommodate an agricultural museum, such as Thailand's Golden Jubilee Museum of Agriculture. The museum architecture in such agricultural museums has been specifically designed and tailored to the purpose for that space.

Agriculture museums can also be located in the open air, such as Poland's National Museum of Agriculture. Overall, open-air agricultural museums abound: other examples of open-air based agricultural museums are International Wind- and Watermill Museum, Church Farm Museum, and Julita Abbey.

Some open-air agricultural museums may present the history of how entire villages subsisted from their agriculture and may include many buildings spread over many acres; this is the case with the Kommern Open Air Museum. Other agricultural museums are strictly indoors-based and occupy just one building, such as the Agricultural Museum of Malaysia.

== Animal vs. crop agriculture ==
Some farm museums deal with the farming of animals as opposed to crops. This is the case of Lithuanian Museum of Ancient Beekeeping.

== Ownership, size and exhibitions ==
As for ownership and operation, some agricultural museums, such as Tao Heung Foods of Mankind Museum, in Hong Kong, and the Adatepe Olive Oil Museum in Turkey, are privately owned. Others, like the Agricultural Museum of Egypt, in Cairo, are a publicly owned national patrimony.

== See also ==
- Ennigaldi-Nanna's museum
- International Council of Museums
- International Museum Day (18 May)
- List of museums
- .museum
- Museum education
- Museum fatigue
- Museum label
- Types of museum
