= Hotel Ponce Intercontinental =

Abandoned hotel in Ponce, Puerto Rico

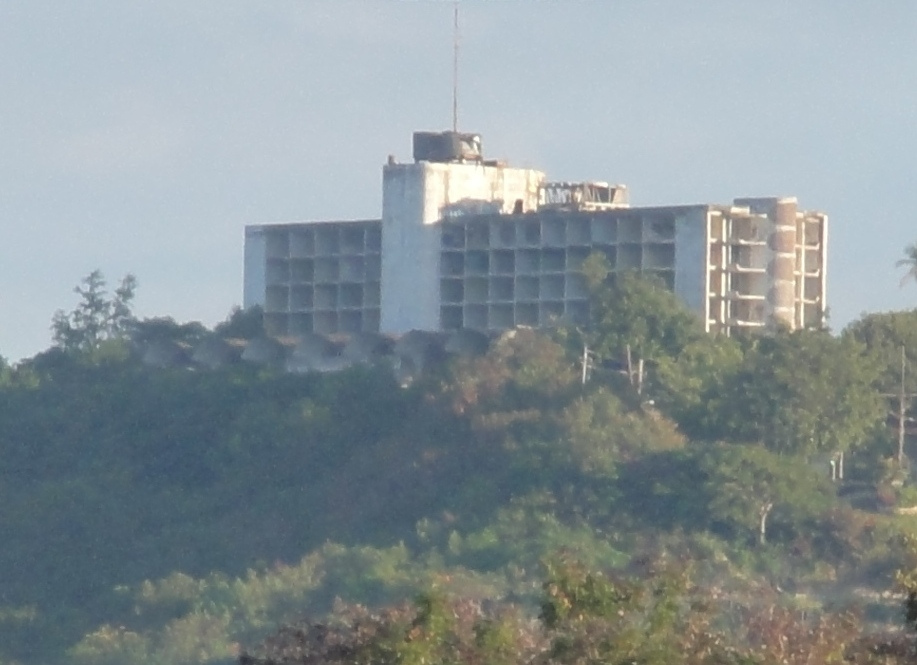
- Former Hotel Ponce Intercontinental over the El Vigia Hill in Barrio Portugues Urbano, Ponce, Puerto Rico
- Interactive map of the Hotel Ponce Intercontinental area

General information
- Location: Paseo de la Cruceta; Ponce, Puerto Rico
- Coordinates: 18°1′17.4″N 66°37′14.59″W
- Opening: 1 February 1960
- Closed: 31 May 1975
- Owner: Misla Hospitality Group
- Operator: Inter·Continental Hotels (1960–1975); Marriott International (scheduled to start on December 2026)

Technical details
- Floor count: 7

Design and construction
- Architect: William B. Tabler Architects

Other information
- Number of rooms: 170
- Currently under reconstruction

The Hotel Ponce Intercontinental (also known as "El Ponce") is an abandoned hotel with a still existing structure at Cerro del Vigía in Ponce, Puerto Rico. The structure is considered a historic landmark and a national icon in the city of Ponce and Puerto Rico. The property is currently owned by Misla Hospitality Group, a family of local Ponce investors who bought it from CBC Development. Its architecture is classical modern. When it opened, in 1960, it became the first modern hotel in the city. The structure is currently under reconstruction and is expected to reopen under the Marriott's Tribute Portfolio brand.

== Location and features ==
The hotel is located in the northern section of the city of Ponce, on a hill just north of El Vigia Hill, behind Cruceta del Vigía and Castillo Serralles. The hotel had a large circular outdoor swimming pool, a dining room named Salón Ponciana, a cocktail bar named Bar Coquí, and a casual restaurant called El Cafetal. The hotel also had a casino that operated until 1973. On top of the hotel, WRIK-TV had its transmission antenna. The hotel is on a lot measuring approximately 25 cuerdas (roughly 25 acres). The land area is 22.5 cuerdas.

== Design ==
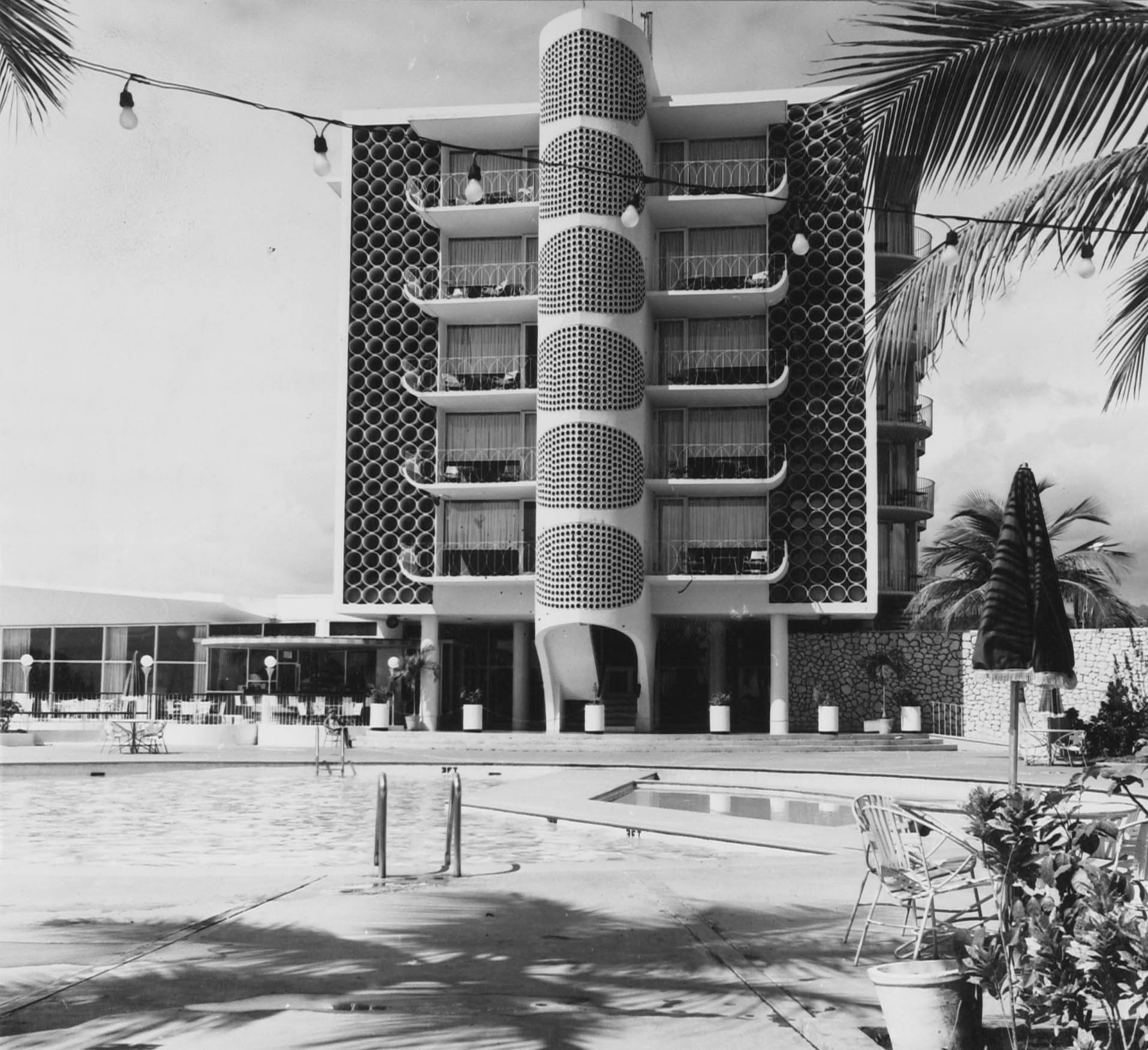
One of the hotel's façades in 1964

The hotel was designed in 1957–58 by American architect William B. Tabler, FAIA. Tabler, whose offices were in New York City, designed hotels worldwide for the Statler chain, Hilton, and Intercontinental.

Tabler designed the Ponce Intercontinental in a modern style with ample space for cross ventilation and light, interior details, and quasi-futuristic traits. The design takes advantage of the location of the building for natural ventilation and exposure to large and spacious panoramic views of the Caribbean Sea from the top sector of the El Vigia Hill in the municipality of Ponce, Puerto Rico.

The architectural design of this hotel is simple but consistent with a curvilinear theme which is unique in Puerto Rico. The concrete shells that housed the restaurant, and activities rooms are geared to take advantage of large open spaces with majestic views of the Caribbean Sea. The use of ornamental roofs is typical of modern architecture of the mid-1950s era.

== History ==
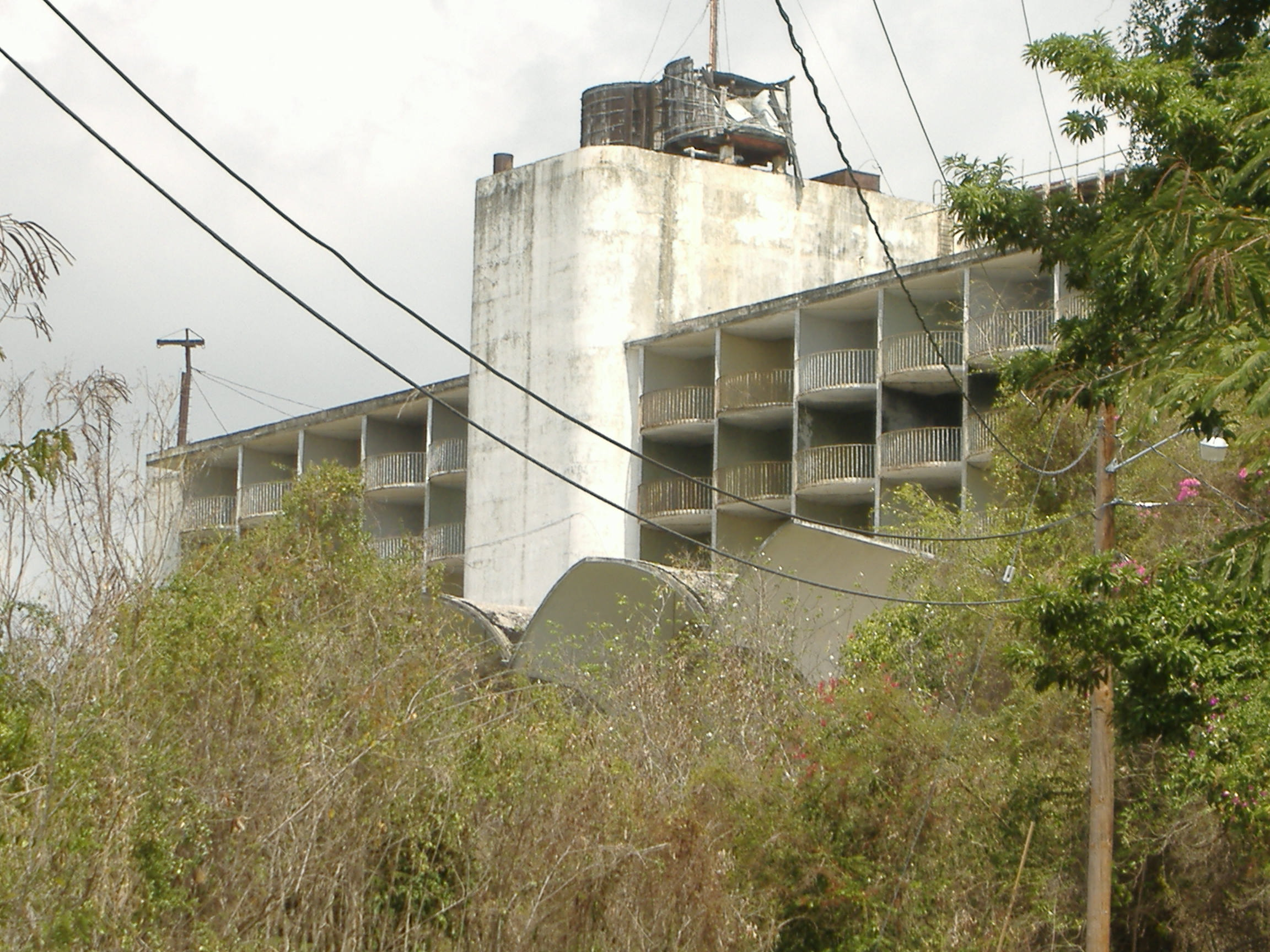
2007 photo of the front facade of the derelict structure

The first stone of the hotel was placed on January 6, 1958, under the project name “Hotel El Ponceño”, and the hotel opened as a luxury hotel on 1 February 1960. The cost of the construction of the hotel was US$3.75 million ($42 million today). The Hotel operated for 15 years (from 1960 to 1975) and was of particular importance in the collective memory of the Ponce's popular society in the 1960s through the 1970s. The hotel was a bustling center of entertainment that stood out as a center of large musical events of those years. The Ponce Intercontinental is remembered for being the birthplace of great artistic, social and political events of its time. Celebrities, such as Chucho Avellanet, Iris Chacon, El Gran Combo de Puerto Rico, Celia Cruz, Marco Antonio Muñiz, José José, Sandro de America, Camilo Sesto, Raphael, and others, stayed or performed at the hotel.

== Closing ==
The hotel's definitive closure was first announced on April 21, 1975, slated for May 30, due to the hotel's profound economical crisis as losses were accumulating over $1.7 million ($10 millions today). The hotel's management were disposed to accept offers to avoid the hotel's closure, requiring $1 million ($6 millions today) investment. A group of local Ponce investors were interested in leasing the hotel to continue operating, once Inter·Continental Hotels ceases operations.

However, the interested group didn't have the necessary economical resources to continue operating the hotel, and the hotel was finally closed on May 31, 1975, at 11 pm, a day after the anticipated date, losing over 145 jobs. 7 guests were staying at the hotel on the last day of operations. After the hotel's closure, Inter·Continental Hotels continued in charge of the building's maintenance until 1980.

The hotel's location, high costs, labor conflicts, and the lack of appropriated road access were considered factors for the hotel's economical problems that caused the closure. The hotel's only access road was through a narrow one-way, one-lane alley in a financially deprived neighborhood north of the city. The lack of touristic promotion outside San Juan Metropolitan Area and the hotel's bad administration were also blamed for the hotel's failure.

== Re-construction ==
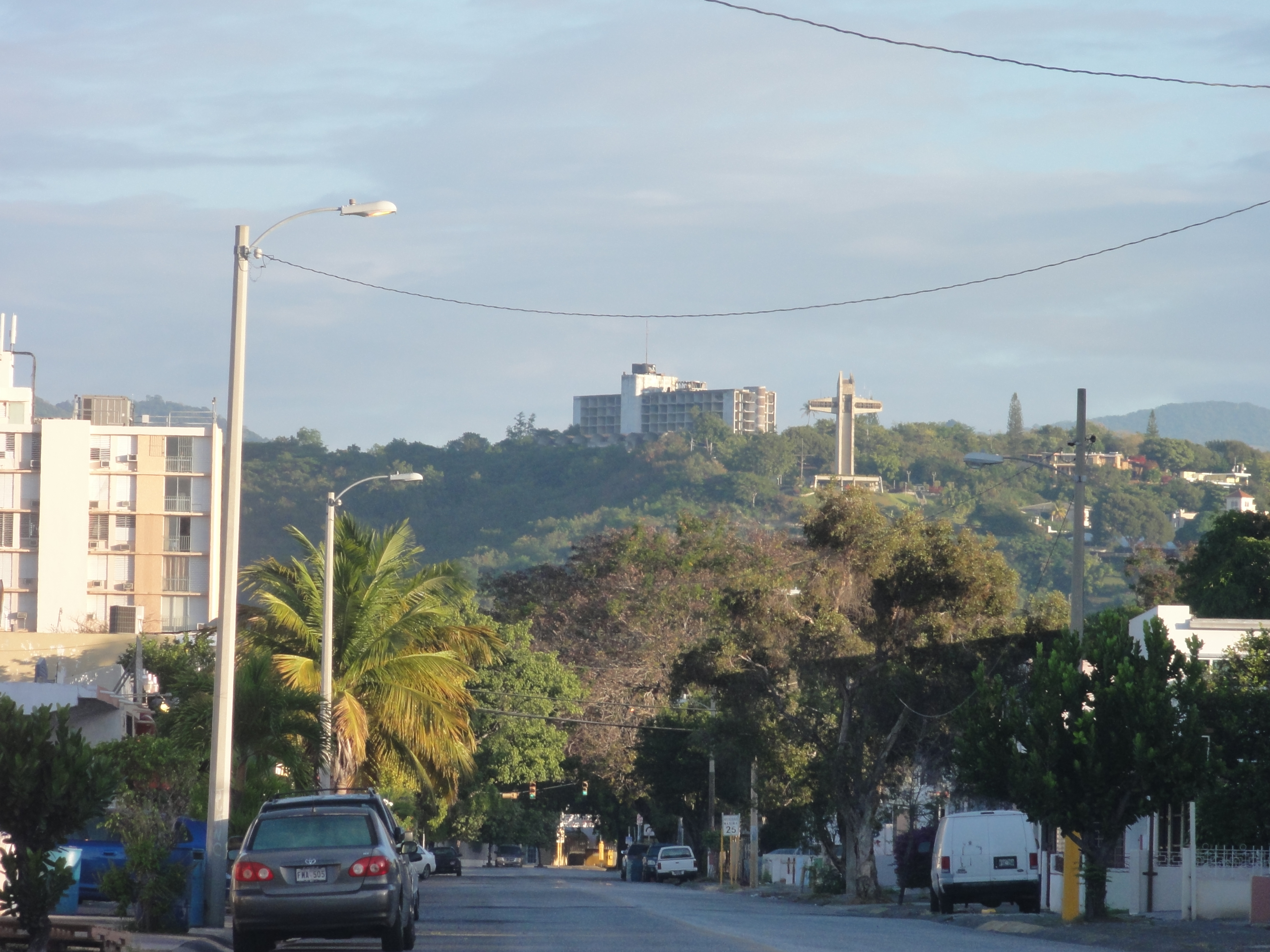
January 2012 photo of the former hotel, as seen from the city of Ponce

In 1979, the mayor of Ponce José G. Tormos Vega announced that the hotel would reopen under new owners for the 1979 Pan American Games, which was held in San Juan, Puerto Rico. However, the hotel didn't reopen and in 1981, a group of Puerto Rican and American investors were reportedly looking into purchasing the property. No other developments were subsequently reported.

In 1985, and under Government of Puerto Rico guidelines, Puerto Rico's Compañia de Fomento Industrial ("PRIDCO") decided to buy the structure on 7 November 1985, with the goal of remodeling it, expanding its facilities, and providing the city of Ponce with world-class accommodations. PRIDCO commissioned the architectural firm of Pablo Quinones & Associates to initiate investigations and studies on the condition of the main structure with the intention of upgrading it to modern codes. The design team generated its recommendations, which were delivered to the PRIDCO. Simultaneously, the team traveled to New York City in 1985–86, where it located the original plans at the offices of William B. Tabler. As a design strategy for its architectural features, they decided to remodel the essence of its main structure and proposed an enlargement to accommodate a modern convention center within the premises.

On 7 October 1985, as a result of the landslide in Mameyes, the hotel was used as temporary accommodation for people affected by the floods. As the time of the relocation of the affected tenants became longer than anticipated, plans to enlarge and re-model the hotel were abandoned.

In 1999, George Philip Rivera, a local businessman and entrepreneur, became interested in buying and in remodeling property, and have it operate as El Vigía Hotel & Casino. He envisioned the construction of villas, a multilevel parking garage and banquet facilities. However, by 2001 the sale had fallen through and PRIDCO put the property for sale again. CBC Development won the auction for the property and planned to demolish the structure and build a 365-unit walk-up apartment complex.

In 2006, PRIDCO sold the property to CBC Development, however, CBC changed the plans. It then planned to remodel the hotel, build an 80-room condo hotel, a 15,200 ft. square convention center, and 80 villas. The project was named Vista Magna Hotel & Resort. Two years later, however, in 2008, due to the estructural damage deemed too extensive, CBC decided it would instead demolish the structure and build a new hotel having some elements of the nostalgic original building. In any event, neither repairs nor demolition took place and, in 2012, CBC Development along with the Integrated Development Commission of the South Region from the House of Representatives of Puerto Rico began considering the possibility to rehabilitate the structure to operate as a senior citizen housing complex. The plan called for 126 senior housing units.

By 2016, however, a new player surfaced. Juan Jose Acosta won approval to convert the building into a housing complex for homeless youth members of the LGBT community.

In 2018, Grupo Misla Villalba, owners of Hotel Meliá, bought the property from CBC with plans to rehabilitate the structure as a hotel.

On 28 July 2020, Misla Hospitality Group announced that the structure will be rehabilitated to convert it into the Puerto Rico's first Tribute Portfolio by Marriott International. The hotel was preliminarily expected to open in March 2022 after an investment of $20 million. It would be the second under the Marriott flag in Ponce, after the Aloft hotel located on the Ponce Bypass and PR-12.

On March 26, 2025, the Misla Hospitality Group announced they received the financial backing for hotel's reconstruction. The hotel is currently (May 2025) scheduled to reopen by December 2026 after a $35 million investment, and will operate under the name "The Continental". It will feature 168 rooms in the 1960-built structure, 32 swim-out suites, 20 villas, convention center, as well as common areas. The groundbreaking for the reconstruction was taken place on May 9, 2025.

== See also ==
- History of the Autonomous City of Ponce
- Intercontinental-Hotels
- List of hotels in Ponce, Puerto Rico
