= List of hotels in Ponce, Puerto Rico =

This is a list of hotels in Ponce, Puerto Rico, Puerto Rico's second largest city outside the San Juan metropolitan area. The list includes the number of guest rooms and floors. When a hotel consists of more than one building structure, the number of floors given is that of the tallest structure.

== Hotel list summary table ==
The following table lists hotels by their number of rooms. A listing sorted by any of the other fields can be obtained by clicking on the header of the field. For example, clicking on "Barrio" will sort hospitals by their barrio location.

No.	Name	Photo	Type	Barrio	Location	Year Current Structure Built	Year Opened	Floors	Rooms	Architectural style
1	Hotel Bélgica		Boutique Hotel	Segundo	C. Villa EB at Plaza Degetau	1872	1872	2	20	Spanish colonial
2	The Fox Hotel		Thematic boutique hotel	Segundo	C. Isabel WB at Plaza Muñoz Rivera	1931	2019	2	50	Art Deco
3	Hotel Ponce Plaza & Casino		Boutique hotel	Segundo	C. Union and C. Reina	1882	2009	5	70	Spanish colonial
4	Hotel Meliá		Boutique Hotel	Tercero	C. Cristina and C. Marina	1960	1895	5	73	Spanish colonial
5	Hotel Solace by the Sea (former Quality Inn)		Seaside hotel	Canas	PR-2 EB at Las Cucharas	1965	2017	2	102	Modern
6	Hotel Holiday Inn & Tropical Casino		Casino hotel	Canas	PR-2 WB at El Tuque	1975	1975	5	116	Modern
7	Hotel Caribe (former Howard Johnson's)		Motel	Sabanetas	PR-1 WB at Curva Turpo	1989	1989	2	120	Modern
8	Hotel Hampton by Hilton Ponce (UC)		Casino hotel	Machuelo Abajo	Dr. Hector Rodriguez Estapé Blvd. EB	UC	UC	8	130	Modern
9	Hotel Aloft Ponce & Casino		Casino hotel	San Antón	Ponce By-pass Km 228.9 WB	2021	2021	6	152	Modern
10	The Continental, A Tribute Portfolio Hotel (former Hotel Ponce Intercontinental) (UR)		Resort hotel	Portugués Urbano	Paseo de la Cruceta	1960	UR	8	200	Modern
11	Hotel Ponce Hilton Golf & Casino Resort		Resort hotel	Playa	Ave. Caribe EB	1992	1992	5	255	Modern

Key:
C. = Calle (street)
NB = Northbound
SB = Southbound
WB = Westbound
EB = Eastbound
UC = Under construction
UR = Under reconstruction
Unk = Unknown
N/A = Not applicable
