= New York Hilton Midtown =

Hotel in Manhattan, New York

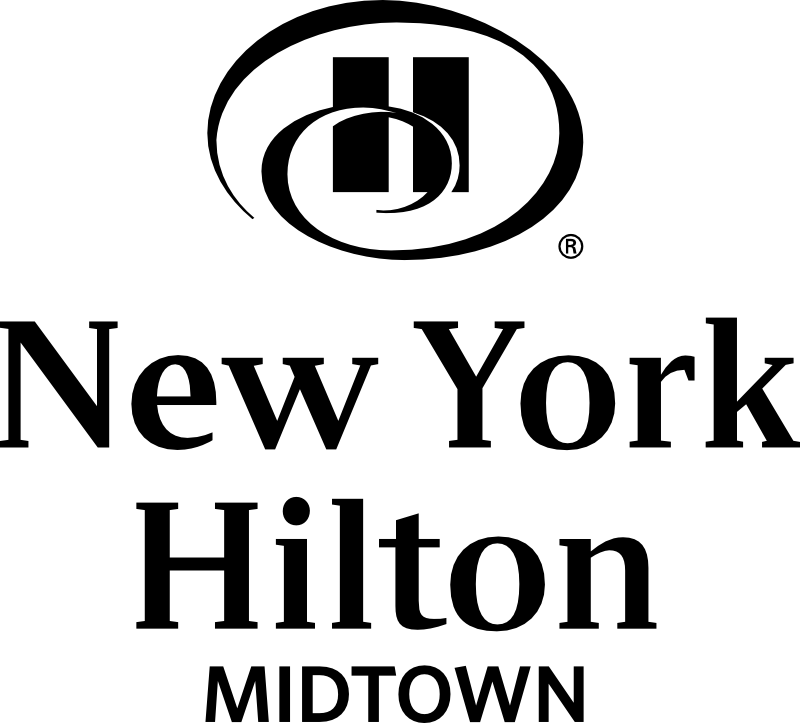

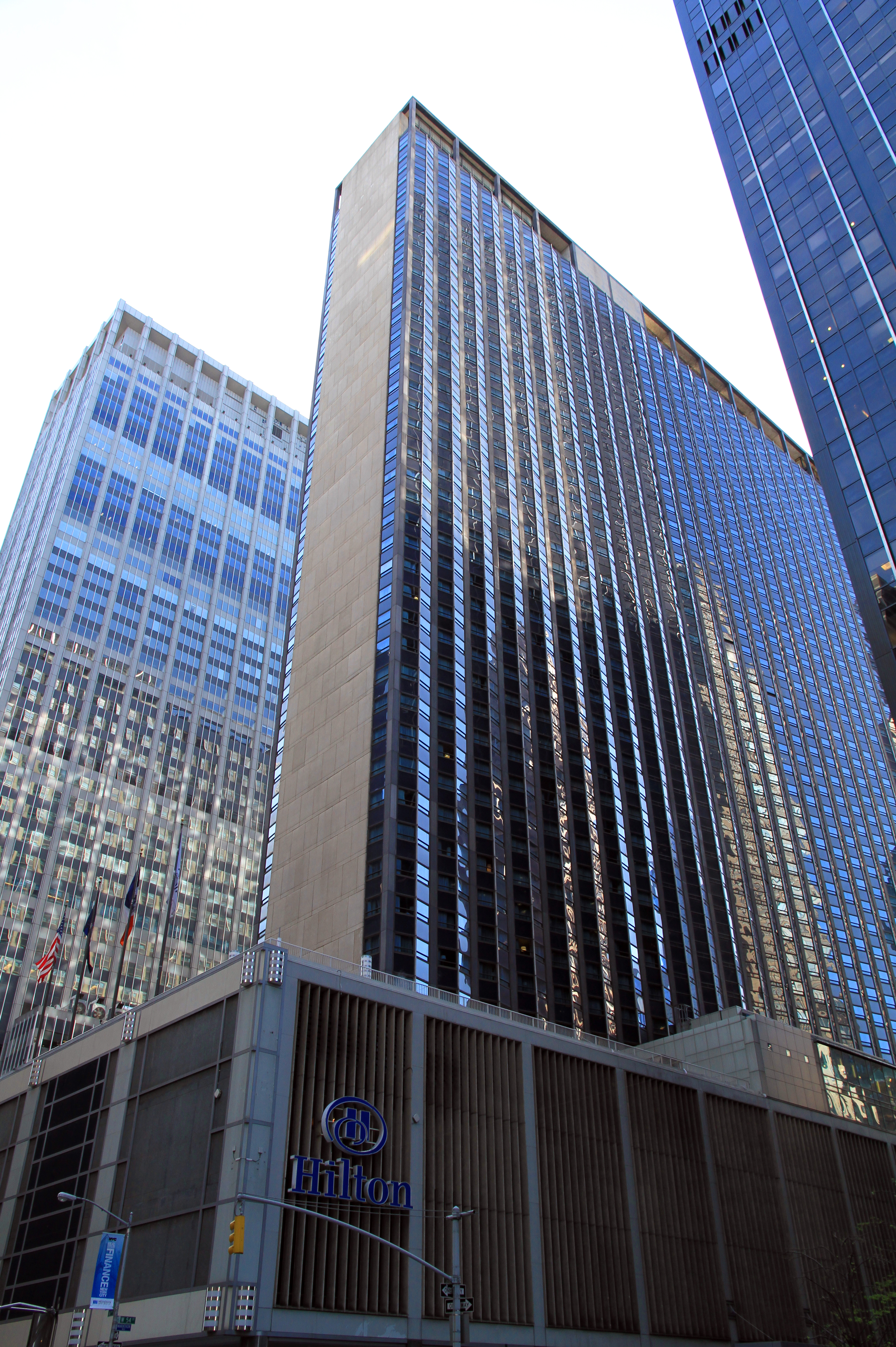
- The New York Hilton Midtown in 2013
- Interactive map of the New York Hilton Midtown area
- Hotel chain: Hilton Hotels & Resorts

General information
- Location: 1335 Avenue of the Americas; New York, New York
- Coordinates: 40°45′45″N 73°58′46″W
- Opening: June 26, 1963
- Owner: Park Hotels & Resorts
- Operator: Hilton Worldwide

Height
- Height: 487 ft (148 m)

Technical details
- Floor count: 47

Design and construction
- Architects: William B. Tabler Architects; Harrison & Abramovitz;
- Developer: Uris Buildings Corporation

Other information
- Number of rooms: approximately 2,000

Website
- Official website

The New York Hilton Midtown is the largest hotel in New York City. The hotel is owned by Park Hotels & Resorts and managed by Hilton Worldwide. It has approximately 2,000 rooms and over 150,000 square feet (14,000 m^{2}) of meeting space.

The 47-floor building, north of Rockefeller Center at Sixth Avenue and 53rd Street in Midtown Manhattan, has hosted every U.S. president since John F. Kennedy. The world's first handheld cell phone call was made in 1973 by hotel guest Martin Cooper, an engineer, in front of the hotel. Donald Trump delivered his 2016 United States presidential election victory speech at the hotel.

== History ==
The hotel was developed by Hilton Hotels Corporation, Rockefeller Center Incorporated, and the Uris Buildings Corporation. The original architect, Morris Lapidus, proposed to build a curved Fontainebleau Hotel-style building; however, he had to withdraw since he was also designing the competing Americana of New York hotel a block away. William B. Tabler was hired to finish the project, designing it with slabs.

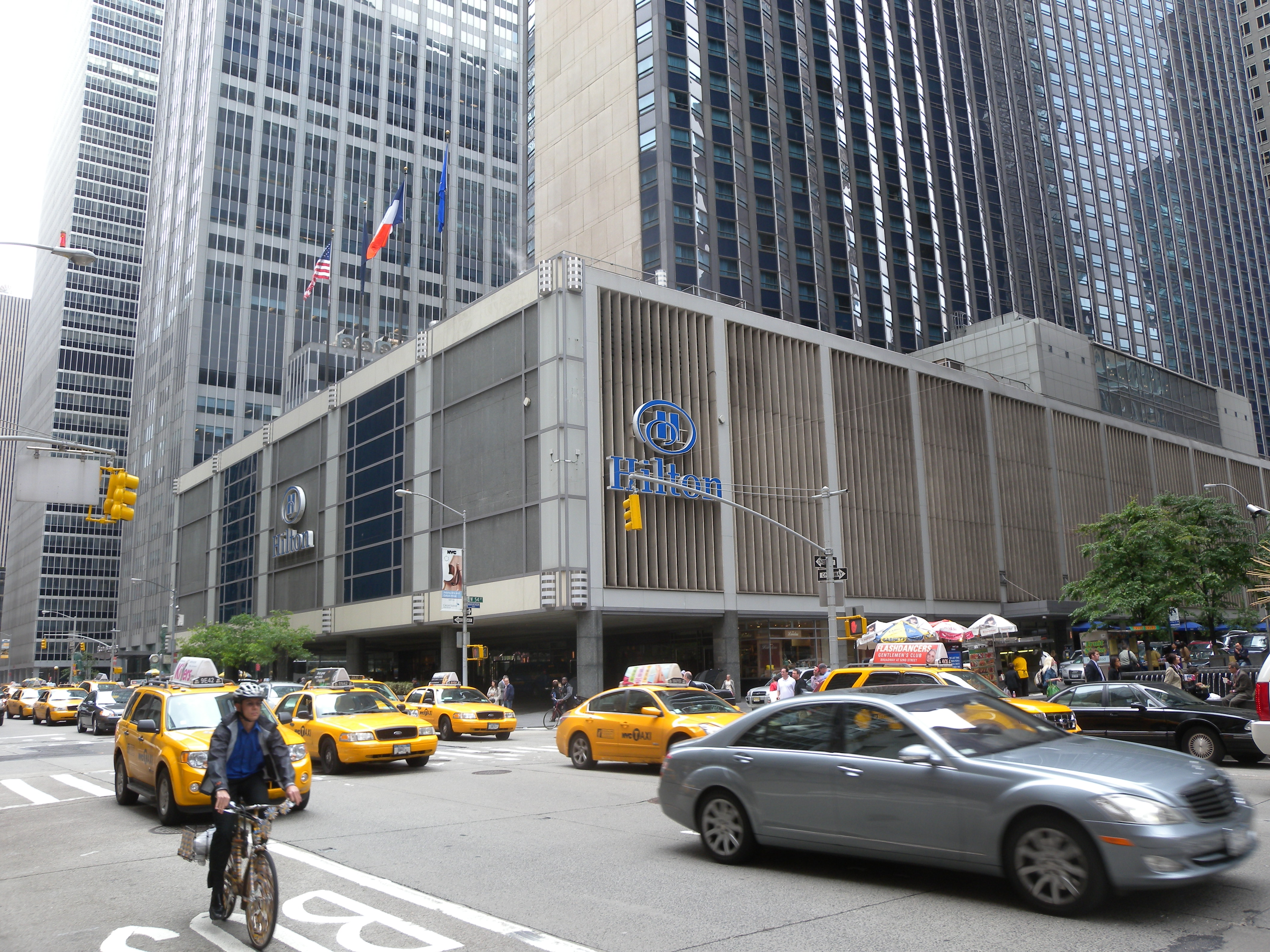
Base of the New York Hilton Midtown as seen from 6th Avenue and 54th Street

The hotel opened on June 26, 1963, as the New York Hilton at Rockefeller Center, and offered 2,153 rooms, making it the largest in the city.

In 1990, a $100 million renovation decreased the number of guest rooms to 1,980. The property underwent further renovations between 1991 and 1994, while a two-year, $100 million renovation was begun in 1998 which included a complete overhaul of the lobby and the addition of an 8,000-square-foot (740 m^{2}) Precor USA Fitness Center on the fifth floor. Around that time, the name was changed to Hilton New York, as all Hilton hotels were rebranding the Hilton name to appear before the city name at the time. In 2007, the hotel completed its fourth renovation; it now has 47 suites on floors 42 through 44. Each suite includes between 600 and 2,000 sq ft (56 and 186 m^{2}) of space.

In 2013, the hotel was renamed the New York Hilton Midtown for its 50th anniversary. Management simultaneously announced that it was ending room service and establishing a self-service cafeteria called "Herb n' Kitchen". Ownership of the hotel was transferred in 2017 to Park Hotels & Resorts when that company was spun off from Hilton Worldwide.

== Notable events and media ==
Hilton Hotels & Resorts asserts that the lyrics to John Lennon's 1971 song "Imagine" were composed in the hotel.

In late spring 1971, Neil Sheehan and colleagues at The New York Times were in rooms at the hotel organizing and summarizing the Pentagon Papers, an internal DoD study of the history of the Vietnam War which he had surreptitiously copied from Daniel Ellsberg for publication.

In June 1972, Elvis Presley stayed at the hotel while performing four sold-out concerts at nearby Madison Square Garden. He held a press conference before the first show at the hotel's Mercury Ballroom.

Martin Cooper made the world's first handheld cellular phone call in public April 3, 1973, when he called Joel S. Engel at the New York Hilton with a two-pound Motorola DynaTAC phone. Cooper, a Motorola inventor called his rival at Bell Labs to tell him about the invention. The cell phone base station was next door atop the 1345 Avenue of the Americas.

The hotel owned the property immediately west of it which was the site of the Adelphi Theatre where episodes of The Honeymooners were filmed. The Adelphi was torn down in 1970. In 1989, an office tower, 1325 Avenue of the Americas, was built on the site. The tower is connected to the Hilton with a walkway and keeps the Hilton's Sixth Avenue address even though it is midblock and closer to Seventh Avenue. Exterior shots of Elaine's workplace at the J. Peterman Company in Seinfeld show the building.

In the 2016 United States presidential election, Donald Trump held his election night victory party in the hotel's grand ballroom. The hotel is home to a number of award ceremonies, including the International Emmy Awards presented by the International Academy. Each spring, the hotel serves as the venue for the Inner Circle Show, the annual charity dinner produced by New York City journalists.

On December 4, 2024, United Healthcare CEO Brian Thompson was killed outside the hotel lobby, where he was scheduled to speak at an investor meeting.

Preceded by Americana Hotel	Venues of the NFL draft 1975	Succeeded by Roosevelt Hotel
