= William B. Tabler =

American architect

William B. Tabler Sr.
- Born: October 28, 1914; Momence, Illinois, U.S.
- Died: February 3, 2004 (aged 89); Upper Brookville, New York, U.S.
- Education: Harvard University
- Occupation: Architect
- Practice: William B Tabler Architects
- Buildings: Hilton New York; Hilton Washington
- Design: Efficient, modern hotels
- Website: www.williamtabler.com

William Benjamin Tabler Sr. (October 28, 1914 – February 3, 2004) was an American architect who designed more than 400 hotels. He was best known for giving Hilton hotels the clean but sometimes stark face of corporate America, most notably in the 46-story slablike New York Hilton Midtown near Rockefeller Center.

== Biography ==
Tabler was born in Momence, Illinois to Clyde Lyeth Tabler (1881–1965) and Frances Beatrice Ridley (1887–1983). He attended Harvard University and graduated bachelor of science (cum laude) in 1936, bachelor of architecture in 1939 and master of architecture the same year. In 1939 he joined the Chicago firm Holabird & Root, where he worked on his first big hotel project, the 1,000-room Statler Hotel in Washington, D.C.

After serving in the United States Navy Reserve from 1943 to 1946, he became head of Statler's in-house architecture department in 1946. He formed his own practice, William B Tabler Architects, in 1955.

Tabler's designs affected generations of travelers after World War II when downtown hotels began to look more and more like the office buildings around them.

Tabler designed the 2,153-room Hilton New York near Rockefeller Center in 1963 with David P. Dann for a partnership called Rock-Hil-Uris for its principals: Laurance S. Rockefeller, Conrad Hilton, and Percy Uris and Harold Uris.

On June 12, 1937, Tabler married Phyllis May Baker (1914–2006). They had two children, William Jr. and Judith. Tabler died at his home in Upper Brookville, New York at the age of 89. His son, William B. Tabler Jr., is also an architect and continues the architectural practice in Manhattan.

== Buildings ==
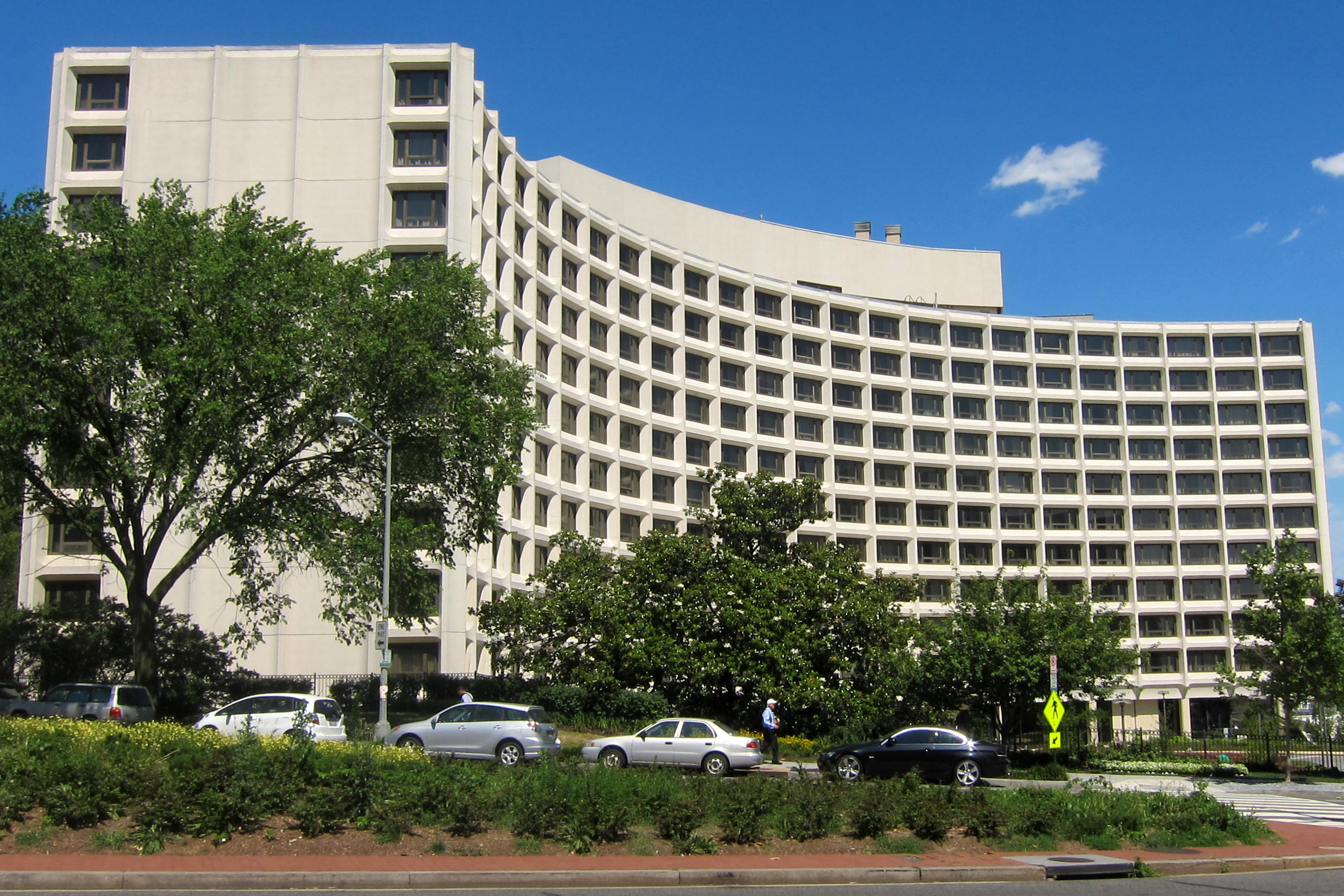
Hilton Washington, 2010

- The Statler Hilton Dallas (1956)
- Hotel El Salvador Intercontinental (1958)
- Pittsburgh Hilton (1959)
- El Ponce Intercontinental (1960-1975)
- New York Hilton (1963)
- London Hilton (1963)
- San Francisco Hilton (1964)
- Washington Hilton (1965)
- Inter-Continental Dacca (1966)
- Grand Hyatt Cairo (2000)
