= Hilton Cairo Grand Nile =

Hotel on Roda Island in Cairo, Egypt

Coordinates: 30.0348°N 31.2276°E

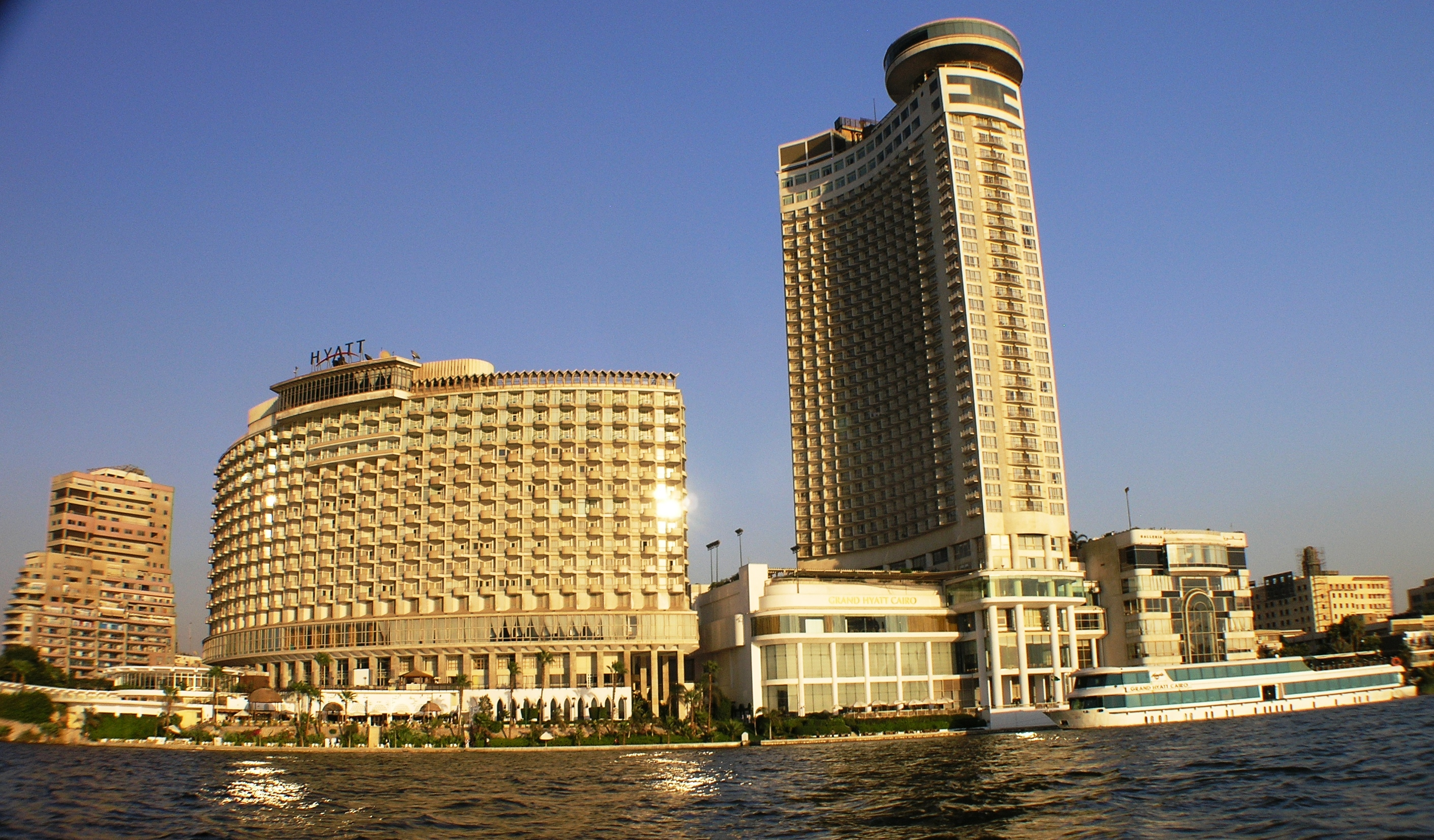
- Interactive map of the Hilton Cairo Grand Nile area

General information
- Location: Cairo, Egypt
- Opening: 1974; 52 years ago
- Owner: Orascom Investment Holding

Technical details
- Floor count: 41

Design and construction
- Architect: William B. Tabler Architects

Other information
- Number of rooms: 715

Website
- https://www.hilton.com/en/hotels/caignhi-cairo-grand-nile/

The Hilton Cairo Grand Nile is a five-star hotel located on Roda Island in Cairo, Egypt.

== History and profile ==
The 966-room original wing of the hotel opened in 1974 as the Hotel Meridien Cairo. In 2001, the $380 million, 715-room, 41-story skyscraper, with a revolving restaurant and a shopping mall, was added, and the hotel was relaunched in August 2001 as Le Royal Méridien Cairo & Nile Tower.

The hotel's owners, the Saudi Egyptian Touristic Development Company (SETDC), severed Le Méridien's management contract on 8 August 2002, closed the 1974 wing, and operated the newer wing of the hotel independently as the Royal Nile Tower for a year, until Hyatt International assumed management of the property on 1 August 2003, and the tower wing was renamed Grand Hyatt Cairo. Plans were announced to convert the closed 1974 wing into the 245-room Park Hyatt Cairo, following a $20 million renovation, but the project never came to fruition and the building remains closed as of 2025.

All foreign national Hyatt management and staff were evacuated in February 2011, as a result of the Egyptian revolution of 2011. Following this course of action, the hotel's remaining Egyptian staff began to strike, which led Hyatt to sever all ties to the property on 20 March 2011. SETDC was locked in legal disputes with Hyatt for four months, and the hotel continued to use the Hyatt name until 1 June 2011, when the owners officially changed the name to Grand Nile Tower.

It was announced in 2017 that the hotel would join the Hilton family and be renamed Hilton Cairo Grand Nile in 2018. The rebranding took effect on 29 November 2024, with the name change finally taking place.

== Gallery ==
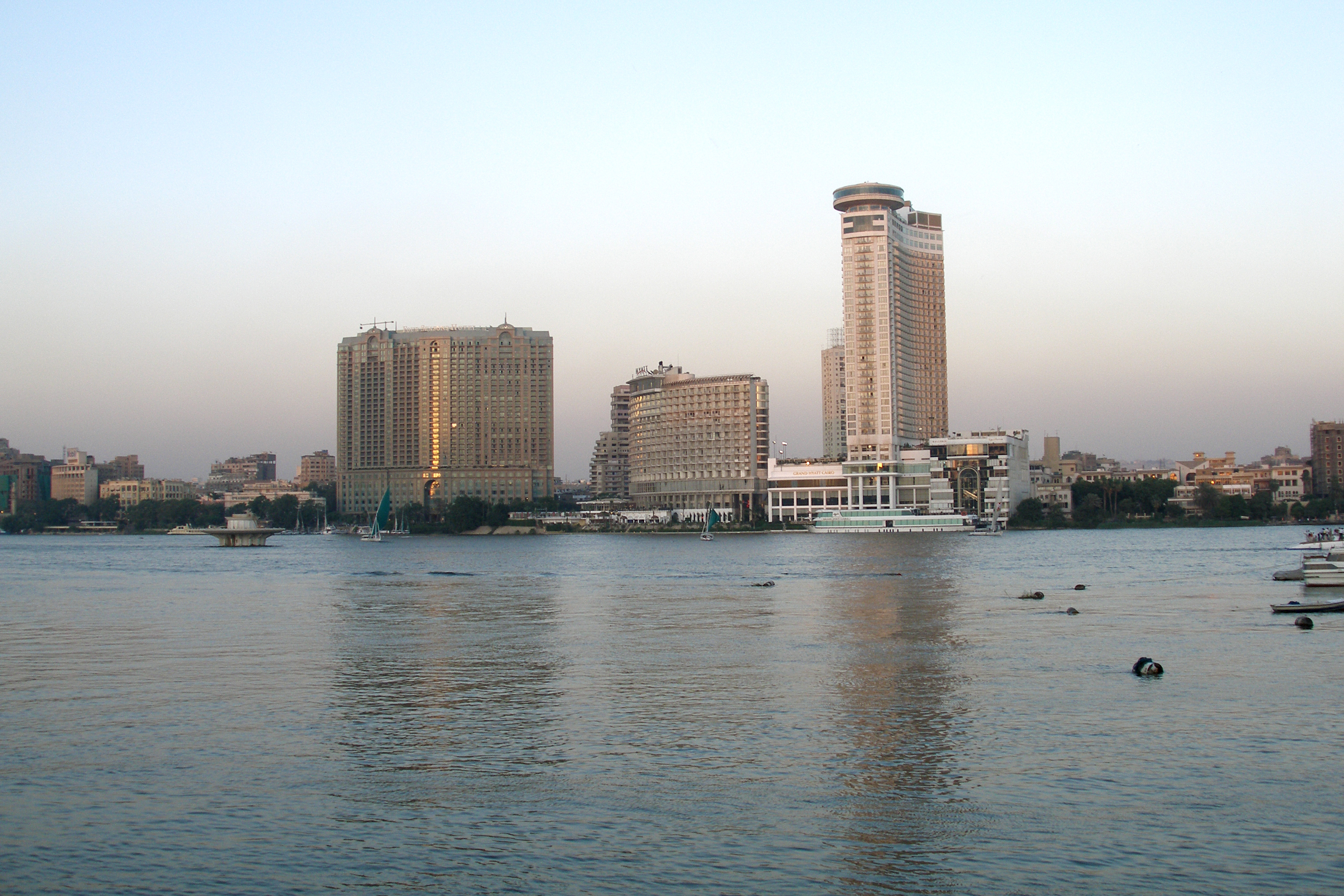
