= Museo Castillo Serrallés =

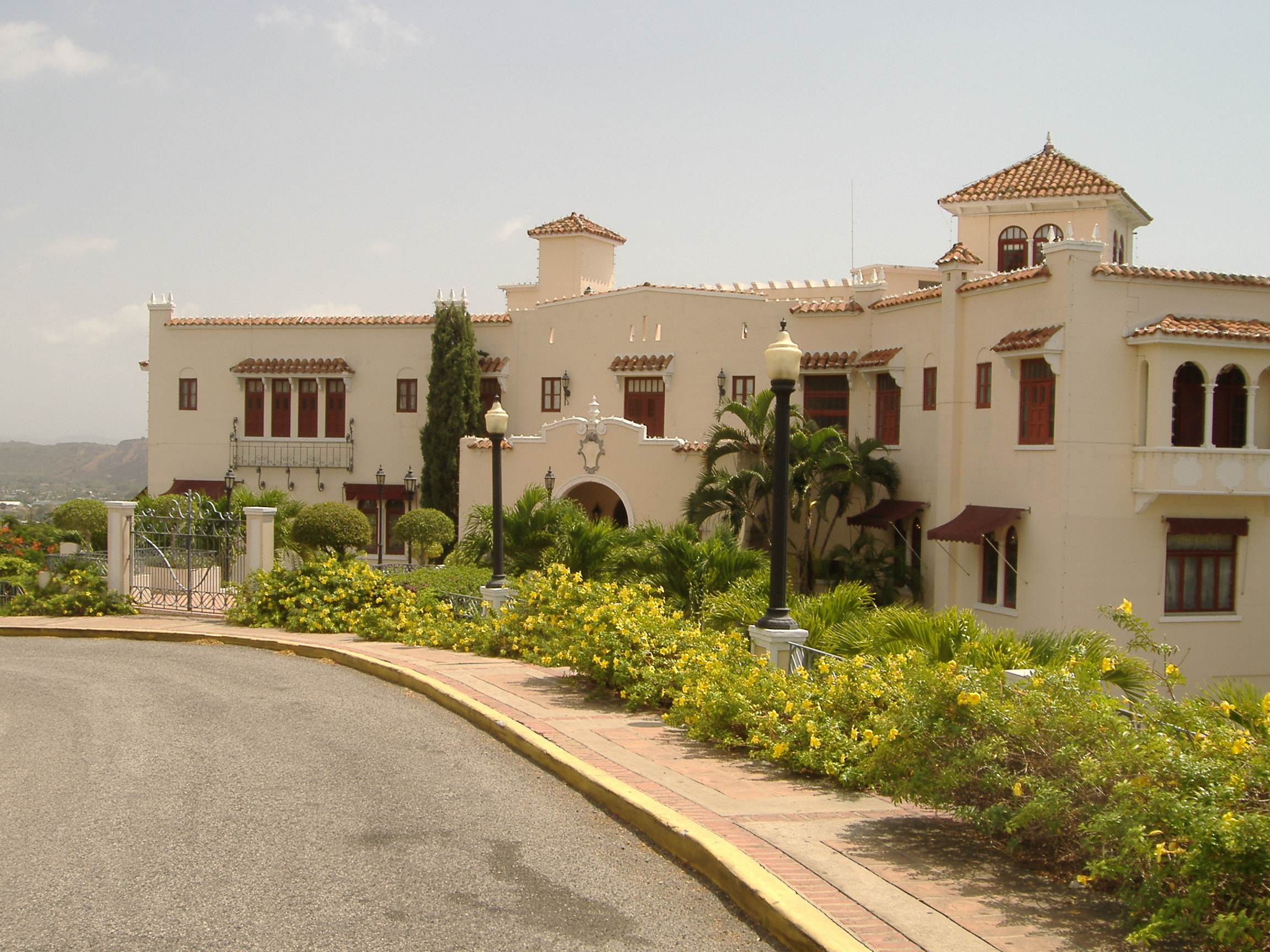
- Museo Castillo Serrallés

- Location within Puerto Rico
- Established: 20 February 1991
- Location: Cerro El Vigia (El Vigia Hill), Ponce, Puerto Rico
- Coordinates: 18°01′07″N 66°37′09″W
- Type: Sugar cane and rum History museum
- Visitors: 100,000
- Directors: Patronato del Castillo Serrallés, Inc. (until 24 January 2002); Patronato de Ponce (since 25 January 2002)
- Curator: Dr. Neysa Rodríguez Deynes
- Owner: Municipality of Ponce
- Website: http://www.castilloserralles.org/

Museo Castillo Serrallés (English: Serrallés Castle Museum), a.k.a. Museo de la Caña y el Ron (English: Sugar Cane and Rum Museum), is an agricultural museum in the city of Ponce, Puerto Rico, that showcases the history of sugar cane, its derivative rum industry, and their impact in the economy of Puerto Rico. The most notorious feature of the museum is the building it occupies. The building is a large four-story structure built in the 1930s for the owner of Ponce's Destileria Serralles, one of Puerto Rico's largest rum distilleries. The distillery was once also home to Puerto Rico's largest sugar-factory called Central Mercedita, producers of the Snow White sugar brand. The building, known as Castillo Serrallés, was designed by Pedro Adolfo de Castro in 1930 in the Spanish Colonial Revival style.

The museum sits on a 2.5-acre lot and opened on 20 February 1991. Visitors can tour the refurbished home, which has been furnished to appear as it did in the 1930s. There is also a temporary exhibit area for local artists. The Serrallés Castle is now part of a large complex that includes the Cruceta El Vigía, a Japanese Garden, and a butterfly garden (Mariposario). By September 2010, the museum was receiving around 100,000 visitors per year.

== Location ==
The museum sits on a hilltop overlooking the downtown area (Ponce Pueblo). Built during the 1930s by order of Juan Eugenio Serrallés, son of businessman Juan Serrallés, founder of Destilería Serrallés, the museum structure sits on a 2.5-acre (1.0 ha) exceedingly manicured property. The museum is one of the most iconic structures in Puerto Rico and receives some 100,000 visitors a year.

== History ==
External audio
- You may see a video about Museo Castillo Serrallés HERE

The house was purchased by the city of Ponce from the Serrallés heirs. While the castle was valued at $17–$25 million, it was purchased for a mere $400,000 and included much of the furniture in the sale. The city's initial intent was to turn it into a museum of Puerto Rican music. The Museum of Puerto Rican Music, however, was eventually established elsewhere in the city.

The castle was built in 1926 by local architect Pedro Adolfo de Castro y Besosa. It includes two huge terraces, an outside fountain, and a symmetrical backyard garden. Its interior includes a luxurious hall, a spacious dining room, and an interior courtyard.

== Administration ==
The museum is administered and operated by a non-governmental, non-profit, civic organization called Patronato de Ponce. The organization received an endowment from the Ponce Municipal Government of $600,000 a year during the 2008-2009 fiscal year, but due to the worldwide economic downturn the Municipality dropped its endowment to $300,000 per year in 2010. It had also been receiving an undisclosed amount in yearly donations from the private sector, but $75,000 of that was also dropped due to the economy. The museum operates with a $1.2M yearly budget.

== Displays and tours ==
Access to the museum is through the side patio/balcony entrance on the southern end of the building. The museum can only be seen via guided group tours, and tour guides are very diligent in enforcing this rule as the administration does not want visitors wandering around the house on their own. The only on-your-own time comes at the gift shop.

The museum has four floors, and the displays on each floor focus on a particular aspect of the museum and the lives of its former owners.

The ground floor, which is the castle's former basement, houses all of the museum's rum and sugar-related expositions. On its northern end is the castle's former 3-car garage now turned into the museum's gift shop. This level also houses the main entrance to the museum on its southern end. On the main, center area are the former service quarters which used to house mechanical, electrical, and water storage facilities. These have been remodeled to provide for the turnstile entry, a restaurant, and an auditorium capable of sitting some 50 visitors. There are also some Patronato offices on this floor.

The second floor contains the castle owner's former library, a central patio, a solarium, the living room, dining room, and the kitchen. More photos adorn the wall on this level, shown the development of both rum and sugar businesses. This level contains the former formal access to the house via its front main entrance.

The third floor contains all the sleeping quarters. These are shown with furniture as well as all types of personal accessories of the former occupants. Throughout this level are wall-hung pictures of the rum-producing family clan. The pictures here are oriented towards the personal and family live of the clan.

The fourth floor is the terrace, from where the most impressive and commanding views of the city are possible. Intended as a relaxed entertainment space, the terrace has both covered and uncovered areas.

== Gardens ==
The city also rejuvenated the surrounding landscape. The backyard now consists of lush green grass, fountains, manicured shrubs, and lights. The first floor also houses an outdoor square that is covered by the roof over the second floor. The city uses this area to showcase the work of local artists and photographers. The area is now used for private weddings, quinceañera celebrations, and other similar social events.

== See also ==
- Don Q
- Casa Serrallés
