= Barleylands Farm Museum =

Farm museum in Billericay, England

Coordinates: 51.60123974°N 0.44574279°E

- Location: Barleylands, Billericay, Essex, England

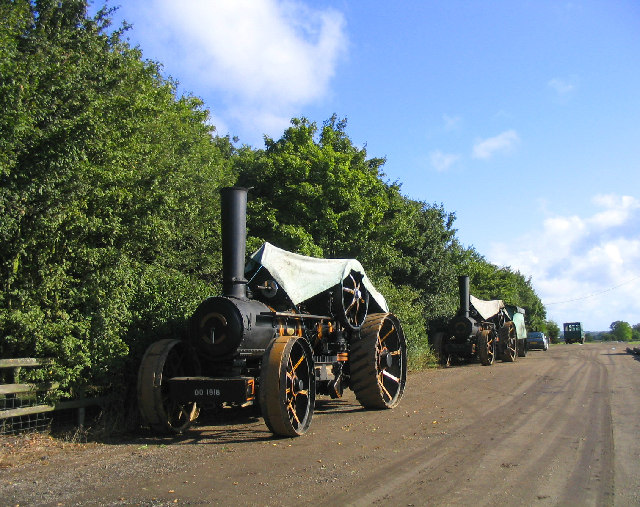
Steam traction engines at Barleylands Farm Museum.

Barleylands Farm Museum is a children's event venue located in Barleylands, Billericay, Essex. It is known for animal care, children's birthday parties, events at Easter, Halloween, and Christmas.

== Events ==
The Barleylands showground hosts local sports teams for training and matches, as well as weddings and local events.

=== Essex Country Show ===
The Farm hosted the annual Essex Country Show on the second weekend in September, from 1986 to 2016.

Founded in 1986, the Essex Country Show featured many aspects of agricultural history and rural life. Skills such as spinning, hurdle making, and blacksmithing, and rare skills like coracle-making and clog-making were demonstrated. Animal displays included heavy horses, a sheep shearing show, working dogs and small animal displays. The show included 50 working steam engines and 60 model engines, vintage tractors, cars and motorcycles, model boats on the lake, a threshing demonstration, a specialist food hall, music, arena events, craft marquees, amusements, funfair and trade stands.

The show closed in 2016 due to increasing operating costs.
