= Cerro del Vigía =

Foothill in Ponce, Puerto Rico

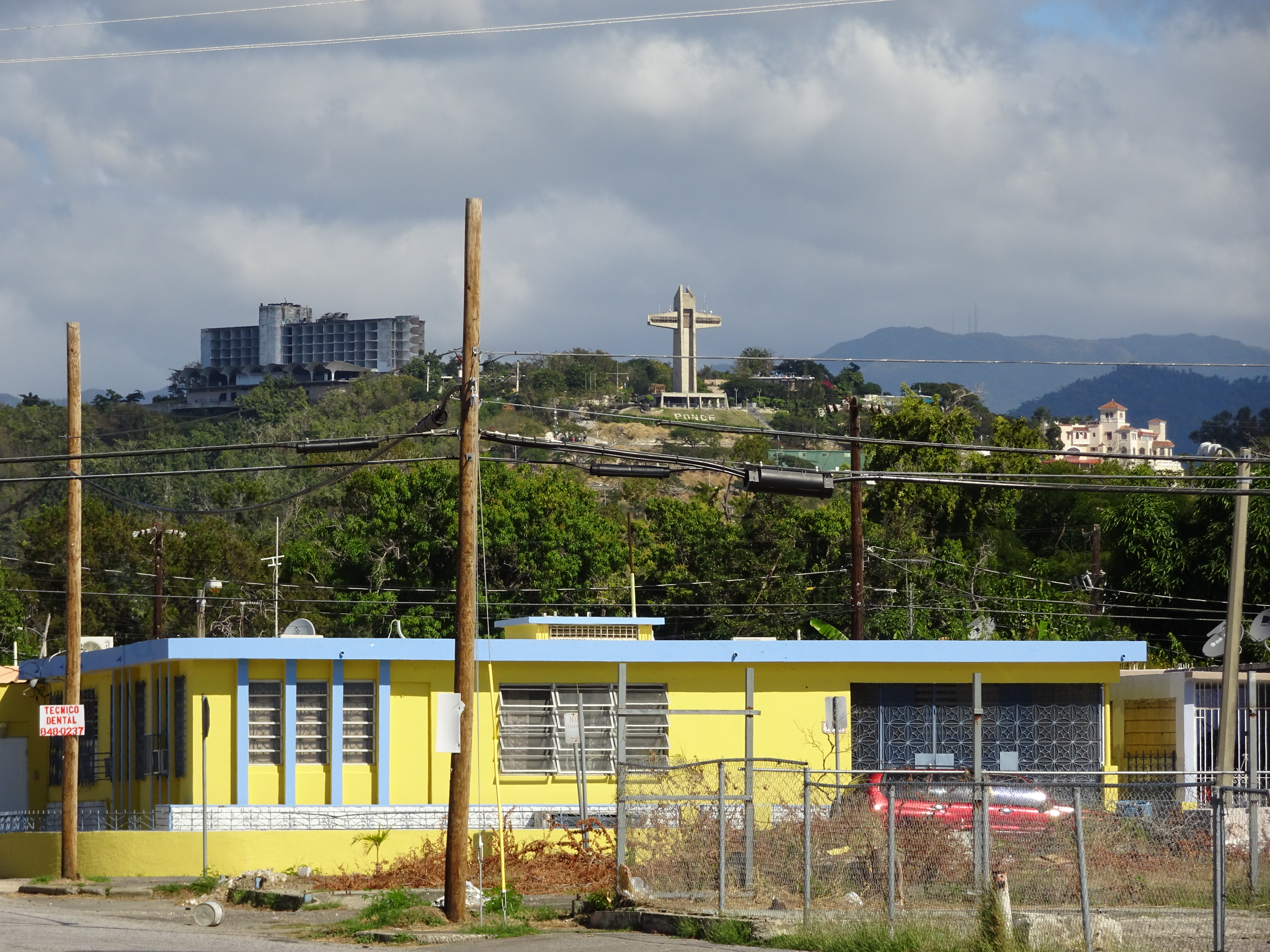
- Cerro del Vigía (in the background) with its iconic Hotel, Cruceta and Castle

Highest point
- Elevation: 456 ft (139 m)
- Prominence
- Coordinates: 18°01′08″N 66°37′13″W

Geography
- Location within Puerto Rico
- Location: Ponce, Puerto Rico
- Parent range: Cordillera Central

Climbing
- Easiest route: Calle Bertoly, Ponce, Puerto Rico

Cerro del Vigía (Note: Some sources call this hill "Cerro El Vigía". Here we use the much older --and yet currently in continued widespread use-- "Cerro del Vigía", in part because it works as a reminder as to the history of the hill (i.e., the hill of the watchman) and in part because it is the name found in the oldest map of the hill known to exist. Said map is dated 1818 and was first published by Eduardo Neumann Gandía in "Verdadera y Auténtica Historia de la Ciudad de Ponce: desde sus primitivos tiempos hasta la época contemporánea", in 1913, pages 65-66. (Reprinted in 1987 in San Juan, P.R. by Instituto de Cultura Puertorriqueña.)) is a hill in the municipality of Ponce, Puerto Rico, located just north of the city of Ponce. A tourist destination, it is home to Museo Castillo Serrallés, Cruceta del Vigía, and the former Hotel Ponce Intercontinental.

The 456-foot high hill sits at the foothills of the Cordillera Central and is located in Barrio Portugués Urbano. The hill is home to several well-to-do mansions of which the best known is Castillo Serrallés, now a Museum.

== Location and geology ==
The hill is part of the Cordillera Central and is located just north of Barrio Segundo in the urban zone of Ponce. It is located at coordinates 18° 01' 08", -66° 37' 13". Just west of Cerro del Vigía is Ponce Cement, as the hills in this area are mostly limestone.

== Best view ==
The view from atop Cerro del Vigía is said to be "the best view in all of Ponce". On a clear day, it is possible to see clearly all the way to Caja de Muertos. There is a 100-feet observation cross at the top of the hill from where the entire zone can be observed. The best road for access to the top of the hill is Calle Bertoly.

== See also ==
- Juan Serrallés
- Destilería Serrallés
- Don Q
