= Cruceta del Vigía =

Tall cross located atop Cerro del Vigía in Ponce, Puerto Rico

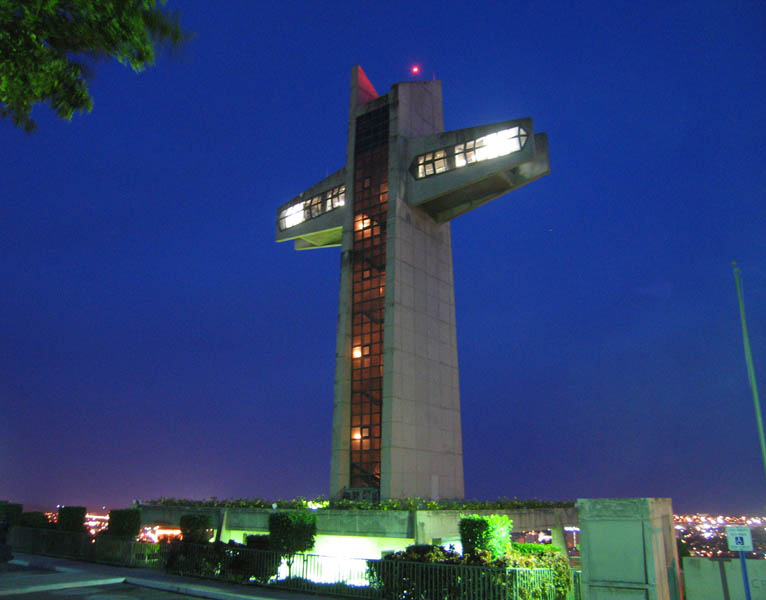
- View of the cross at night. The city of Ponce shines in the background below the hill. The Caribbean Sea is further to the right.

General information
- Status: Open
- Type: Monument
- Architectural style: Modern arch style
- Location: Barrio Portugues Urbano, Cerro del Vigía, Ponce, Puerto Rico
- Coordinates: 18°01′08.35″N 66°37′12.66″W
- Current tenants: Patronato de Ponce
- Groundbreaking: 1983
- Construction started: 1983
- Completed: 1984
- Opened: 1984
- Inaugurated: 1984
- Cost: $650,000
- Client: Municipality of Ponce
- Owner: Autonomous Municipality of Ponce

Height
- Tip: 110 feet (34 m)

Dimensions
- Other dimensions: 70 feet (21 m) across

Technical details
- Structural system: Steel and Reinforced concrete
- Floor count: 10
- Lifts/elevators: One

Design and construction
- Architect: Ruben Colondres
- Architecture firm: Colondres & Laboy
- Structural engineer: Jose L. Irizarry
- Services engineer: Ramon Montero
- Civil engineer: Axel Bonilla
- Quantity surveyor: Jose Raul Vazquez-Geli
- Main contractor: Venegas Construction Corp.

Other information
- Parking: Lighted Lot

Cruceta del Vigía (English: The Watchman Cross) is a 100-foot (30 m) tall cross located atop Cerro del Vigía in Ponce, Puerto Rico, across from Museo Castillo Serrallés which is a non-profit also responsible for the preservation of the cross as well as other city landmarks. It houses a tourist center at its base, a ten-story vertical tower, and a horizontal sky bridge that has panoramic views of the city of Ponce and the Caribbean Sea. Visitors can reach the skybridge via glass elevators or a staircase. Made of reinforced concrete, the cross has withstood various natural disasters, including three major hurricanes. The arms of the cross measure 70 feet. It was inaugurated in 1984.

One of many landmarks of the city of Ponce, the cross is owned by the Municipality of Ponce and is currently operated by the "Patronato de Ponce", a non-profit organization dedicated to preserving the city's cultural heritage. (Note: The structured was managed by the Municipality of Ponce until 1995 when, under a public-nonprofit agreement, it came to be administered by the Patronato de Ponce.) It is visited annually by some 100,000 tourists.

== Historical background ==
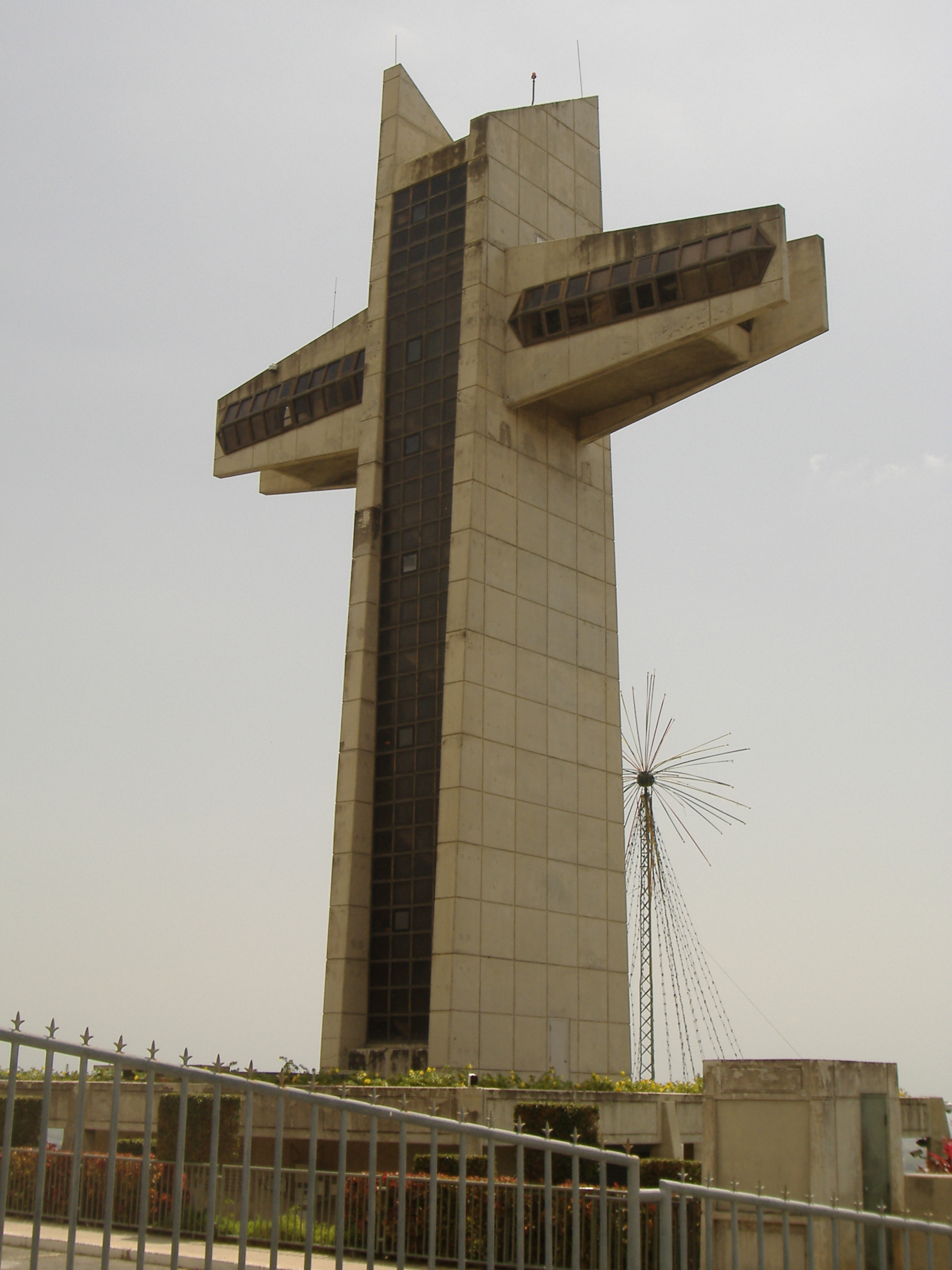
View of Cruceta del Vigía.

The cross sits at the same spot on Cerro del Vigía where early settlers once looked out for merchant ships and would-be invaders, including marauding pirates. In 1801, the settlers built a much smaller cross made of two intersecting tree trunks where an observer would constantly watch the sea and the city's port, raising different flags to either notify local merchants of incoming trade ships or alert military authorities of possible threats (a replica of this wooden cross now sits behind the current monument). Originally a hut was built accompanied by a cross from where flags were raised to signal the approach of ships as well as their port of origin. This station was run by two brothers Ricardo and Alberto Lugo, they were honored with a plaque at the base of the cross in 1984. They are descendants of Alonso Fernández de Lugo last conquistador of Spain.

One of the best remembered watchmen was named Luis Castro. Nearly 200 years ago, Luis would sit atop a huge wooden cross on this hill. On the lookout for ocean vessels, it was his responsibility to determine the nationality of approaching ships. If he recognized the vessel he would raise a flag, but if a ship was thought to be carrying contraband then no flag was raised and the Spanish military would investigate. The Cruceta was built in honor of Castro and all the other watchmen who so faithfully helped protect the city during its younger years.

The Cerro del Vigía also served as a refugee camp for citizens during the storm of 12 September 1738, the earthquake of 10 May 1787, the tsunami of 18 November 1867, and the American invasion of 25 July 1898.

== Japanese Garden ==
In recent years, a Japanese Garden was built in the grounds nearby the Cruceta. The garden is located in a 2,223 square meter ground. Its purpose is to encourage spiritual peace and harmony by the means of nature and Zen music. The garden features small lakes, rivers, bonsais, and bridges.

== Gallery ==
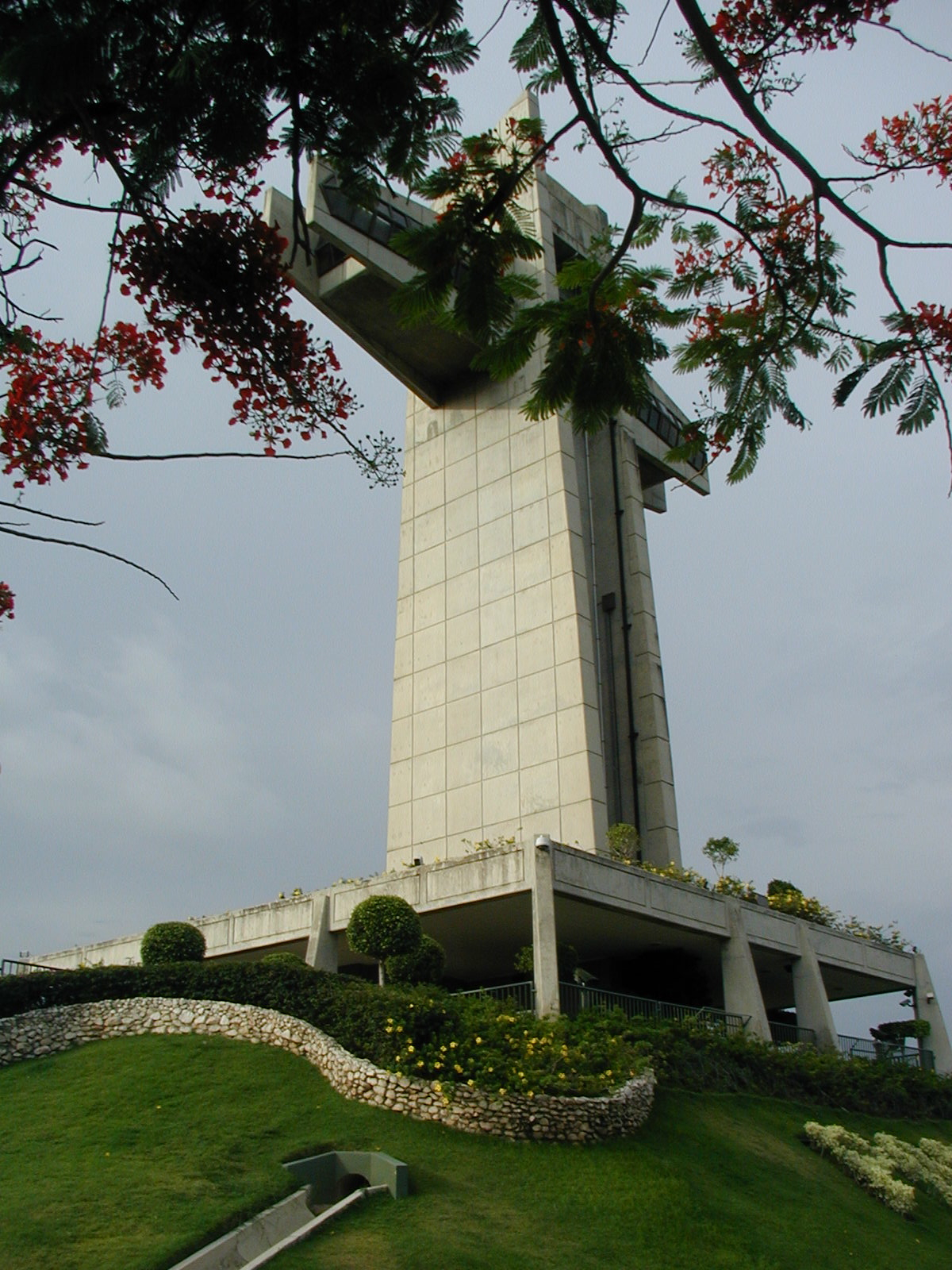
Cruceta del Vigía and garden

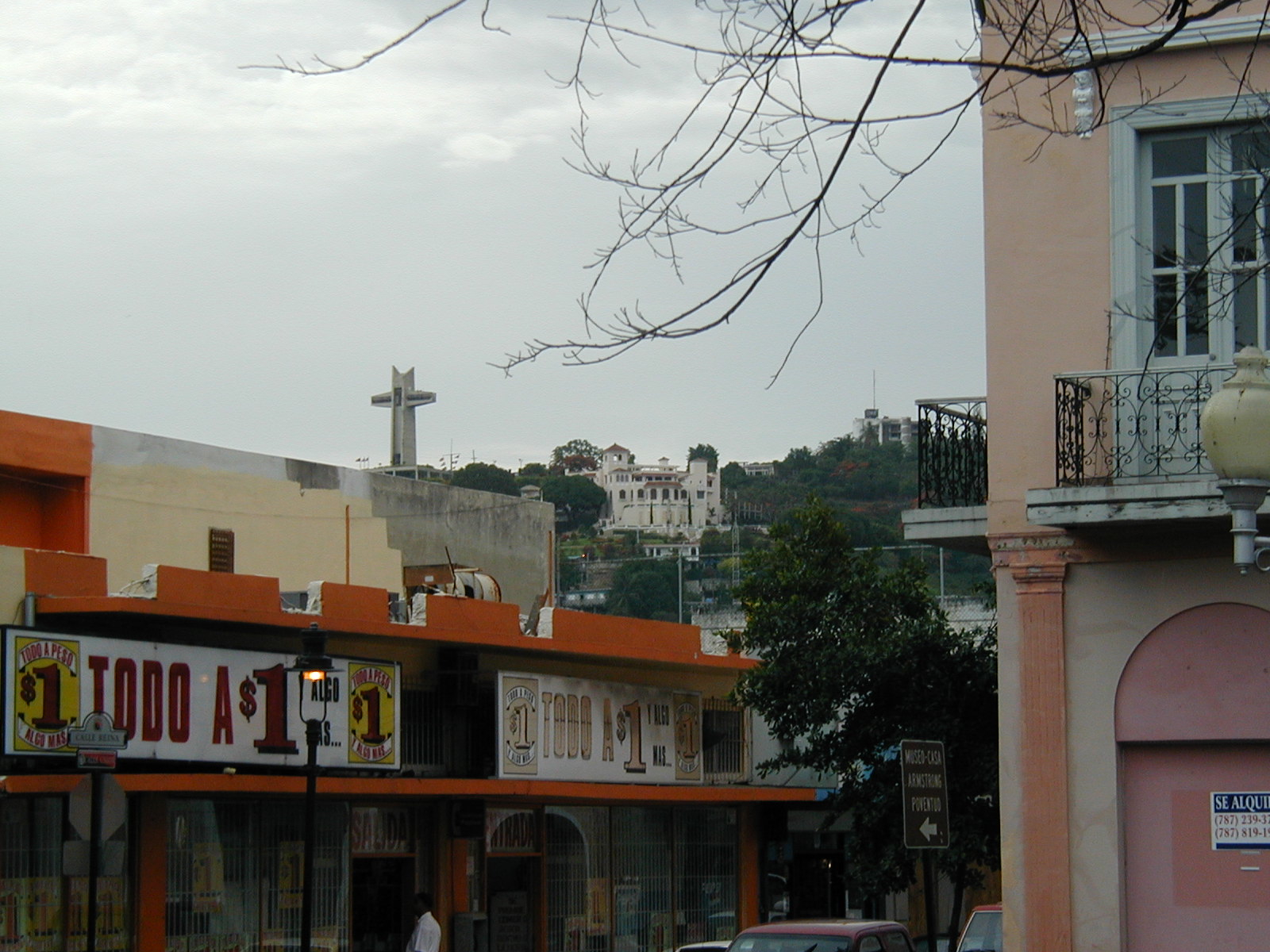
Cruceta del Vigía in Ponce seen at a distance
