= List of highways in Ponce, Puerto Rico =

Map of major roads in Ponce, Puerto Rico, shown in red.

This is a list of highways in Ponce, Puerto Rico. The list focuses on major, signed, roads in the municipality of Ponce, Puerto Rico. The list shows local roads, that is, those with both terminuses within the municipality ("intra-municipal" roads), as well as inter-municipal roads.

== List of highways ==
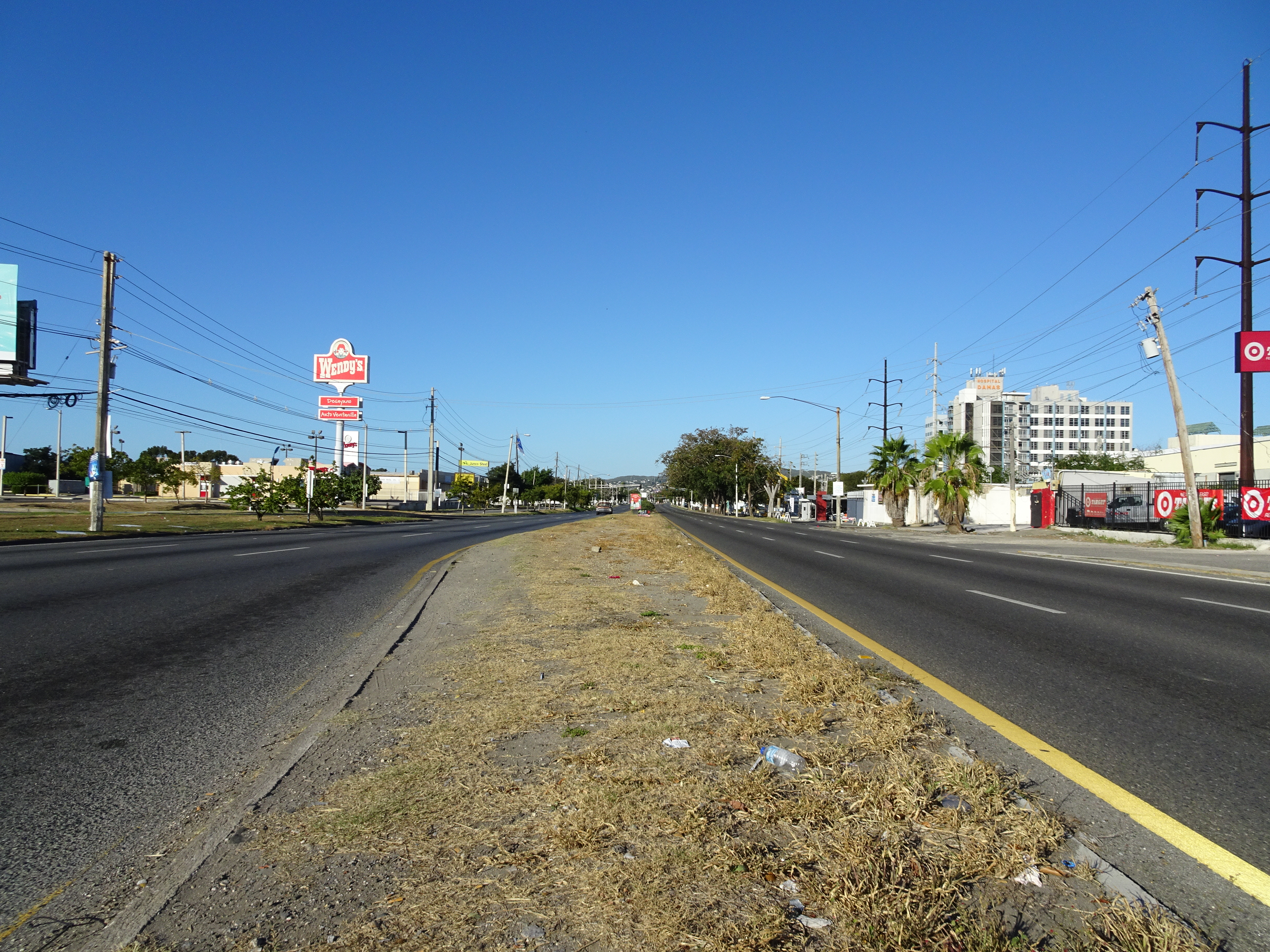
PR-2 (Ponce Bypass) looking west

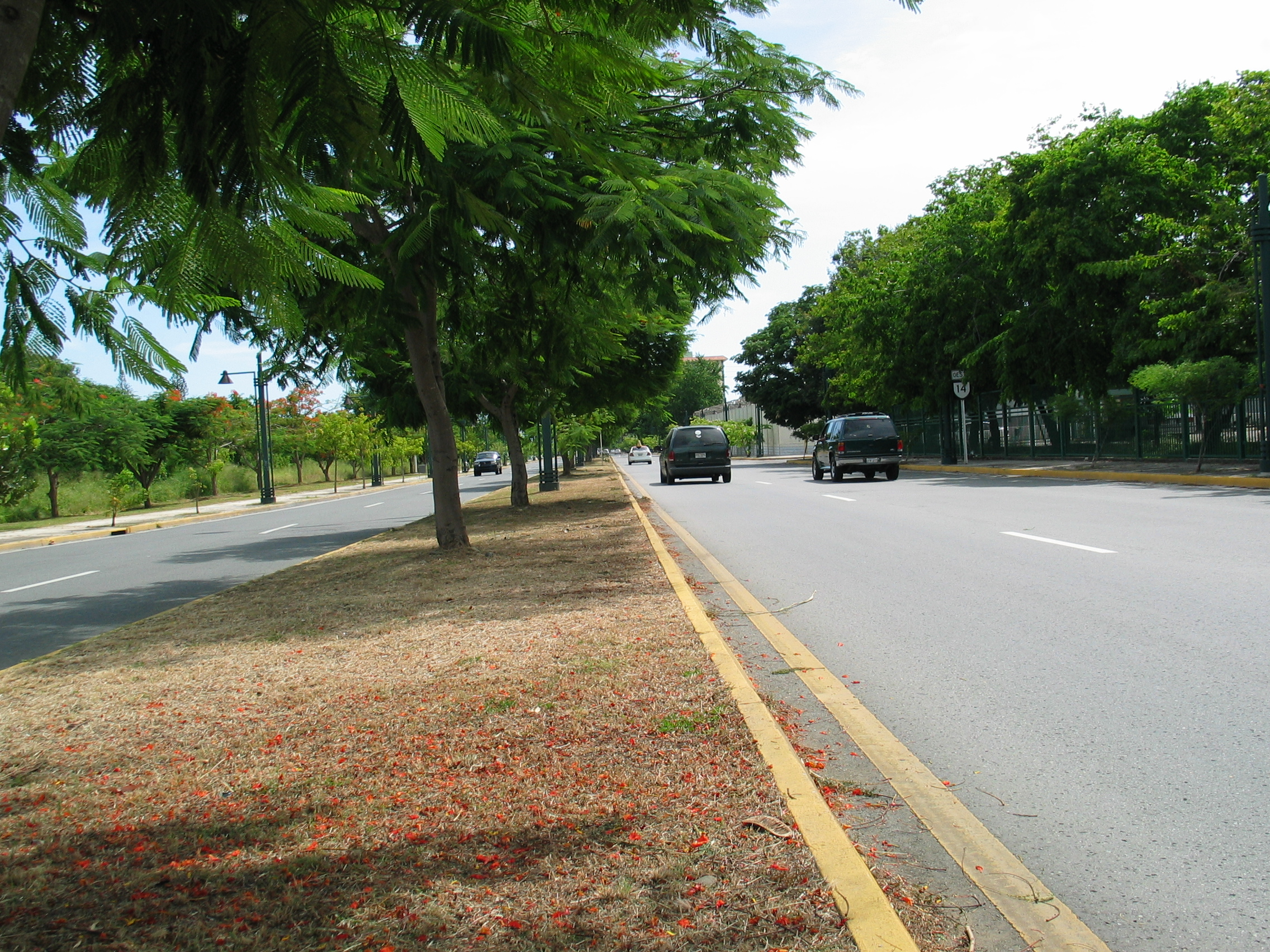
PR-14 (a.k.a. Avenida Tito Castro) west of PR-10, looking west

Route	Network	Axis	Southern or western terminus	Northern or eastern terminus	Type	Length, km (mi)	Notes	Photo
PR-1	Primary	S to N	Ponce	San Juan	Inter-municipal	133.7 (83.1)	via Cayey	
PR-1P	Primary	W to E	Ponce	Tercero	Local	unknown	—	
PR-2	Primary	S to N	Ponce	San Juan	Inter-municipal	230 (140)	via Mayagüez	
PR-2R	Primary	S to N	Canas	Canas Urbano	Local	1.6 (0.99)	—	
PR-9	Primary	S to N	Vayas	Canas	Local	12 (7.5)	via Portugués; a.k.a. Expreso Román Baldorioty de Castro	
PR-10	Primary	S to N	Ponce	Arecibo	Inter-municipal	68.26 (42.41)	via Adjuntas	
PR-12	Primary	S to N	Playa	Ponce	Local	5.28 (3.28)	a.k.a. Expreso Santiago de los Caballeros	
PR-14	Primary	W to E	Ponce	Cayey	Inter-municipal	73.1 (45.4)	—	
PR-14P	Primary	W to E	Ponce	Machuelo Abajo	Local	unknown	—	
PR-14R	Primary	W to E	Ponce	Machuelo Abajo	Local	unknown	—	
PR-52	Primary	S to N	Ponce	San Juan	Inter-municipal	108 (67)	a.k.a. Expreso Luis A. Ferré	
PR-123	Secondary	S to N	Ponce	Arecibo	Inter-municipal	60 (37)	via Adjuntas	
PR-123P	Secondary	S to N	Primero	Ponce	Local	unknown	—	
PR-132	Secondary	W to E	Guayanilla	Ponce	Inter-municipal	25.9 (16.1)	—	
PR-133	Secondary	W to E	Ponce	San Antón	Local	2.0 (1.2)	a.k.a. Calle Comercio	
PR-139	Secondary	S to N	Ponce	Maragüez	Local	24.8 (15.4)	—	
PR-139R	Secondary	S to N	Machuelo Arriba	Maragüez	Local	2.9 (1.8)	—	
PR-143	Secondary	W to E	Adjuntas	Barranquitas	Inter-municipal	58.7 (36.5)	via Ponce	
PR-163	Secondary	W to E	Canas Urbano	San Antón	Local	4.8 (3.0)	a.k.a. Avenida Las Américas	
PR-500	Tertiary	W to E	Canas	Magueyes	Local	1.00 (0.62)	—	
PR-501	Tertiary	S to N	Ponce	Marueño	Local	7.0 (4.3)	—	
PR-502	Tertiary	S to N	Ponce	Quebrada Limón	Local	5.3 (3.3)	—	
PR-503	Tertiary	S to N	Cantera	Jayuya	Local	21.8 (13.5)	—	
PR-504	Tertiary	S to N	Ponce	Portugués	Local	6.7 (4.2)	—	
PR-505	Tertiary	S to N	Ponce	Machuelo Arriba	Local	16.6 (10.3)	—	
PR-506	Tertiary	S to N	Cantera	Vayas	Local	2.0 (1.2)	—	
PR-507	Tertiary	S to N	Capitanejo	Capitanejo	Local	unknown	As of around January 2023, this road seems to have lost its PR-507 designation as a new road is now signed with the PR-507 designation in Machuelo Arriba. This can be seen here, here, and here. This road now signed as PR-507 leads from PR-139 to the Luis A. "Wito" Morales Park.	
PR-510	Tertiary	S to N	Capitanejo	Juana Díaz	Inter-municipal	10.3 (6.4)	—	
PR-511	Tertiary	S to N	Ponce	Anón	Local	16.4 (10.2)	—	
PR-515	Tertiary	W to E	Guaraguao	Guaraguao	Local	1.5 (0.93)	—	
PR-516	Tertiary	W to E	Guaraguao	Guaraguao	Local	3.1 (1.9)	—	
PR-520	Tertiary	W to E	Peñuelas	Quebrada Limón	Inter-municipal	unknown	—	
PR-549	Tertiary	S to N	Canas	Canas	Local	4.2 (2.6)	—	
PR-577	Tertiary	S to N	Anón	Anón	Local	0.30 (0.19)	Cerro Maravilla; dead end road	
PR-578	Tertiary	W to E	Bucaná	Sabanetas	Local	0.9 (0.56)	—	
PR-581	Tertiary	S to N	Capitanejo	Capitanejo	Local	unknown	—	
PR-585	Tertiary	S to N	Canas	Playa	Local	3.8 (2.4)	—	
PR-588	Tertiary	S to N	Portugués	Portugués	Local	1.7 (1.1)	—	
PR-591	Tertiary	W to E	El Tuque	El Tuque	Local	3.1 (1.9)	—	
PR-5139	Tertiary	S to N	Cerrillos	Machuelo Arriba	Local	2.8 (1.7)	—	
PR-5506	Tertiary	S to N	Vayas	Sabanetas	Local	1.4 (0.87)	—	
PR-5510	Tertiary	S to N	Capitanejo	Juana Díaz	Inter-municipal	1.4 (0.87)	—	
PR-5549	Tertiary	S to N	Canas Urbano	Canas Urbano	Local	unknown	—	

== See also ==
- List of highways in Puerto Rico
- List of streets in Ponce, Puerto Rico
