= Puerto Rico Highway 501 =

Highway in Puerto Rico

Highway 501
- Ruta 501

Route information
- Maintained by Puerto Rico DTPW
- Length: 10.3 km (6.4 mi)

Southern segment
- South end: PR-123 in Magueyes
- Major intersections: PR-502 in Marueño
- North end: Sector La Jagua in Marueño

Northern segment
- South end: Sector Las Lomas in Marueño
- North end: PR-123 in Guaraguao

Location
- Country: United States
- Territory: Puerto Rico
- Municipalities: Ponce

Highway system
- Roads in Puerto Rico; List
← PR-500	→ PR-502

Puerto Rico Highway 501 (PR-501) is a tertiary state highway in Ponce, Puerto Rico. The road runs north to south, and mostly alongside Rio Pastillo in barrio Marueño. It southern terminus is at PR-123, just off Calle 18 of Urbanización Las Delicias in barrio Magueyes, and its northern end is also at PR-123 but in barrio Guaraguao.

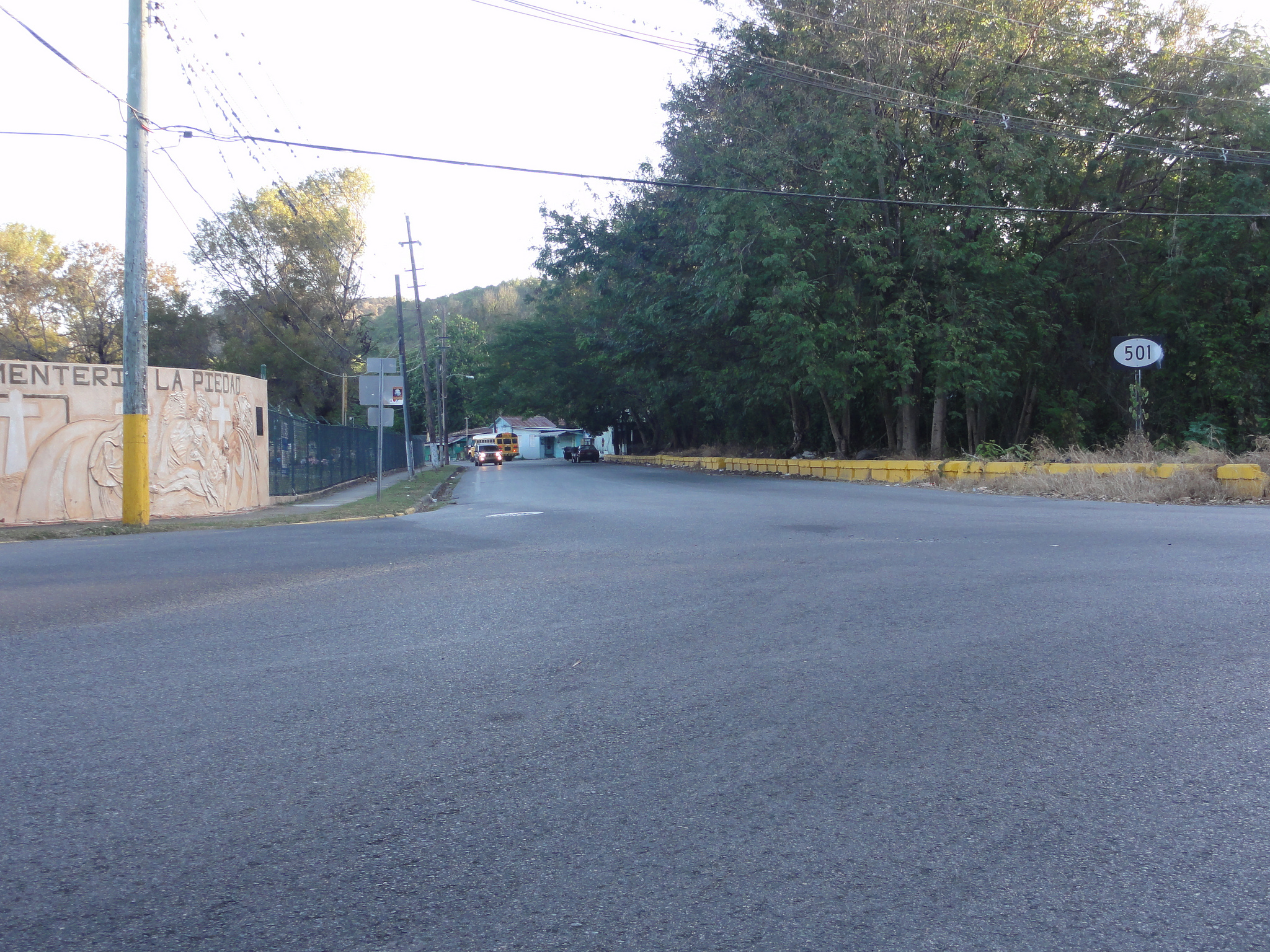
Southern terminus of PR-501 at entrance to Barrio Magueyes, Ponce

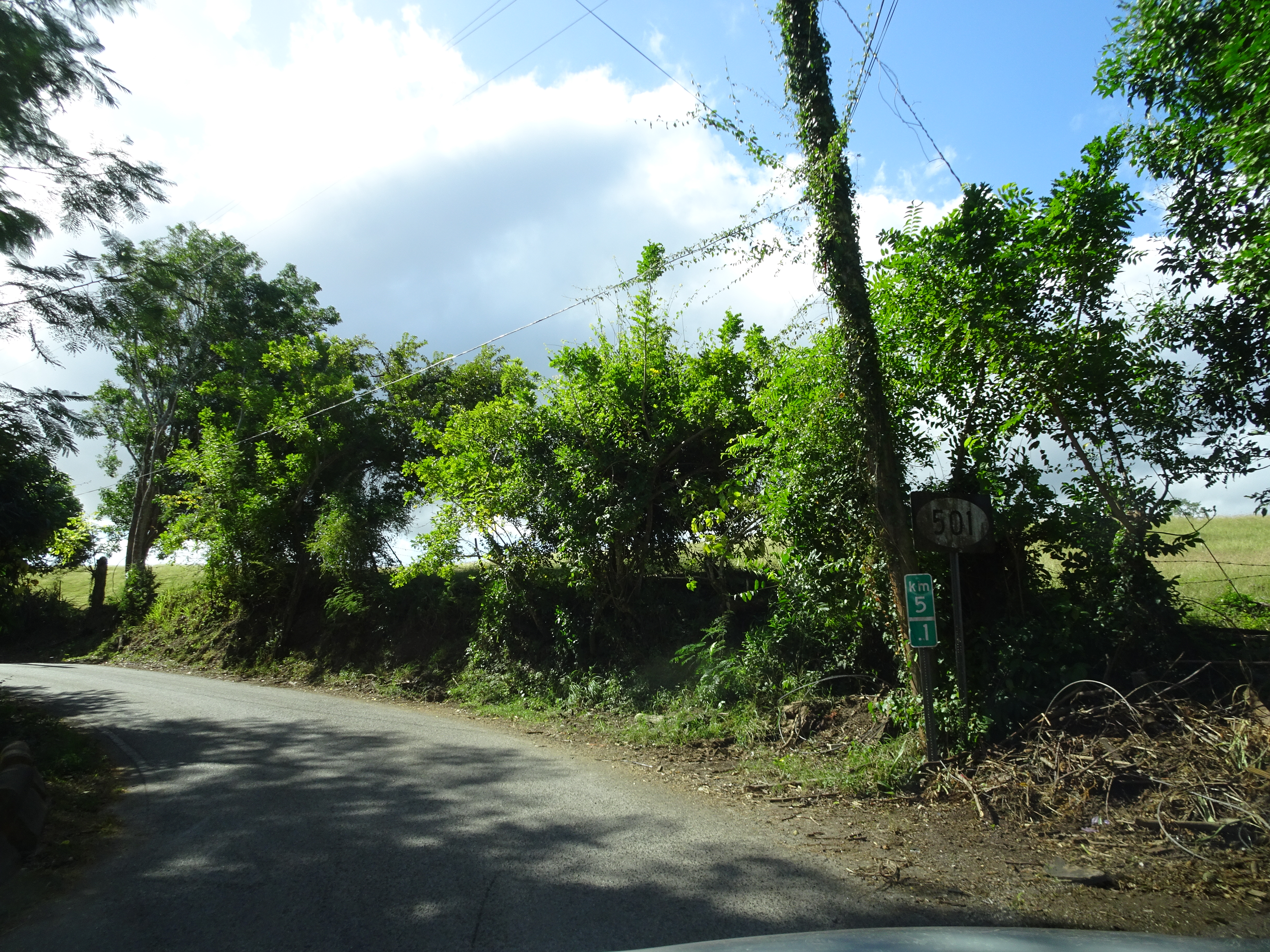
PR-501 south in Barrio Marueño

== Major intersections ==
The entire route is located in Ponce.

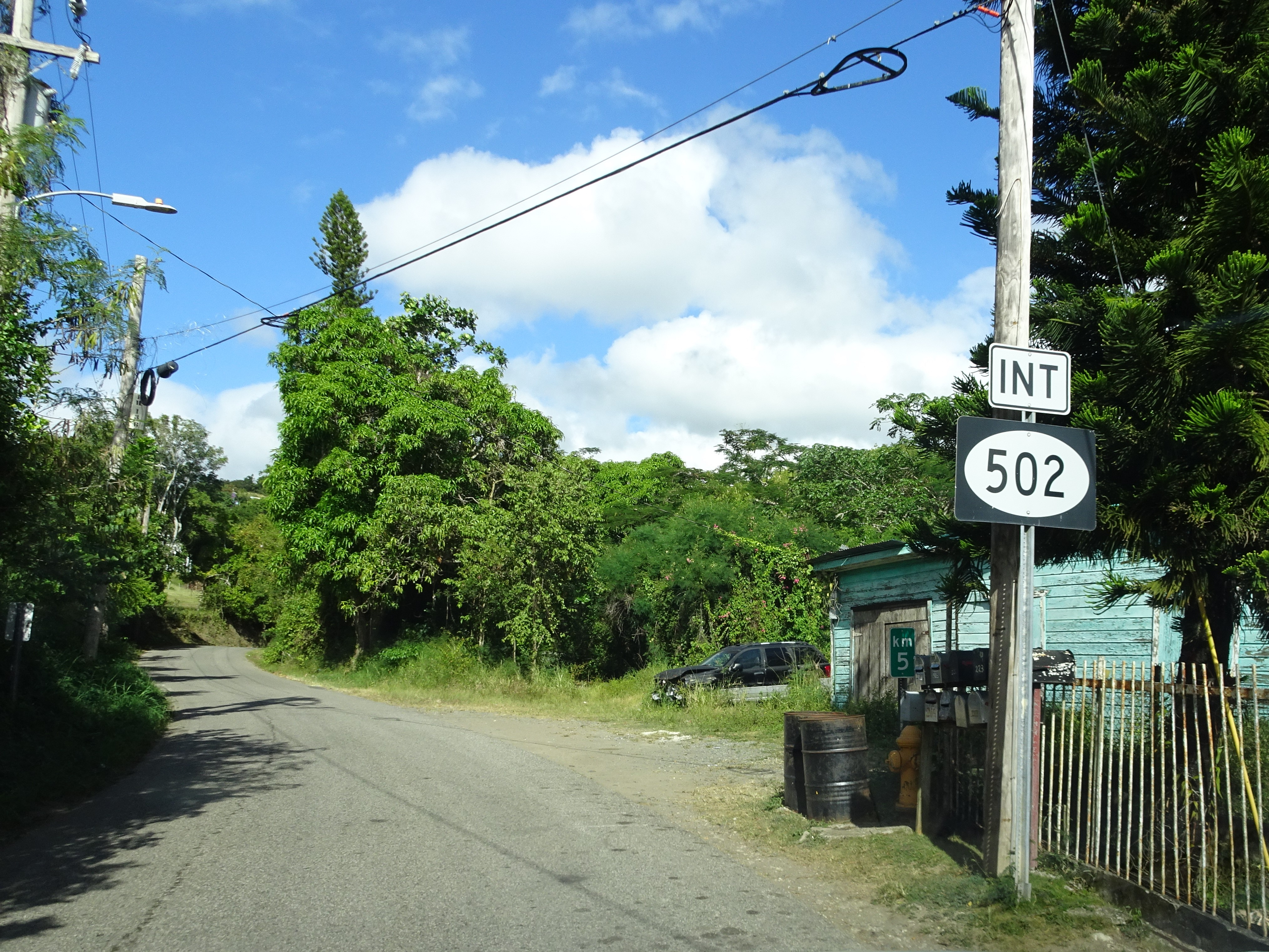
PR-501 north near PR-502 intersection in Barrio Marueño

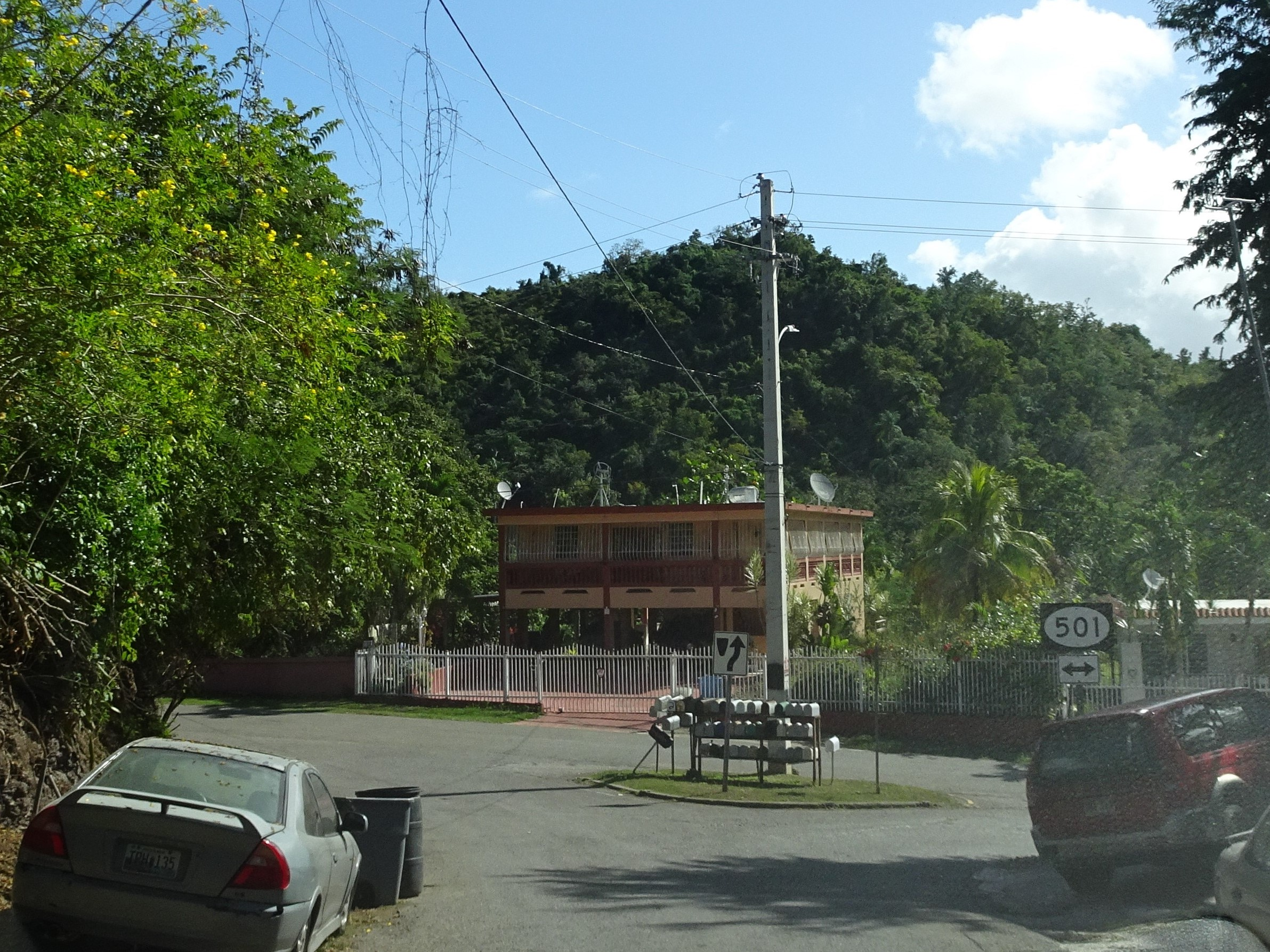
PR-502 south at PR-501 junction in Barrio Marueño

Location	km	mi	Destinations	Notes
Magueyes	0.0	0.0	PR-123 – Ponce, Adjuntas	Southern terminus of PR-501
Marueño	5.1	3.2	PR-502 – Quebrada Limón	
Marueño	8.3	5.2	PR-Sector La Jagua – Marueño	Northern terminus of southern segment; dead end road
Marueño	Gap in route			
Marueño	2.0	1.2	PR-Sector Las Lomas – Guaraguao	Southern terminus of northern segment; dead end road
Guaraguao	0.0	0.0	PR-123 – Ponce, Adjuntas	Northern terminus of PR-501
1.000 mi = 1.609 km; 1.000 km = 0.621 mi

== See also ==
- List of highways in Ponce, Puerto Rico
