= Puerto Rico Highway 591 =

Highway in Puerto Rico

Highway 591
- Ruta 591

Route information
- Maintained by Puerto Rico DTPW
- Length: 3.1 km (1.9 mi)

Major junctions
- West end: PR-2 in Canas
- East end: PR-2 in Canas

Location
- Country: United States
- Territory: Puerto Rico
- Municipalities: Ponce

Highway system
- Roads in Puerto Rico; List
← PR-588	→ PR-633

Puerto Rico Highway 591 (PR-591) is tertiary highway in Ponce, Puerto Rico. The road is located at the El Tuque sector of Barrio Canas.

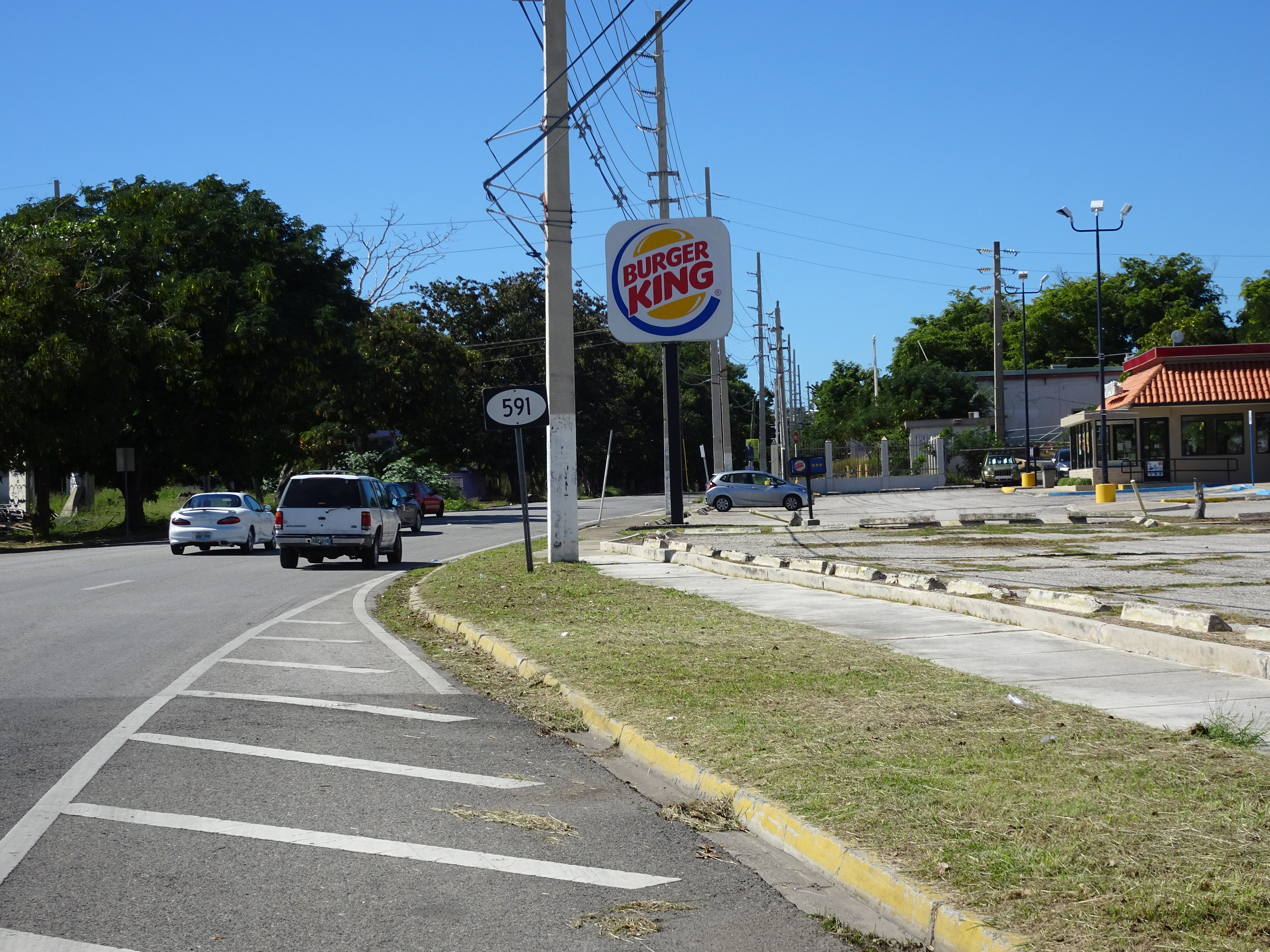
PR-591, El Tuque, Barrio Canas, Ponce, Puerto Rico, looking west

== Major intersections ==
The entire route is located in Canas, Ponce.

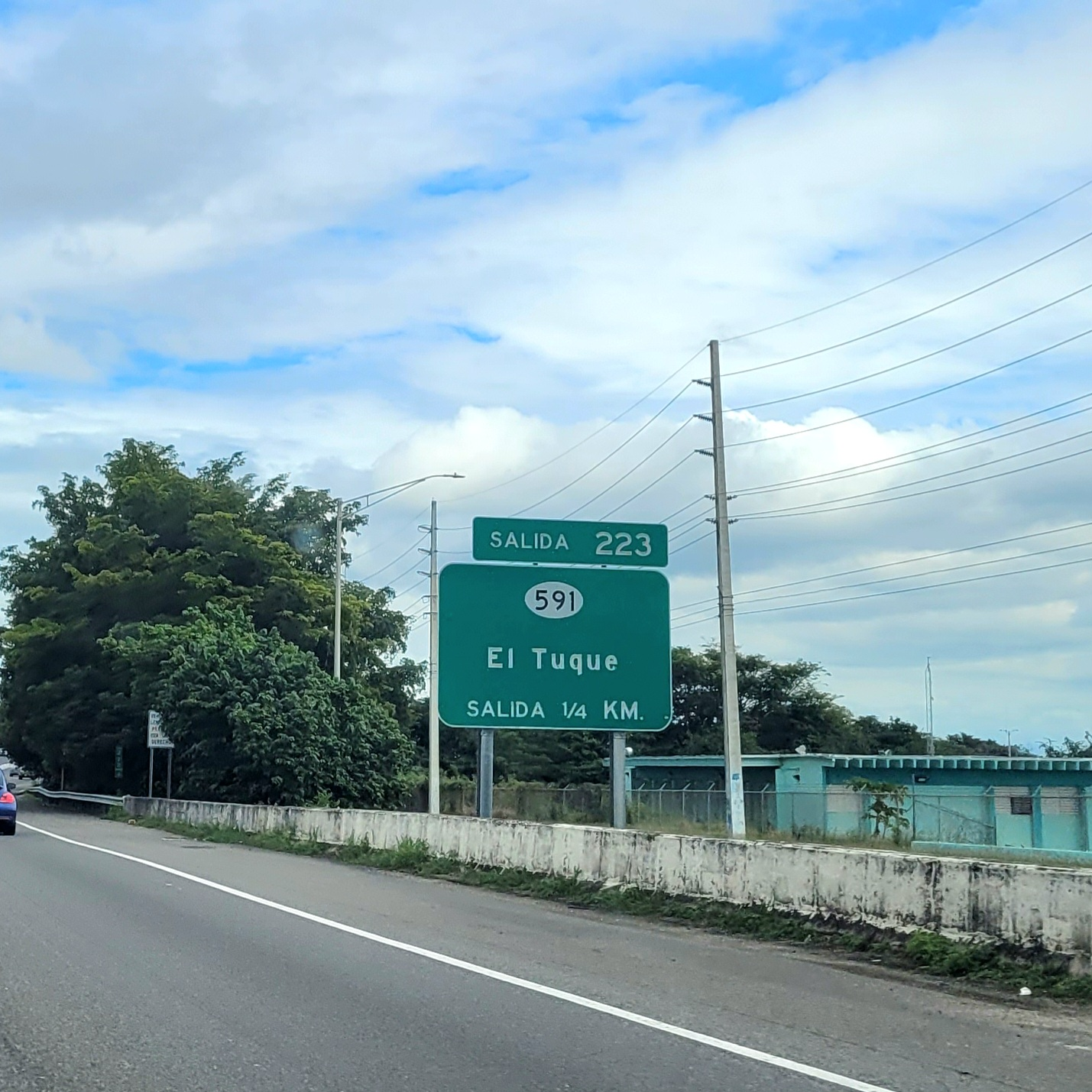
PR-2 east approaching exit 223 to PR-591 west in El Tuque

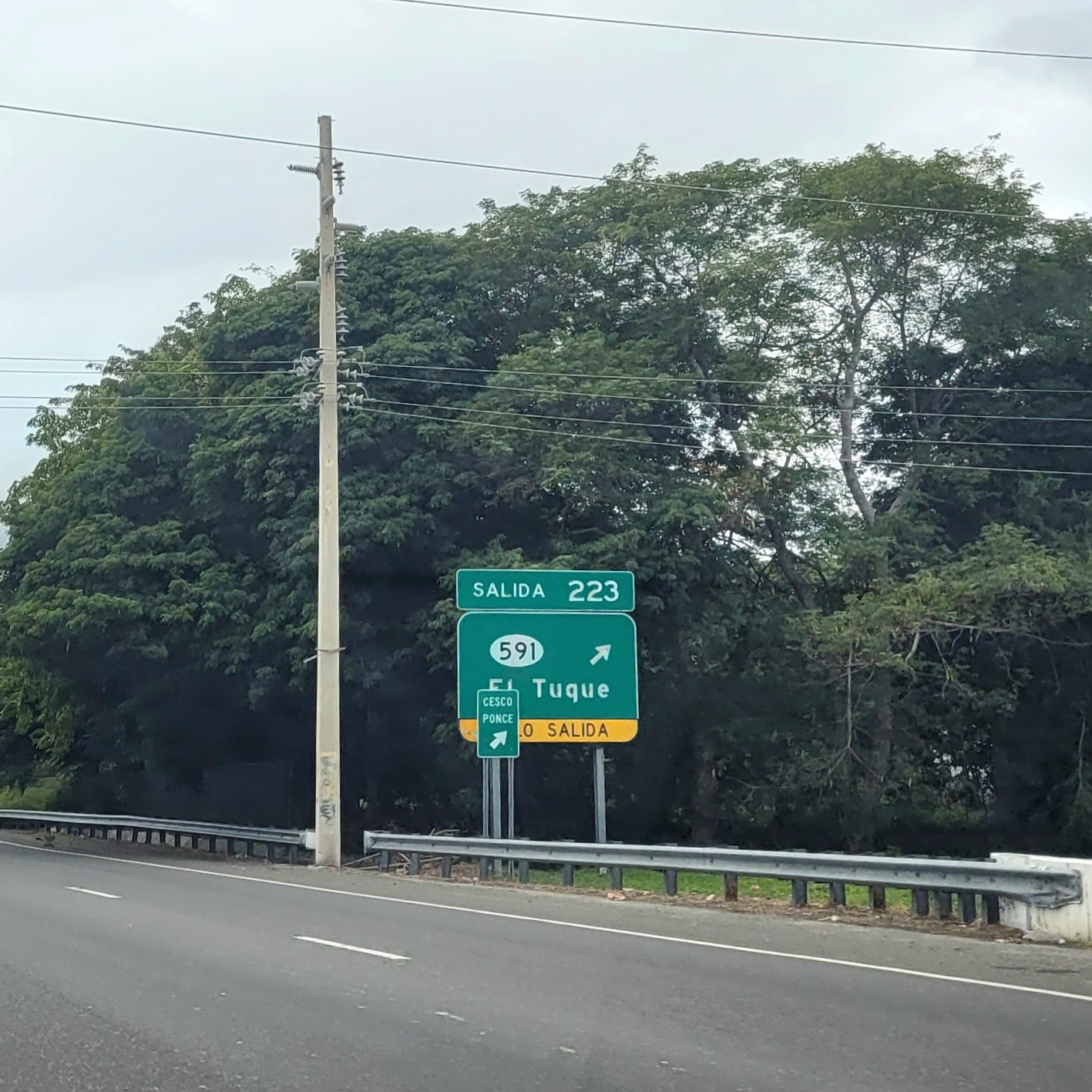
PR-2 west at exit 223 to PR-591 west in El Tuque

km	mi	Destinations	Notes
0.0	0.0	PR-2 (Expreso Roberto Sánchez Vilella) – Ponce, Mayagüez	Western terminus of PR-591; PR-2 exit 221
1.7– 1.8	1.1– 1.1	To PR-2 (Expreso Roberto Sánchez Vilella) – Ponce, San Juan	PR-2 exit 223
3.1	1.9	PR-2 (Expreso Roberto Sánchez Vilella) – Ponce	Eastern terminus of PR-591; PR-2 exit 224; PR-2 access via Avenida Punto Oro
1.000 mi = 1.609 km; 1.000 km = 0.621 mi: Incomplete access

== See also ==
- List of highways in Ponce, Puerto Rico
