= List of barrios of Ponce, Puerto Rico =

Map of the 31 barrios of Ponce

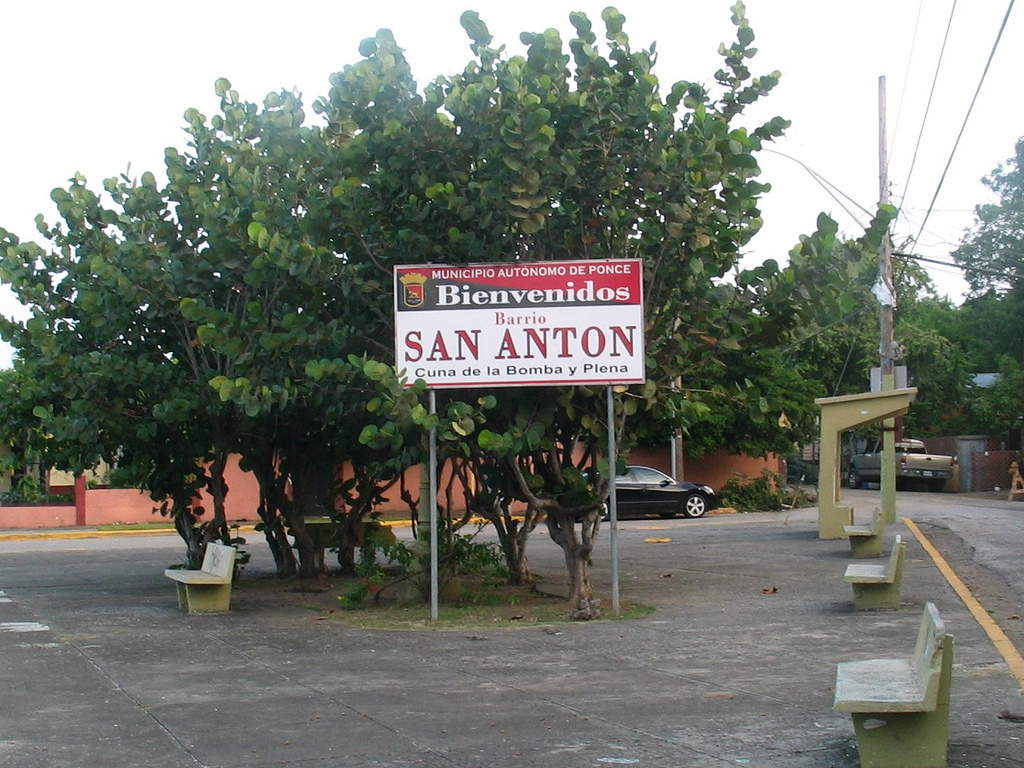
Entrance to Barrio San Antón, one of the barrios located in urban zone of the municipality

The municipality of Ponce, Puerto Rico, has 31 barrios, the largest number of barrios among all municipalities in Puerto Rico.

== Meaning of "barrio" ==
In Puerto Rico, the term barrio has two very different meanings. Officially, Ponce has 31 barrios; this is according to local, insular, and federal governments. However, there is a second meaning for barrio that does not correlate with the official meaning and one that is meant to refer, loosely, to a sector or portion of an official barrio. It is a meaning that makes reference to a community that shares certain common characteristics (types of homes, income range of its dwellers, its natural or human-made boundaries, etc.). Some examples of these so-called barrios are barrio Mameyes (a sector of barrio Portugues Urbano), barrio Corral Viejo (a community within Barrio Magueyes), barrio Clausells (a portion of Barrio Segundo), barrio Tenerías (part of Barrio Machuelo Abajo), and barrio Caracoles (a community in Barrio Canas). These so-called barrios, unlike the 31 official barrios, do not have well defined borders, and their names ordinarily reference a general, not a precise, sector or area.

== Introduction to Ponce's 31 barrios ==
The territorial areas known as barrios started to take shape during the 18th century (1700s), and the first barrios named were Cana, Montones, Capitanejo, Quebrada Limón, and Bucana. Throughout the 19th century, Ponce's jurisdictional zone increased to where it included both urban and rural barrios. With an expanding urban zone, in the 20th century Ponce's list of barrios came to number 31, with 13 located in the urban area of the city plus 18 outside the urban zone. Of these 18, and as the urban area continues to expand, seven were considered suburban in 1999. These 7 suburban barrios were: Canas, Magueyes, Portugués, Machuelo Arriba, Sabanetas, Coto Laurel, and Cerrillos. The remaining 11 are entirely rural barrios. A 2000 report by the U.S. Census Bureau provides detailed demographics statistics for each of Ponce's barrios.

From a demographics perspective, the 2000 Census showed that Montes Llanos is the least populated barrio in the municipality. Thanks to its larger area, barrio Canas was by far the most populated ward of the municipality. At 68 persons per square mile, San Patricio was the least dense, while Cuarto was the most densely populated at 18,819 persons per square mile.

Geographically speaking, Ponce has nine barrios that border neighboring municipalities. These are Anón, Canas, Capitanejo, Coto Laurel, Guaraguao, Marueño, Quebrada Limón, Real, San Patricio. Canas and Capitanejo are also coastal barrios, and together with three other coastal barrios (Playa, Bucaná, and Vayas) make up the municipality's five coastal barrios.

There are also seven barrios within the city limits (Bucana, Canas Urbano, Machuelo Abajo, Magueyes Urbano, Playa, Portugués Urbano, and San Antón) that in addition to the original six city core barrios — named Primero, Segundo, Tercero, Cuarto, Quinto, and Sexto — make up the 13 urban barrios of the municipality. The historic zone of the city is within these original six core city barrios. These twelve barrios compose what is known as the urban zone of the municipality.

The remaining eight barrios (Magueyes, Tibes, Montes Llanos, Maragüez, Portugués, Machuelo Arriba, Cerrillos, Sabanetas) are located in the interior of the municipality. These last eight are outside the city limits and are neither coastal nor bordering barrios.

== Complete list of barrios ==
A summary of all the barrios of the municipality, their population, population density, and land and water areas as given by the U.S. Census Bureau is as follows:

No.	Barrio	Population (Census 2000)	Density (/sq mi)	Total Area (sq mi)	Land Area (sq mi)	Water Area (sq mi)
1	Anón	1669	129.9	12.85	12.85	0.00
2	Bucaná	3963	2957.5	2.16	1.34	0.81
3	Canas	34065	2349.3	22.82	14.50	8.32
4	Canas Urbano	21482	9299.6	2.31	2.31	0.00
5	Capitanejo	1401	355.4	4.82	3.95	0.88
6	Cerrillos	4284	1377.5	3.31	3.11	0.20
7	Coto Laurel	5285	1492.9	3.60	3.54	0.06
8	Cuarto	3011	18818.8	0.17	0.16	0.00
9	Guaraguao	1017	247.4	4.11	4.11	0.00
10	Machuelo Abajo	13302	7515.3	1.86	1.77	0.90
11	Machuelo Arriba	13727	2124.9	6.61	6.46	0.15
12	Magueyes	6134	1345.2	4.56	4.56	0.00
13	Magueyes Urbano	1332	1074.2	1.24	1.24	0.00
14	Maragüez	754	142.0	6.42	5.31	1.11
15	Marueño	1474	350.1	4.21	4.21	0.00
16	Montes Llanos	462	214.9	2.15	2.15	0.00
17	Playa	16926	3864.4	14.98	4.38	10.60
18	Portugués Rural	4882	1386.9	3.56	3.52	0.04
19	Portugués Urbano	5886	5163.2	1.14	1.14	0.00
20	Primero	3550	14200.0	0.25	0.25	0.00
21	Quebrada Limón	804	301.1	2.67	2.67	0.00
22	Quinto	724	6581.8	0.11	0.11	0.00
23	Real	3139	595.6	5.28	5.27	0.01
24	Sabanetas	6420	2351.6	2.79	2.73	0.06
25	San Antón	11271	10063.4	1.17	1.12	0.04
26	San Patricio	465	67.8	6.86	6.86	0.00
27	Segundo	11321	17416.9	0.65	0.65	0.00
28	Sexto	4745	18250.0	0.27	0.26	0.01
29	Tercero	773	9662.5	0.08	0.08	0.00
30	Tibes	866	123.5	7.01	7.01	0.00
31	Vayas	1338	187.9	10.47	7.12	3.35
	Ponce	186475	1625.5	193.6	114.7	78.9

== Barrios in the urban zone ==
There are 13 barrios in the urban zone of the city of Ponce. These are the original six urban barrios — named Primero, Segundo, Tercero, Cuarto, Quinto, and Sexto - plus seven others that the urban area has expanded to cover as well and which, with time, were incorporated into the city limits, namely, Bucaná, Canas Urbano, Machuelo Abajo, Magueyes Urbano, Portugués Urbano, and San Antón. The historic zone of the city is within the original six urban zone barrios.

According to the 2000 Census, Cuarto - an urban barrio - was the most densely populated with 18,819 persons per square mile,

No.	Barrio	Population (Census 2000)	Density (/sq mi)	Total Area (sq mi)	Land Area (sq mi)	Water Area (sq mi)
1	Bucaná	3963	2957.5	2.16	1.34	0.81
2	Canas Urbano	21482	9299.6	2.31	2.31	0.00
3	Cuarto	3011	18818.8	0.17	0.16	0.00
4	Machuelo Abajo	13302	7515.3	1.86	1.77	0.90
5	Magueyes Urbano	1332	1074.2	1.24	1.24	0.00
6	Playa	16926	3864.4	14.98	4.38	10.60
7	Portugués Urbano	5886	5163.2	1.14	1.14	0.00
8	Primero	3550	14200.0	0.25	0.25	0.00
9	Quinto	724	6581.8	0.11	0.11	0.00
10	San Antón	11271	10063.4	1.17	1.12	0.04
11	Segundo	11321	17416.9	0.65	0.65	0.00
12	Sexto	4745	18250.0	0.27	0.26	0.01
13	Tercero	773	9662.5	0.08	0.08	0.00
	Ponce	186475	1625.5	193.6	114.7	78.9

=== Original barrios in the urban zone ===
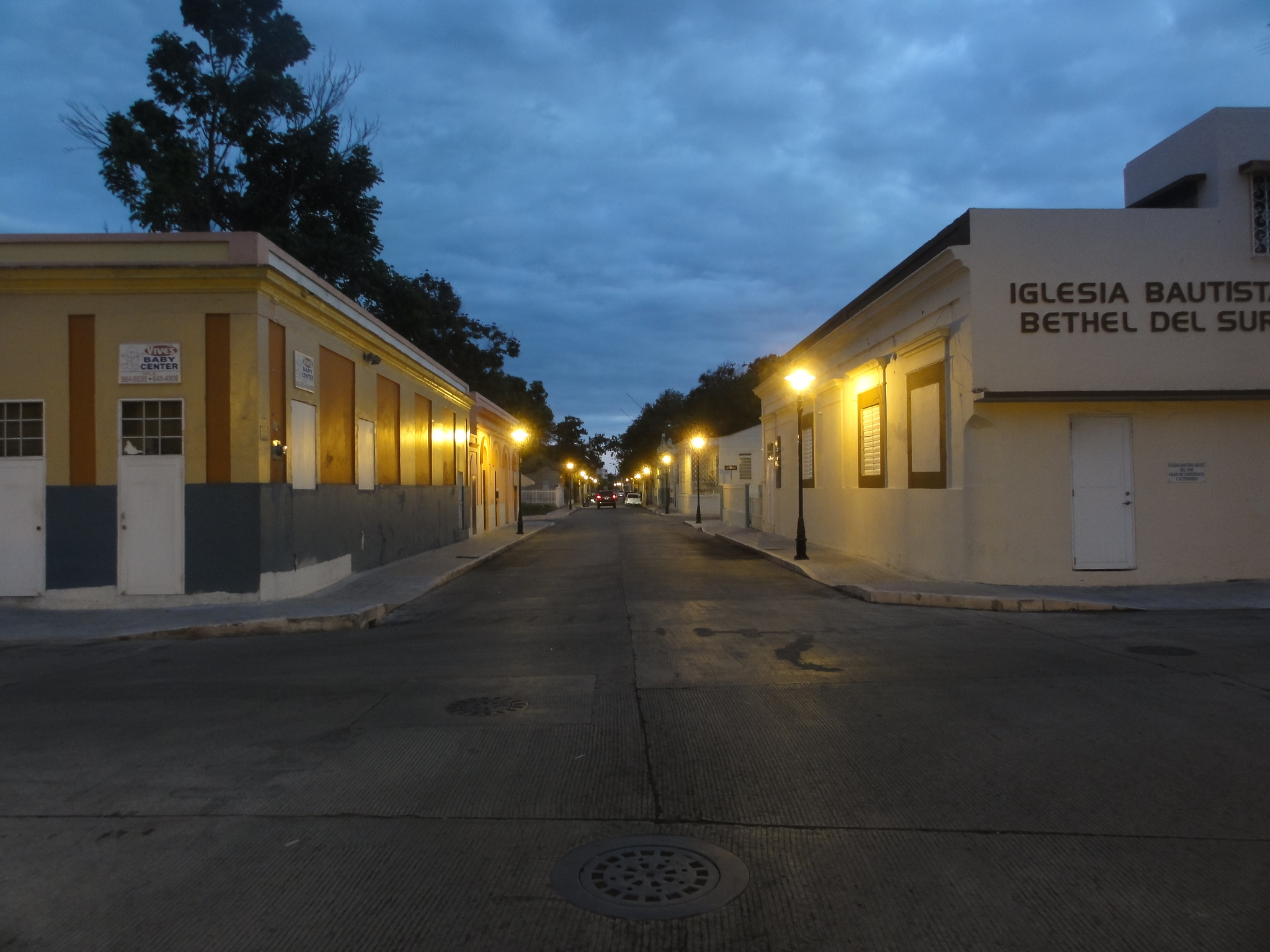
A street in Barrio Segundo, one of the original six barrios of the Ponce urban zone

When barrios were first created around 1831, the urban zone of the municipality of Ponce was divided into four barrios, centered at the intersection of Marina and Comercio streets (as it continues to be today). By 1878, barrio Quinto was added to the urban zone, and by 1898 Cantera had been renamed as barrio Sexto to take its place among the urban barrios as well. (The port of La Playa, not the entire extension of barrio Playa, was also considered an urban zone in 1898.) These six original barrios that made up the urban zone of the municipality are detailed below.

No.	Barrio	Population (Census 2000)	Density (/sq mi)	Total Area (sq mi)	Land Area (sq mi)	Water Area (sq mi)
1	Cuarto	3011	18818.8	0.17	0.16	0.00
2	Primero	3550	14200.0	0.25	0.25	0.00
3	Quinto	724	6581.8	0.11	0.11	0.00
4	Segundo	11321	17416.9	0.65	0.65	0.00
5	Sexto	4745	18250.0	0.27	0.26	0.01
6	Tercero	773	9662.5	0.08	0.08	0.00
	Ponce	186475	1625.5	193.6	114.7	78.9

== Barrios in the rural zone ==
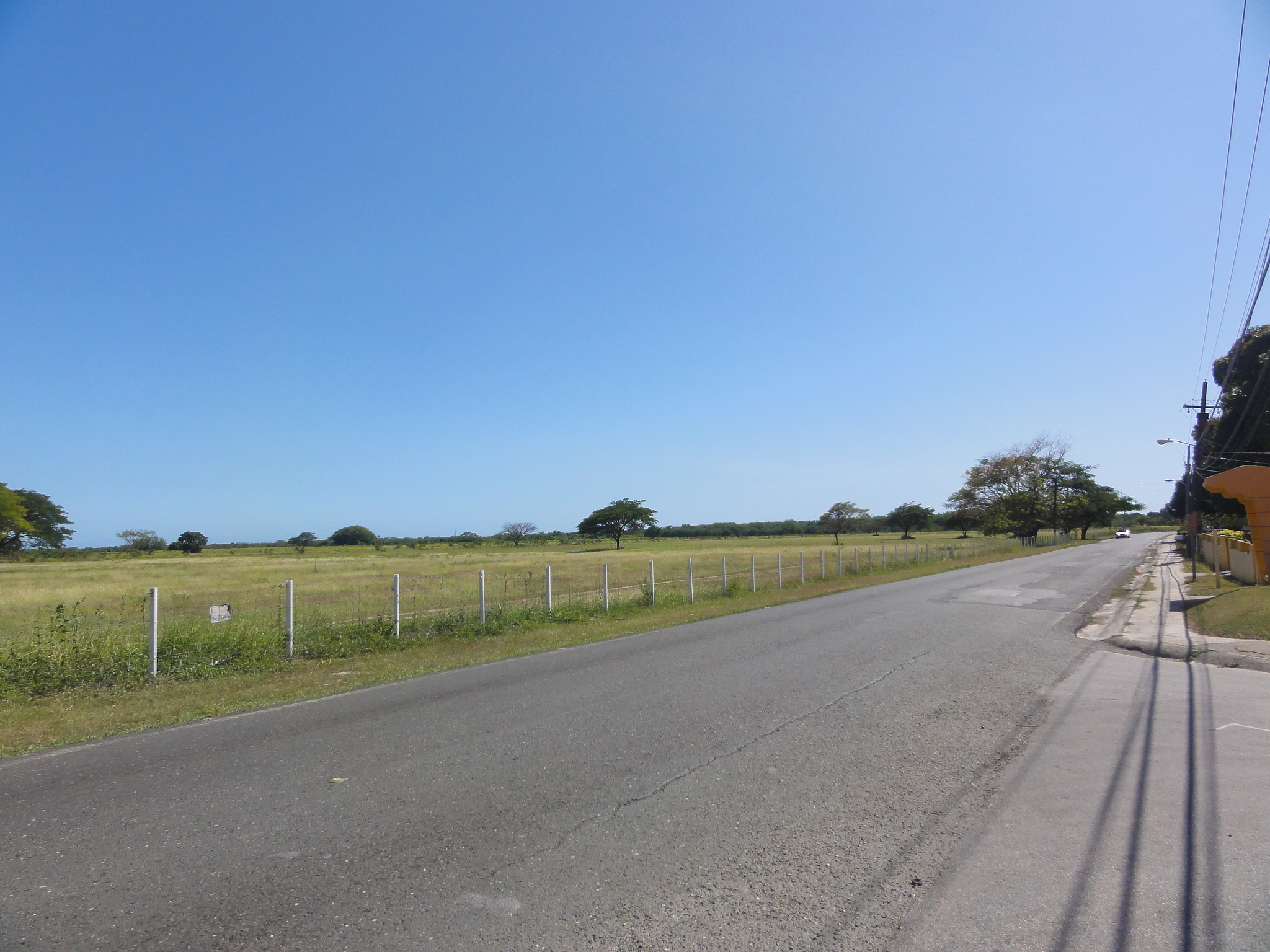
Barrio Capitanejo, one of the 18 rural barrios of the municipality of Ponce

The municipality has 18 rural barrios. The 2000 Census showed that Montes Llanos, one of the 18 rural barrios, was the least populated barrio in the municipality. At 68 persons per square mile, San Patricio - another rural barrio - was the least populated, while Cuarto was the most densely populated at 18,819 persons per square mile.

No.	Barrio	Population (Census 2000)	Density (/sq mi)	Total Area (sq mi)	Land Area (sq mi)	Water Area (sq mi)
1	Anón	1669	129.9	12.85	12.85	0.00
2	Canas	34065	2349.3	22.82	14.50	8.32
3	Capitanejo	1401	355.4	4.82	3.95	0.88
4	Cerrillos	4284	1377.5	3.31	3.11	0.20
5	Coto Laurel	5285	1492.9	3.60	3.54	0.06
6	Guaraguao	1017	247.4	4.11	4.11	0.00
7	Machuelo Arriba	13727	2124.9	6.61	6.46	0.15
8	Magueyes	6134	1345.2	4.56	4.56	0.00
9	Maragüez	754	142.0	6.42	5.31	1.11
10	Marueño	1474	350.1	4.21	4.21	0.00
11	Montes Llanos	462	214.9	2.15	2.15	0.00
12	Portugués	4882	1386.9	3.56	3.52	0.04
13	Quebrada Limón	804	301.1	2.67	2.67	0.00
14	Real	3139	595.6	5.28	5.27	0.01
15	Sabanetas	6420	2351.6	2.79	2.73	0.06
16	San Patricio	465	67.8	6.86	6.86	0.00
17	Tibes	866	123.5	7.01	7.01	0.00
18	Vayas	1338	187.9	10.47	7.12	3.35
	Ponce	186475	1625.5	193.6	114.7	78.9

== Suburban barrios ==
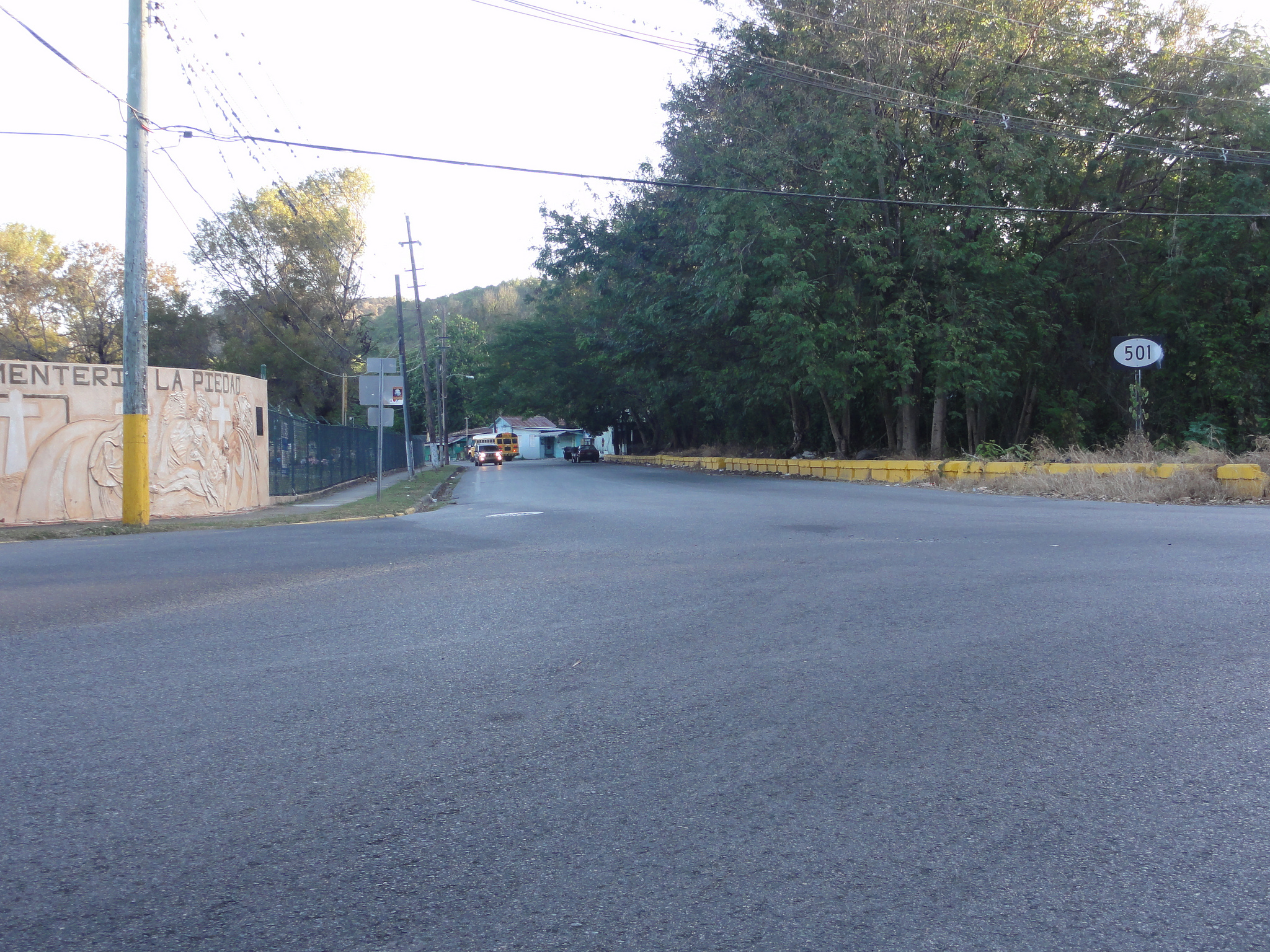
A scene in Barrio Magueyes, one of seven suburban barrios in the municipality

Of the 18 barrios outside the Ponce urban zone, seven were considered suburban in 1999. The suburban barrios were: Canas, Magueyes, Portugues, Machuelo Arriba, Sabanetas, Coto Laurel, and Cerrillos. A 2000 report by the U.S. Census Bureau provides detailed demographics statistics for each of Ponce's barrios. Thanks to its larger area, barrio Canas was by far the most populated ward of the municipality.

No.	Barrio	Population (Census 2000)	Density (/sq mi)	Total Area (sq mi)	Land Area (sq mi)	Water Area (sq mi)
1	Canas	34065	2349.3	22.82	14.50	8.32
2	Cerrillos	4284	1377.5	3.31	3.11	0.20
3	Coto Laurel	5285	1492.9	3.60	3.54	0.06
4	Machuelo Arriba	13727	2124.9	6.61	6.46	0.15
5	Magueyes	6134	1345.2	4.56	4.56	0.00
6	Portugués	4882	1386.9	3.56	3.52	0.04
7	Sabanetas	6420	2351.6	2.79	2.73	0.06
	Ponce	186475	1625.5	193.6	114.7	78.9

== Bordering barrios ==
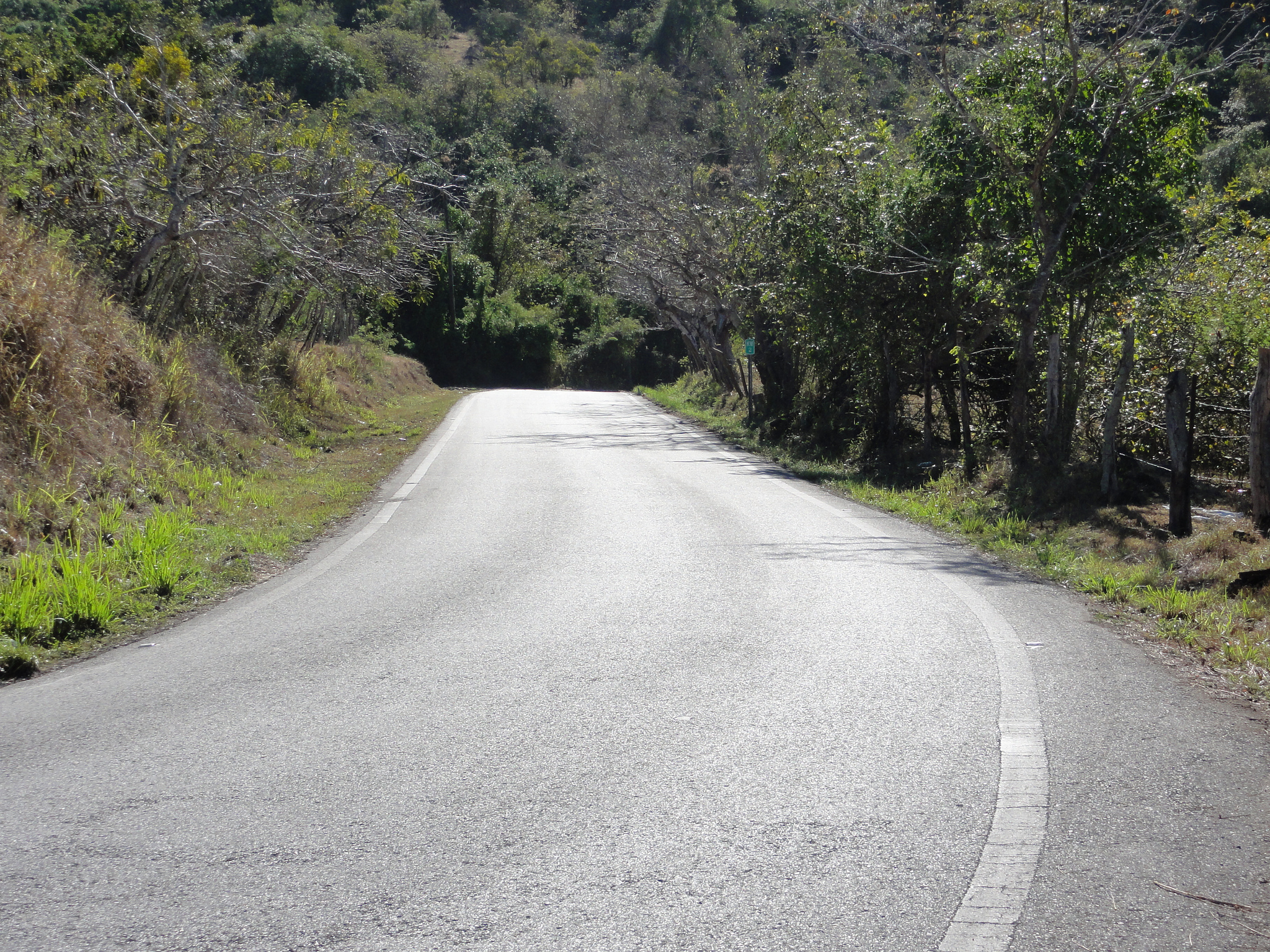
A stretch of a road (PR-502) in Barrio Quebrada Limon near its border with the municipality of Peñuelas

Ponce has nine barrios that border neighboring municipalities. These are Canas (borders Peñuelas), Quebrada Limón (borders Peñuelas), Marueño (borders Peñuelas), Guaraguao (borders Peñuelas and Adjuntas), San Patricio (borders Adjuntas, Utuado, and Jayuya), Anón (borders Jayuya and Juana Diaz), Real (borders Juana Diaz), Coto Laurel (borders Juana Diaz), and Capitanejo (borders Juana Diaz). Canas and Capitanejo are also coastal barrios, and together with three others (Playa, Bucaná, and Vayas) make up the municipality's five coastal barrios.

No.	Barrio	Population (Census 2000)	Density (/sq mi)	Total Area (sq mi)	Land Area (sq mi)	Water Area (sq mi)
1	Anón	1669	129.9	12.85	12.85	0.00
2	Canas	34065	2349.3	22.82	14.50	8.32
3	Capitanejo	1401	355.4	4.82	3.95	0.88
4	Coto Laurel	5285	1492.9	3.60	3.54	0.06
5	Guaraguao	1017	247.4	4.11	4.11	0.00
6	Marueño	1474	350.1	4.21	4.21	0.00
7	Quebrada Limón	804	301.1	2.67	2.67	0.00
8	Real	3139	595.6	5.28	5.27	0.01
9	San Patricio	465	67.8	6.86	6.86	0.00
	Ponce	186475	1625.5	193.6	114.7	78.9

== Coastal barrios ==
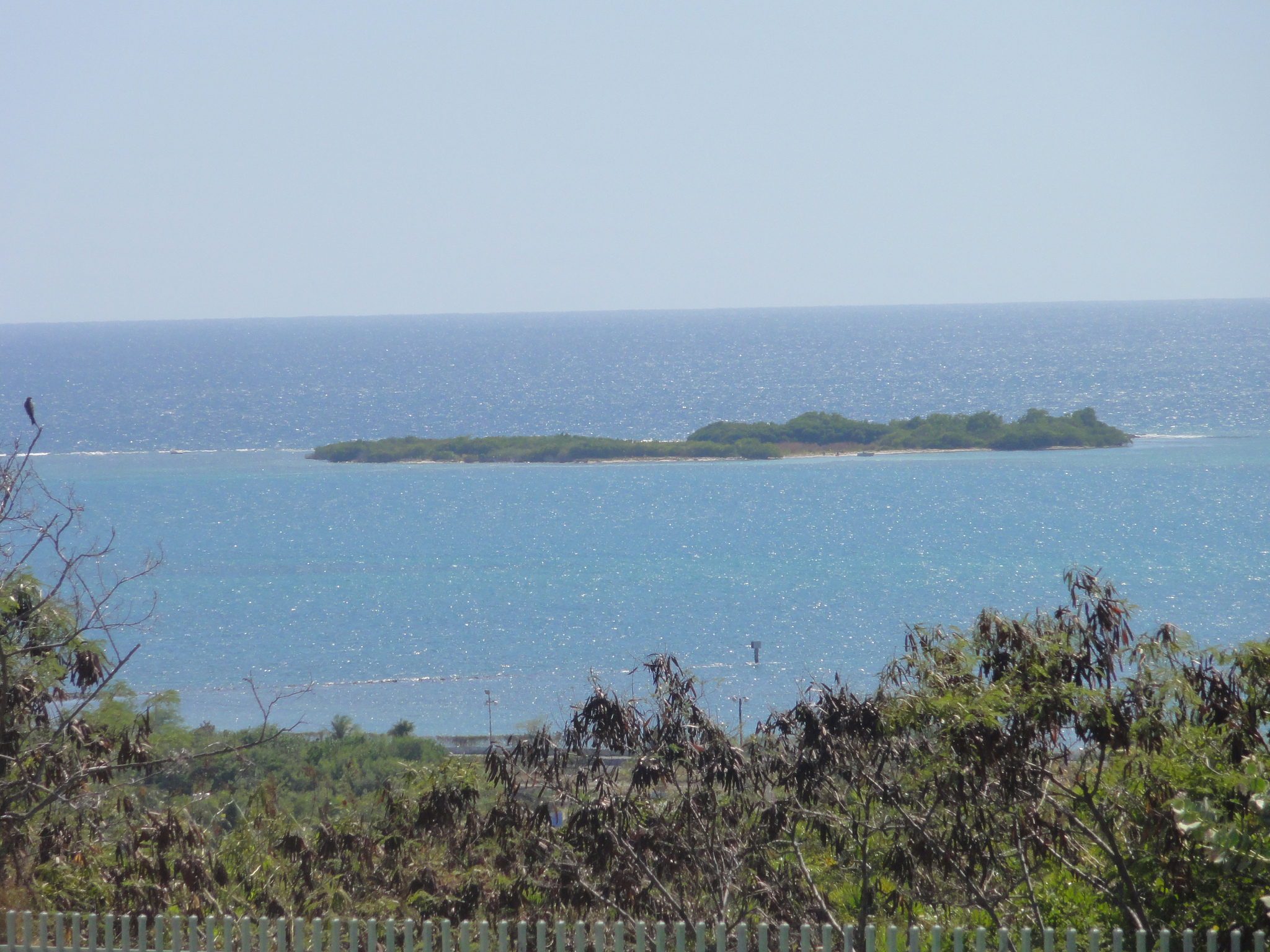
A view of Isla Ratones on the Caribbean Sea, viewed from coastal Barrio Canas

Ponce has five barrios that face the Caribbean Sea. These are: Bucaná, Canas, Capitanejo, Playa, and Vayas. These five make up the municipality's coastal barrios. Two of these—Canas and Capitanejo—are also bordering barrios.

No.	Barrio	Population (Census 2000)	Density (/sq mi)	Total Area (sq mi)	Land Area (sq mi)	Water Area (sq mi)
1	Bucaná	3963	2957.5	2.16	1.34	0.81
2	Canas	34065	2349.3	22.82	14.50	8.32
3	Capitanejo	1401	355.4	4.82	3.95	0.88
4	Playa	16926	3864.4	14.98	4.38	10.60
5	Vayas	1338	187.9	10.47	7.12	3.35
	Ponce	186475	1625.5	193.6	114.7	78.9

== Interior barrios ==
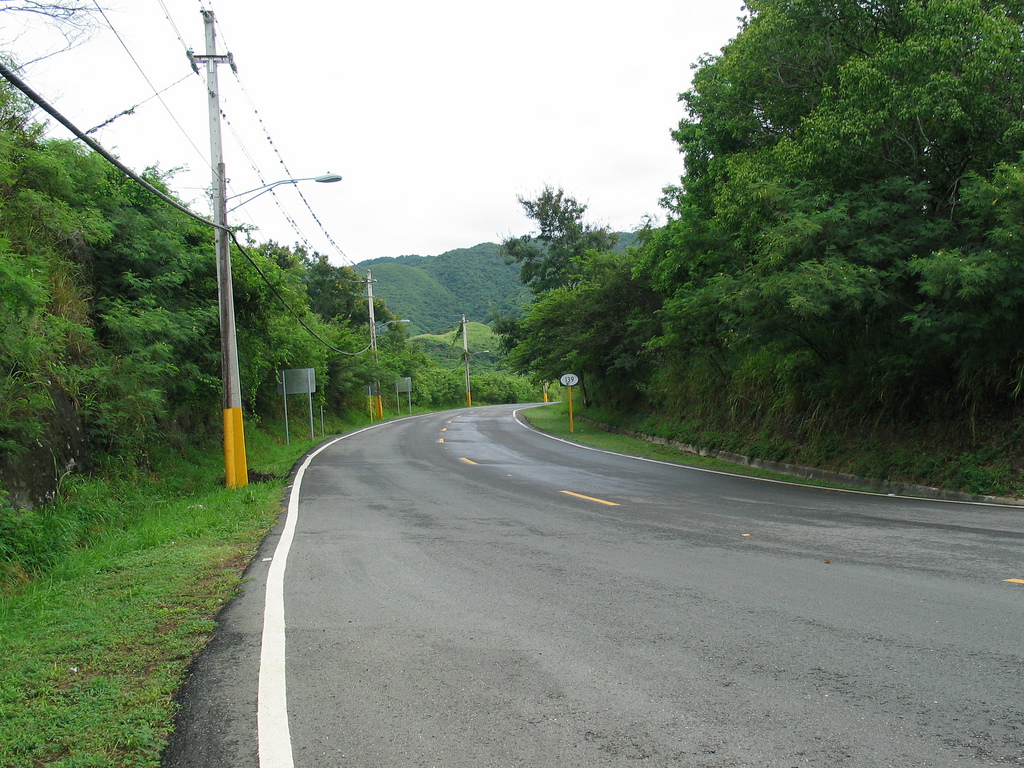
Route PR-139 in interior Barrio Cerrillos

The municipality has eight barrios -- Cerrillos, Machuelo Arriba, Magueyes, Maragüez, Montes Llanos, Portugués, Sabanetas, Tibes—that are located entirely in the interior of the municipality. '"Interior" here means that these are non urban zone barrios which border neither the Caribbean Sea nor adjacent municipalities.

No.	Barrio	Population (Census 2000)	Density (/sq mi)	Total Area (sq mi)	Land Area (sq mi)	Water Area (sq mi)
1	Cerrillos	4284	1377.5	3.31	3.11	0.20
2	Machuelo Arriba	13727	2124.9	6.61	6.46	0.15
3	Magueyes	6134	1345.2	4.56	4.56	0.00
4	Maragüez	754	142.0	6.42	5.31	1.11
5	Montes Llanos	462	214.9	2.15	2.15	0.00
6	Portugués	4882	1386.9	3.56	3.52	0.04
7	Sabanetas	6420	2351.6	2.79	2.73	0.06
8	Tibes	866	123.5	7.01	7.01	0.00
	Ponce	186475	1625.5	193.6	114.7	78.9

== See also ==
- List of communities in Puerto Rico
