= Real, Ponce, Puerto Rico =

Barrio of Puerto Rico

Real
- Barrio
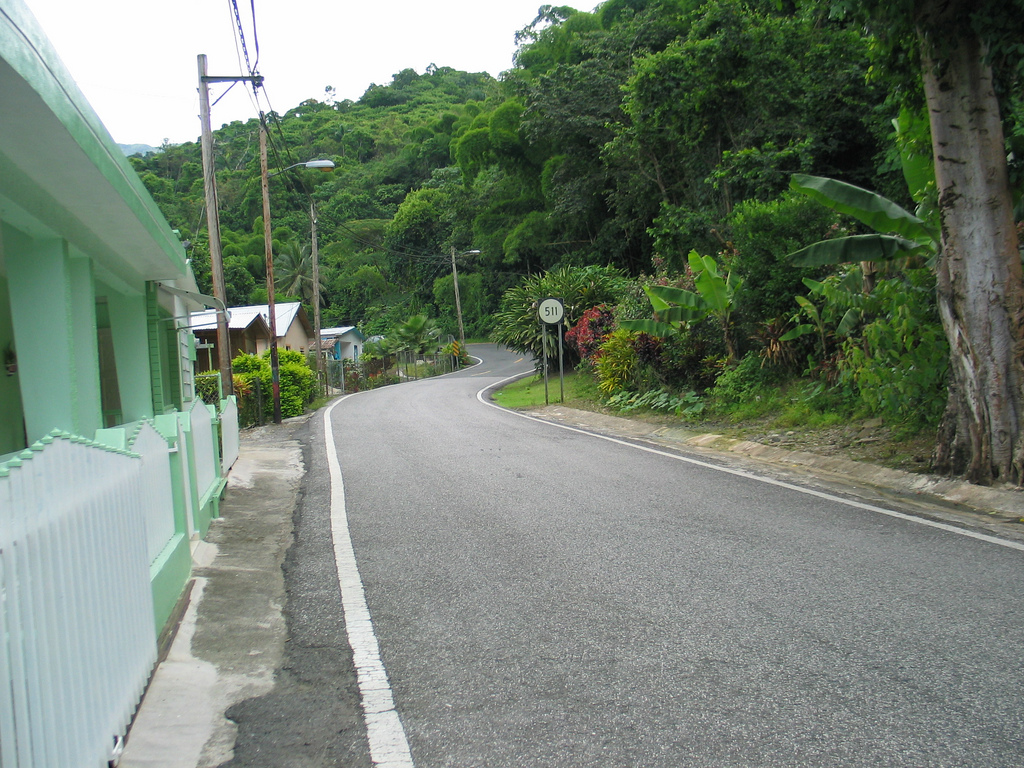
- A section of rural Barrio Real in Ponce, Puerto Rico, along Route PR-511.

- Location of barrio Real within the municipality of Ponce shown in red
- Coordinates: 18°05′43″N 66°33′24″W
- Commonwealth: Puerto Rico
- Municipality: Ponce

Area
  - Total: 5.27 sq mi (13.6 km^{2})
  - Land: 5.22 sq mi (13.5 km^{2})
  - Water: 0.05 sq mi (0.13 km^{2})
- Elevation: 469 ft (143 m)

Population (2010)
  - Total: 3,696
  - Density: 708/sq mi (273/km^{2})
- Source: 2010 Census

Real is one of the 31 barrios of the municipality of Ponce, Puerto Rico. Along with Anón, Coto Laurel, Guaraguao, Quebrada Limón, Marueño, and San Patricio, and the coastal barrios of Canas and Capitanejo, Real is one of the municipality's nine bordering barrios. It borders the municipality of Juana Diaz. It was founded in 1878.

== Location ==
Real is a rural barrio located in the eastern section of the municipality, northeast of the city of Ponce. The toponymy, or origin of the name, is a proper noun related to the "Criadero Real", a barn and slaughterhouse dedicated to the farming of slaughter of cattle.

== Boundaries ==
Real is bounded on the North by the hills north of La Compuesta street and Las Mesas Road, on the South by Río Inabon, on the West by the hills west of Rio Inabon, Rio Inabon itself (in the area of just north of Lago Numero 1), and the western and southern shores of Lago Numero 1, the eastern shore of Lago Numero 2, and the northeastern shore of Lago Numero 5, and on the East by Agustinillo Hill, the hills east of Rio Inabon, La Ponceña Brook, and the western shore of Lago Ponceña.

In terms of barrio-to-barrio boundaries, Real is bounded on the north by barrio Anón and by barrios Collores and Callabo of the municipality of Juana Díaz, in the south by barrios Cerrillos and Coto Laurel, in the west by barrios Cerrillos and Maragüez, and in the east by the municipality of Juana Díaz.

== Features and demographics ==
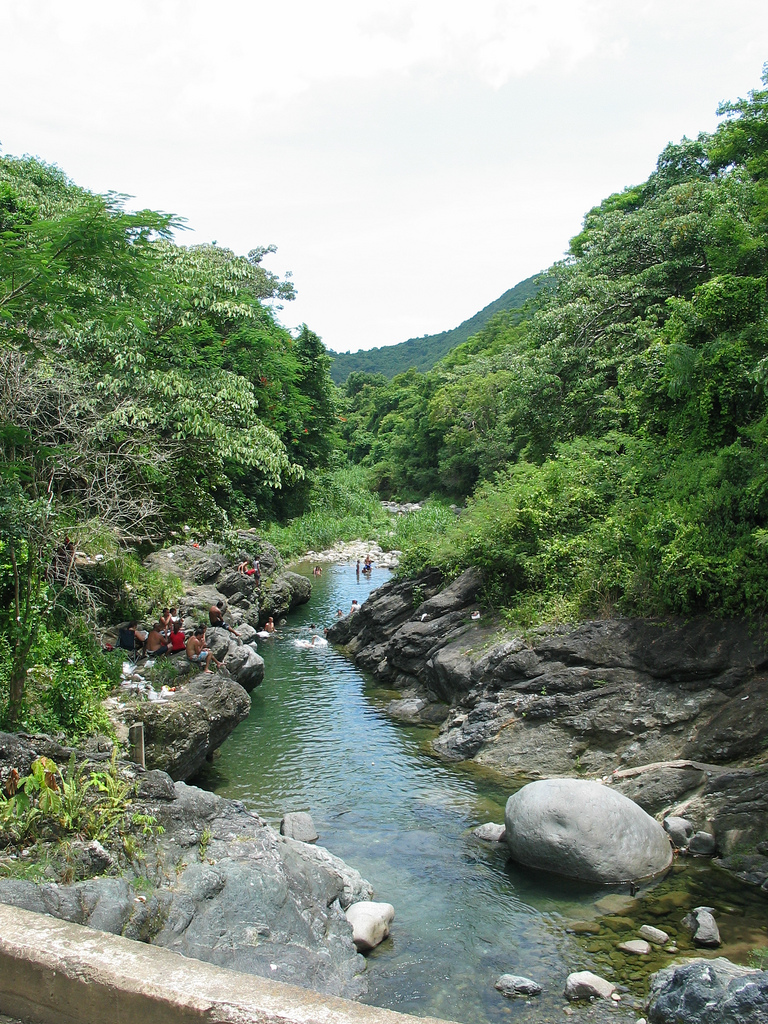
People swimming and socializing on Rio Inabon in Barrio Real

Real has 5.3 square miles (14 km^{2}) of land area and no water area. In 2000, the population of Real was 3,139. The population density in Real was 596 persons per square mile.

In 2010, the population of Real was 3,696 persons, and it had a density of 708 persons per square mile.

The communities of Las Mesas, Ponton, Real Arriba, Haciendas del Real, Mandry, Estancias del Real, Real Abajo, and Sombras del Real are located in barrio Real. There is also a sector of Barrio Real called "Anon", but this should not be confused with Anón the barrio proper.

The main road serving barrio Real is PR-511. PR-14 also briefly brushes the barrio on its southern edge.

The highest point in Barrio Real is Cerro Agustinillo which 1,906 feet.

Historical population
Census	Pop.	Note	%±
1900	1,440		—
1910	1,434		−0.4%
1920	1,672		16.6%
1930	1,514		−9.4%
1940	1,612		6.5%
1950	1,880		16.6%
1960	1,759		−6.4%
1970	1,696		−3.6%
1980	2,464		45.3%
1990	2,560		3.9%
2000	3,139		22.6%
2010	3,696		17.7%
U.S. Decennial Census; 1899 (shown as 1900) 1910-1930; 1930-1950 1960 1980-2000 2010

== Landmarks ==
Real is home to Vista Alegre Lake.

== See also ==
- List of communities in Puerto Rico
