= Peñón de Ponce =

Hill in Ponce, Puerto Rico

- Location within Puerto Rico

Highest point
- Elevation: 335 ft (102 m)
- Prominence
- Coordinates: 17°58′47.4594″N 66°41′54.4806″W

Geography
- Location: Ponce, Puerto Rico

Climbing
- Easiest route: PR-2, km 220.1, Sector Las Cucharas, Barrio Canas, Ponce, Puerto Rico

Peñón de Ponce is a boulder in the municipality of Ponce, Puerto Rico, located in the western coastal section of the municipality, in Sector Punta Cucharas, Barrio Canas, immediately north of Puerto Rico Highway 2 (PR-2), kilometer 220.1. The Peñón de Ponce promontory separates the Port of Tallaboa from the plains that give access to the municipality of Ponce.

== History ==
The hill has been on record at least since 1788 when Íñigo Abbad used it to describe the distance (2 leguas, or 2 hours walking distance) to the village of Ponce relative to this landmark feature.

== Location and geology ==
The hill is located at coordinates 17° 58' 47.5", -66° 41' 54.5", in an area known to Ponce Cement for its limestone value. There is a correctional center and a Holiday Inn Hotel on neighboring hills.

== Poem ==
In 1855, poet Federico Matos, father of Felix Matos Bernier and Rafael Matos Bernier, composed the following short poem in Spanish about this hill. The poem, titled "En el Peñón de Ponce", appeared on the 22 May 1858 issue of El Fénix newspaper in Ponce, and was dedicated to Matos's friend Martin Travieso.

En el Peñón de Ponce

"Meditación, El fastidio y el dolor. Al bello sexo, Las Crinolinas. A Cartagena, El Peñón de Ponce."	"Reflection, Nuisance and pain. To the beautiful sex, The Crinolines. To Cartagena, The Peñón de Ponce."
