= Puerto Rico Highway 502 =

Highway in Puerto Rico

Highway 502
- Ruta 502

Route information
- Maintained by Puerto Rico DTPW
- Length: 5.2 km (3.2 mi)

Major junctions
- South end: PR-132 in Canas
- PR-520 in Quebrada Limón
- North end: PR-501 in Marueño

Location
- Country: United States
- Territory: Puerto Rico
- Municipalities: Ponce

Highway system
- Roads in Puerto Rico; List
← PR-501	→ PR-503

Puerto Rico Highway 502 (PR-502) is a tertiary state highway in Ponce, Puerto Rico. The road runs north to south through barrio Quebrada Limón. Its southern terminus is at an intersection with PR-132. Its northern terminus is at its intersection with PR-501.

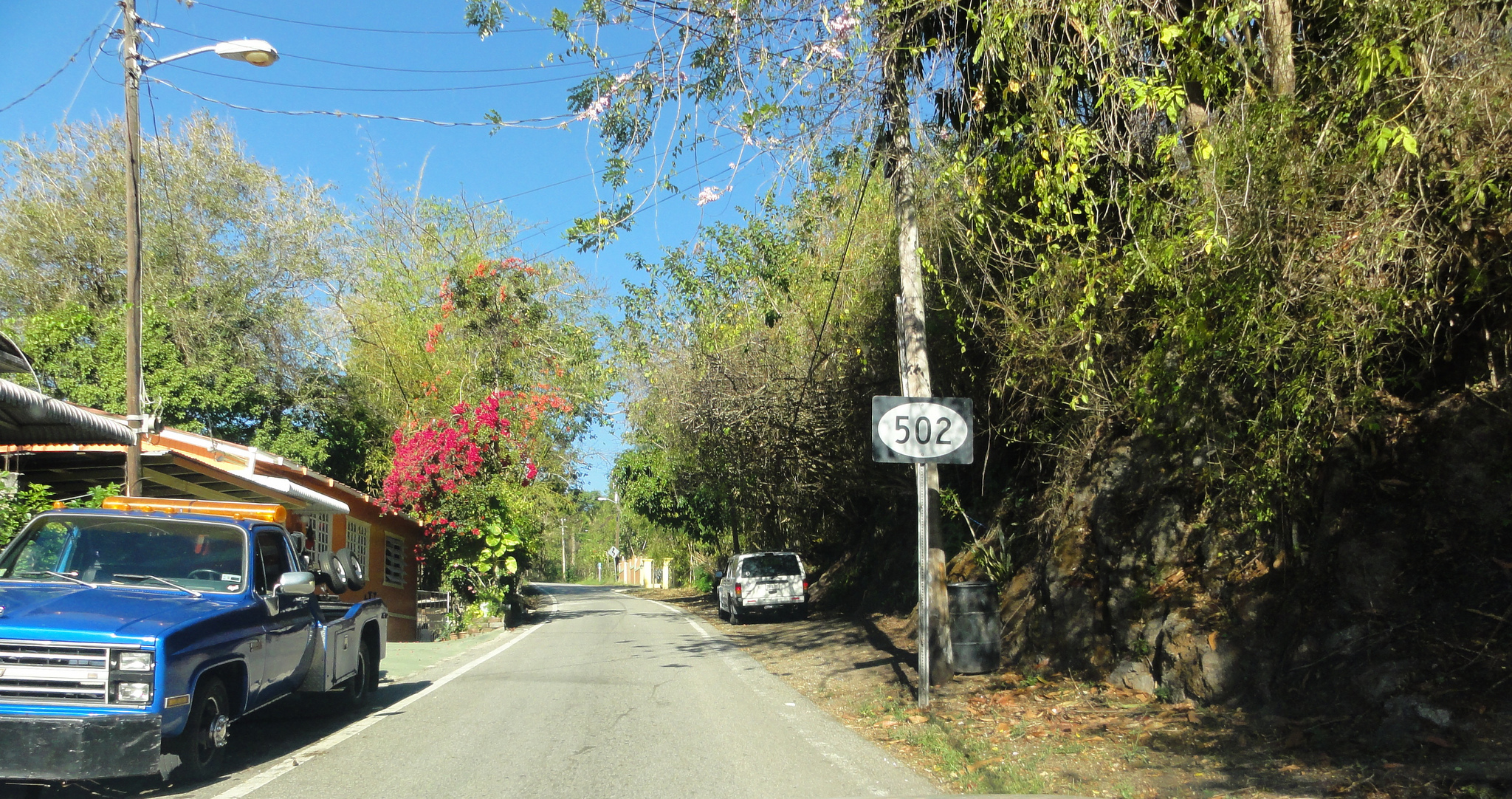
Scene on PR-502 in Barrio Marueño, Ponce, PR

== Major intersections ==
The entire route is located in Ponce.

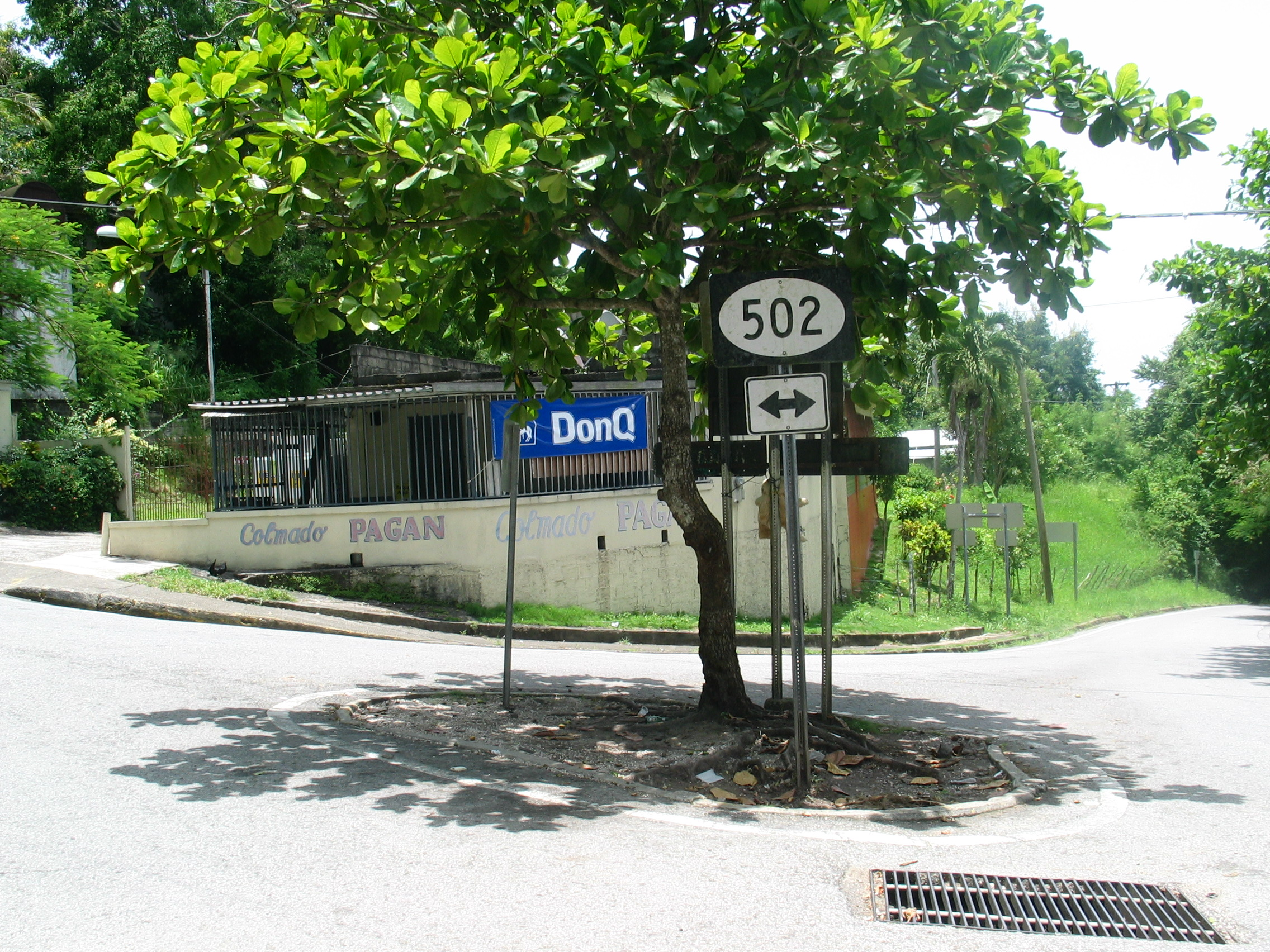
PR-502 traveling southbound in Barrio Quebrada Limon, Ponce, PR

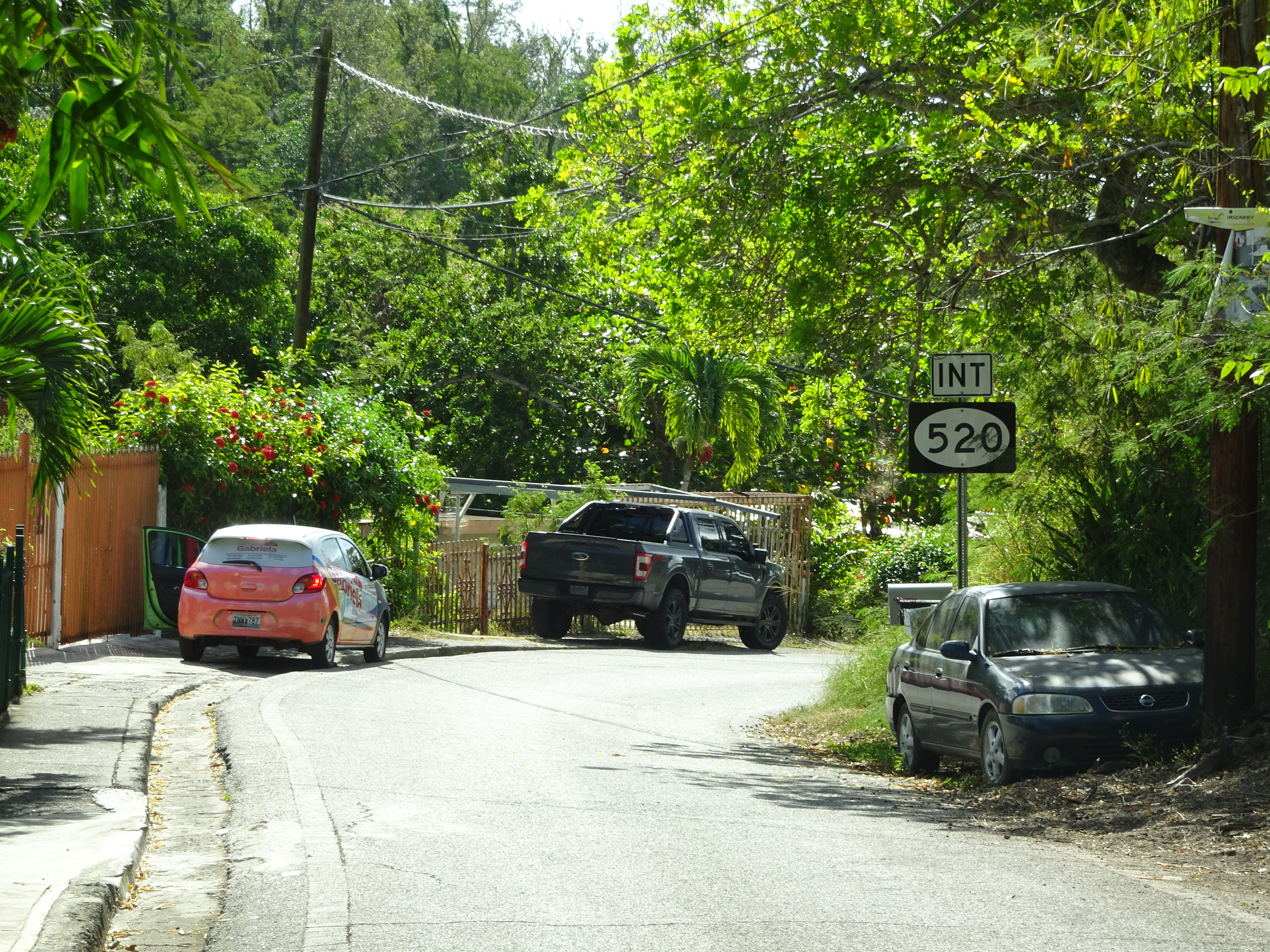
PR-502 near its junction with PR-520 in Barrio Quebrada Limón

Location	km	mi	Destinations	Notes
Canas	0.0	0.0	PR-132 – Ponce, Peñuelas	Southern terminus of PR-502
Quebrada Limón	4.7	2.9	PR-520 – Quebrada Limón	
Marueño	5.2	3.2	PR-501 – Ponce	Northern terminus of PR-502
1.000 mi = 1.609 km; 1.000 km = 0.621 mi

== See also ==
- List of highways in Ponce, Puerto Rico
