= Marueño =

Barrio of Ponce, Puerto Rico

- Barrio
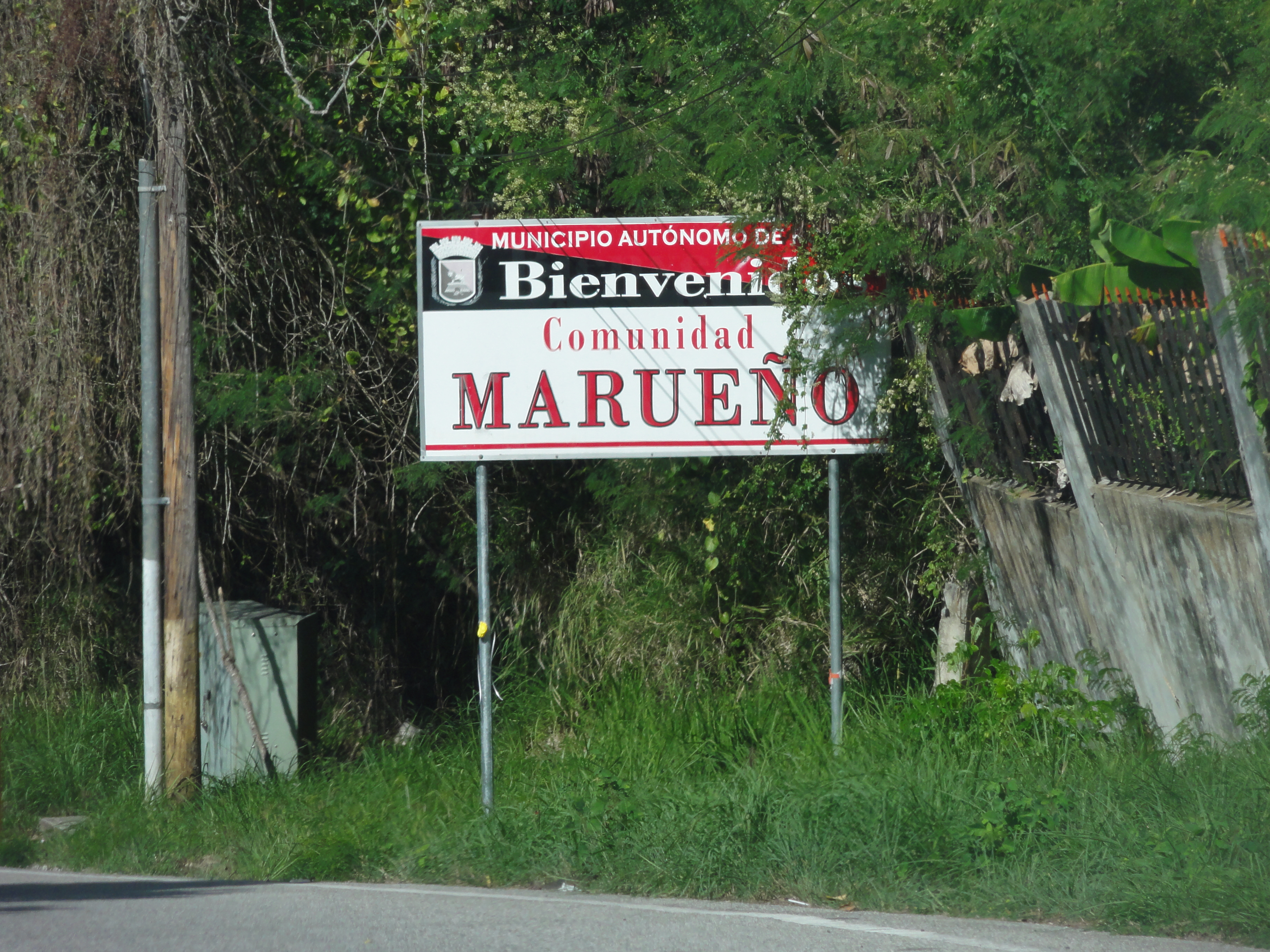
- Sign marking the entrance to the main urban community in Barrio Marueño

- Location of barrio Marueño within the municipality of Ponce shown in red

- Location of Puerto Rico
- Coordinates: 18°04′55″N 66°40′05″W
- Commonwealth: Puerto Rico
- Municipality: Ponce

Area
  - Total: 4.21 sq mi (10.9 km^{2})
  - Land: 4.21 sq mi (10.9 km^{2})
  - Water: 0 sq mi (0 km^{2})
- Elevation: 620 ft (190 m)

Population (2010)
  - Total: 1,692
  - Density: 401.9/sq mi (155.2/km^{2})
- Source: 2010 Census
- Time zone: UTC−4 (AST)

Marueño (Barrio Marueño) is one of the 31 barrios of the municipality of Ponce, Puerto Rico. Along with Anón, Coto Laurel, Guaraguao, Quebrada Limón, Real, and San Patricio, and the coastal barrios of Canas and Capitanejo, Marueño is one of the municipality's nine bordering barrios. Marueño borders the municipality of Peñuelas. The name of this barrio is of native Indian origin. It was created in 1831.

== Location ==
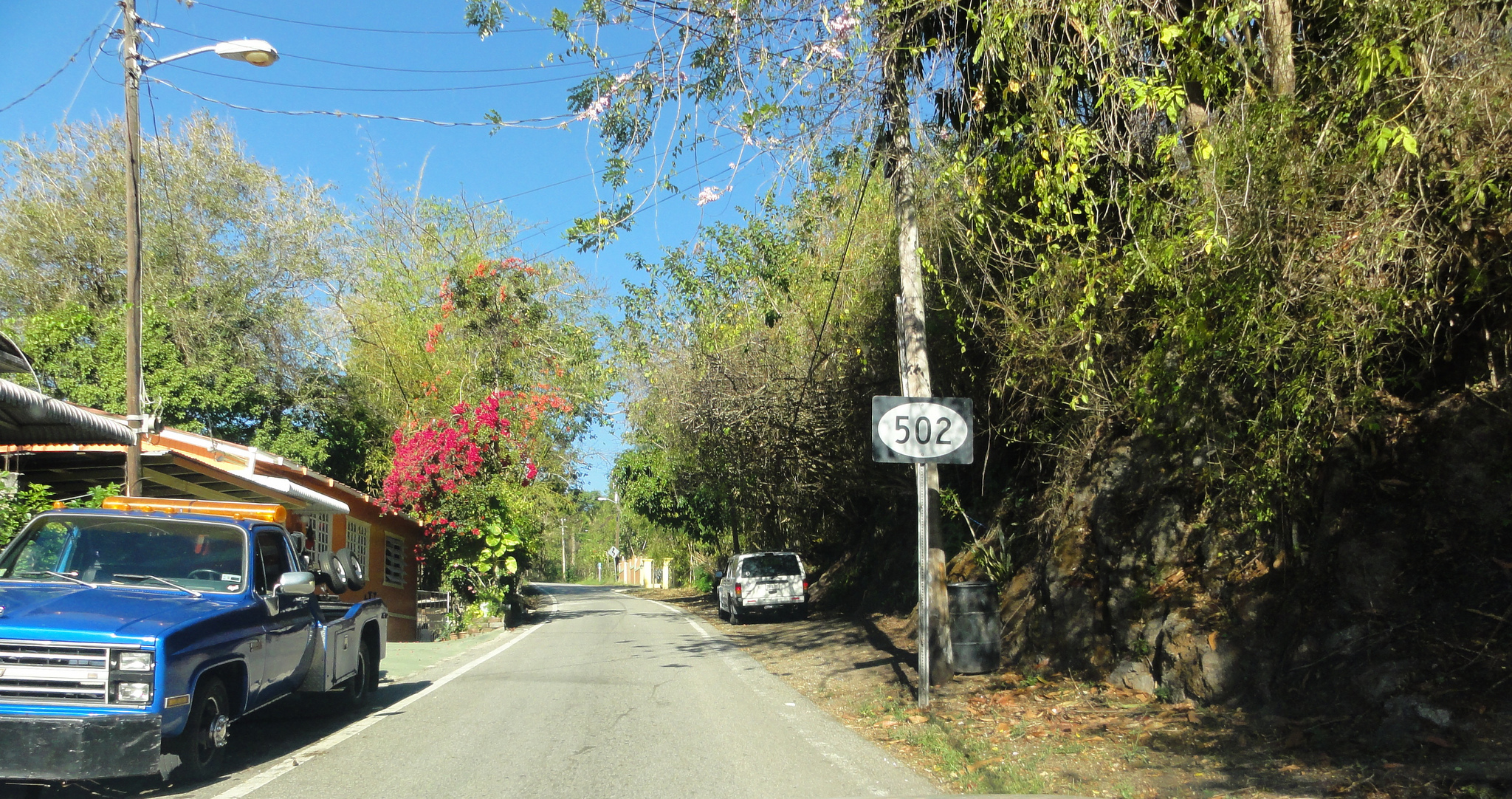
Scene on PR-502 in Barrio Marueño

Marueño is located in the northwestern section of the municipality, northwest of the city of Ponce. It is a mostly mountainous barrio, as it sits on the transition zone between the coastal plains and the rugged mountains of the Cordillera Central. Its highest point is at Monte Marueño (Mount Marueño), which stands at 640 meters (2,100 feet) above sea level. The Pastillo River divides the barrio into two sections of fairly equal size. The river originates high up in the mountains of barrio Guaraguao.

== History ==
=== Origin of the name ===
The name of the barrio has its origins in Europe. Its name is, however, not found in any other part of Puerto Rico. The barrio, the tallest peak in the barrio, and the river that runs through it are all called Marueño.

In the Aragonese language, the name "Marueño" means "a bunch of rocks". The name could also be related to another word of Aragonese origin – "murueño" - meaning “the end of a field”, thus it could then refer to some boundary or refer to the low fence walls used to mark the edge of properties.

== Boundaries ==
Marueño is bounded on the North by PR-801R and by the hills north of PR-501, on the South by Aguamarina Street, and Circulacion Street (18th Street) of Pastillo sector, on the West by the hills half a mile west of PR-501, and on the East by the hills half a mile east of PR-501. In terms of barrio-to-barrio boundaries, Marueño is bounded on the North by barrio Guaraguao, in the South by barrio Quebrada Limón, in the West by the municipality of Peñuelas, and in the East by barrios Magueyes and Guaraguao.

== Features and demographics ==
Marueño has 4.21 square miles (10.9 km^{2}) of land area and 0 square miles (0 km^{2}) of water surface area. In 2000, the population of Marueño was 1,474 persons, and it had a density of 350 persons per square mile.

In 2010, the population of Marueño was 1,692 persons, and it had a density of 401.9 persons per square mile.

Marueño is a rural barrio where the main communal sector is the community of Marueño itself in the southernmost part of the barrio. The main road servicing Barrio Marueño is PR-501, which runs virtually the full length of barrio Marueño from its southern border with barrio Magueyes to close to Marueño's northern border with barrio Guaraguao. PR-501 has two junctions: one connects to PR-502 heading to barrio Quebrada Limón, and the other connects to PR-391 heading to barrio Rucio in the municipality of Peñuelas.

The highest point of barrio Marueño stands at 3,083 feet and is located at the extreme northern end of the barrio.

Historical population
Census	Pop.	Note	%±
1900	1,105		—
1910	998		−9.7%
1920	1,071		7.3%
1930	981		−8.4%
1940	645		−34.3%
1950	712		10.4%
1960	872		22.5%
1970	724		−17.0%
1980	2,086		188.1%
1990	1,778		−14.8%
2000	1,474		−17.1%
2010	1,692		14.8%
U.S. Decennial Census; 1899 (shown as 1900) 1910-1930; 1930-1950 1960 1980-2000 2010

== Landmarks ==
Marueño is home to Río Pastillo, which originates at its northern end and crosses the barrio in its entirety, dividing it in half.

== See also ==
- List of communities in Puerto Rico
