= Guaraguao =

Barrio of Ponce, Puerto Rico

- Barrio
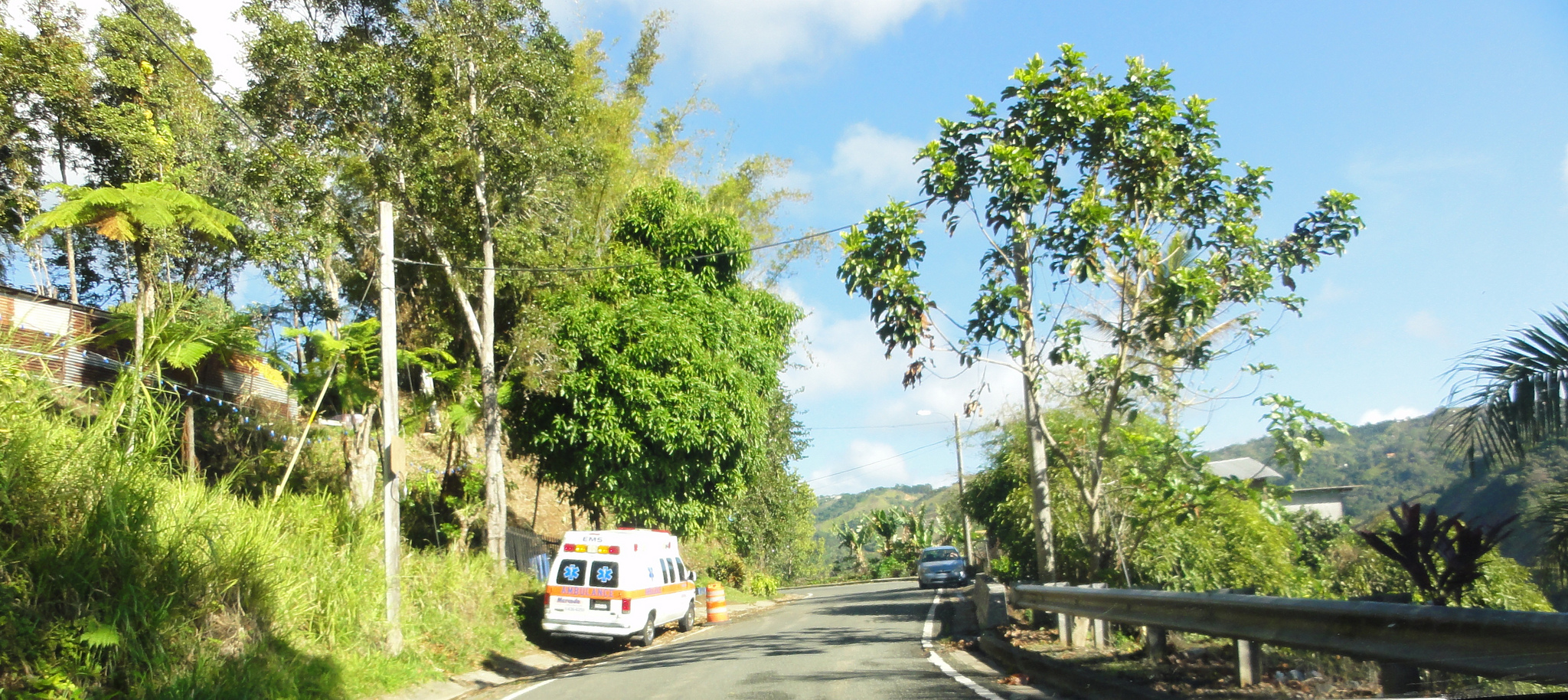
- Scene in Barrio Guaraguao at PR-515 Westbound

- Location of barrio Guaraguao within the municipality of Ponce shown in red

- Location of Puerto Rico
- Coordinates: 18°07′22″N 66°40′16″W
- Commonwealth: Puerto Rico
- Municipality: Ponce

Area
  - Total: 4.13 sq mi (10.7 km^{2})
  - Land: 4.13 sq mi (10.7 km^{2})
  - Water: 0 sq mi (0 km^{2})
- Elevation: 1,765 ft (538 m)

Population (2010)
  - Total: 1,117
  - Density: 270.5/sq mi (104.4/km^{2})
- Source: 2010 Census
- Time zone: UTC−4 (AST)

Guaraguao (Barrio Guaraguao) is one of the 31 barrios in the municipality of Ponce, Puerto Rico. Along with Anón, Coto Laurel, Marueño, Quebrada Limón, Real, and San Patricio, and the coastal barrios of Canas and Capitanejo, Guaraguao is one of the municipality's nine bordering barrios. It borders the municipalities of Adjuntas and Peñuelas. The name of this barrio is of native Taino Indian origin. It was created in 1878. Barrio Guaraguao is one of three Ponce barrios (the others are Barrio Anón and Barrio San Patricio) located on the Cordillera Central mountain range.

== Location ==
Guaraguao is a mountainous rural barrio located in the northwestern section of the municipality, northwest of the city of Ponce. Its location makes it susceptible to heavy rains, landslides, and road closings. The toponymy, or origin of the name, is related to the guaraguao tree, Guarea trichilioides, in the Guarea ramiflora family, a tree that grows to heights between 20 and 70 feet with a maximum 3-foot wide trunk at the foot of mountains in the humid central zone of Puerto Rico.

== Boundaries ==
Guaraguao is bounded on the North by PR-516 (roughly), on the South by the hills north of Tierras Buenas Road, and the hills south of Las Lomas Road, on the West by the hills west of A Street, PR-501 (roughly), and Las Lomas Road (roughly), and on the East by PR-503, Rabanos I Road, PR-10 (roughly), the hills west of PR-123.

In terms of barrio-to-barrio boundaries, Guaraguao is bounded in the North by Barrio San Patricio, and by Barrio Portugues of the municipality of Adjuntas, in the South by Magueyes and Marueño, in the West by Barrio Marueño, and by Barrio Rucio of the municipality of Peñuelas, and in the East by San Patricio and Tibes.

== Features and demographics ==
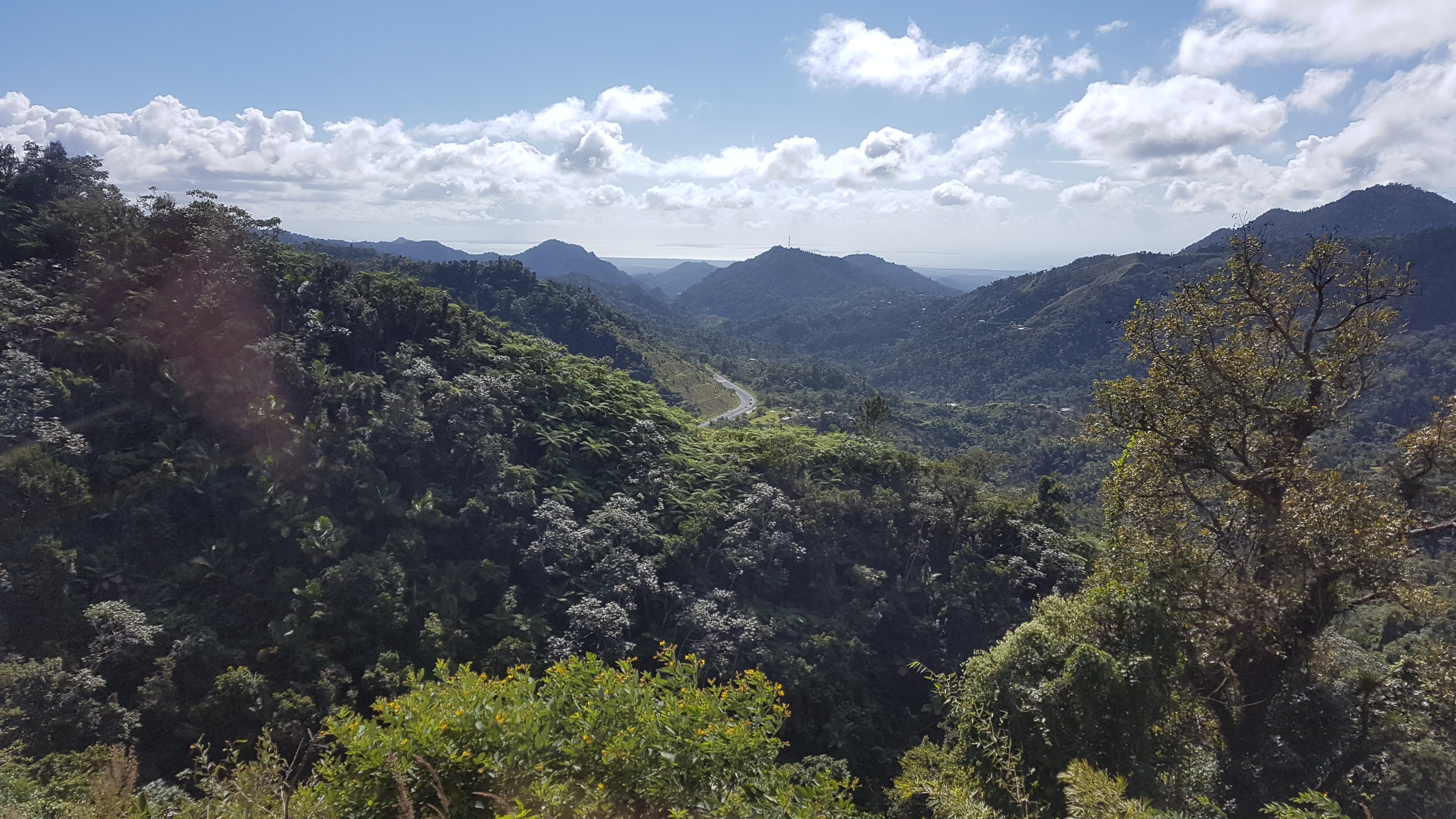
A view of Barrio Guaraguao as seen from PR-143, Ponce; PR-10 can be seen making its ways thru the barrio

Guaraguao has 4.13 square miles (11 km^{2}) of land area and no water area. In 2000, the population of Guaraguao was 1,669 persons, and it had a density of 130 persons per square mile. Guaraguao is the seventh least densely populated barrio in the municipality of Ponce. Major roads serving Barrio Guaraguao are PR-10, PR-123, PR-501, PR-515, and PR-516. The communities of Las Lomas and Santas Pascuas are located in Guaraguao. Also, sector San Andres is in Guaraguao.

In 2010, the population of Guaraguao was 1,117 persons, and it had a density of 270.5 persons per square mile.

The highest point in Barrio Guaraguao stands at 3,280 feet and is located on the extreme northwestern tip of the barrio.

Historical population
Census	Pop.	Note	%±
1900	1,771		—
1910	1,072		−39.5%
1920	1,523		42.1%
1930	1,587		4.2%
1940	1,453		−8.4%
1950	1,499		3.2%
1960	1,520		1.4%
1970	1,396		−8.2%
1980	1,280		−8.3%
1990	1,150		−10.2%
2000	1,017		−11.6%
2010	1,117		9.8%
U.S. Decennial Census; 1899 (shown as 1900) 1910-1930; 1930-1950 1960 1980-2000 2010

== Notable landmarks ==
Guaraguao is abundant in fauna and flora, and it is home to many creeks and brooks. The largest river in barrio Guaraguao is Río Canas, which empties into the Caribbean Sea after merging with Río Pastillo in the city of Ponce to become Rio Matilde. In a March 2010 competition sponsored by the Puerto Rico Water and Environment Association, the Guaraguao water filtering plant of the Puerto Rico Water Authority (Autoridad de Acueductos y Alcantarillados) was assessed to be the best-tasting water in Puerto Rico.

== See also ==
- List of communities in Puerto Rico
