= Quebrada Limón =

Barrio of Ponce, Puerto Rico

- Barrio
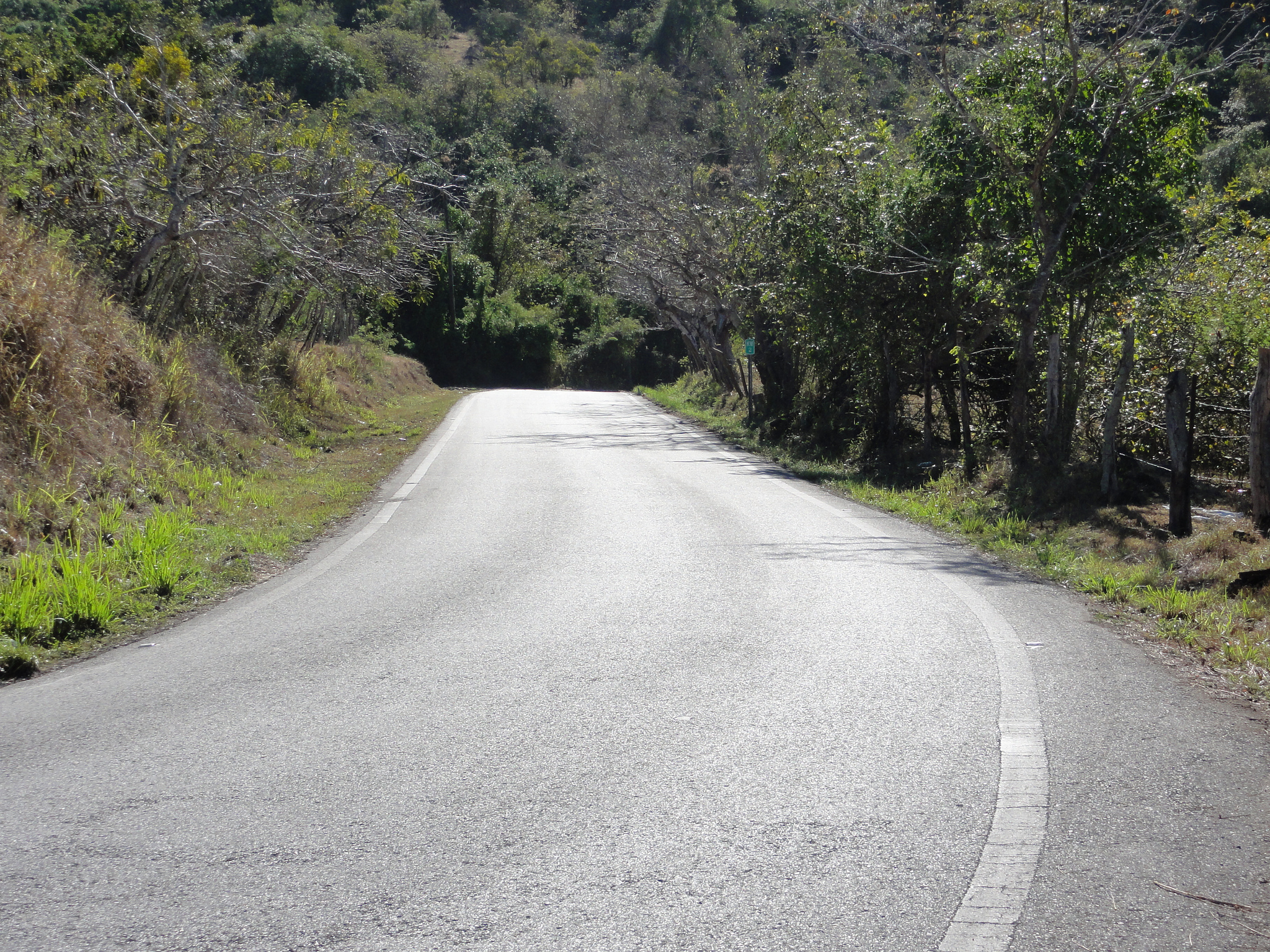
- Scene in Barrio Quebrada Limon at PR-502 near Km 2.0

- Location of barrio Quebrada Limón within the municipality of Ponce shown in red

- Location of Puerto Rico
- Coordinates: 18°03′21″N 66°40′18″W
- Commonwealth: Puerto Rico
- Municipality: Ponce

Area
  - Total: 2.67 sq mi (6.9 km^{2})
  - Land: 2.67 sq mi (6.9 km^{2})
  - Water: 0 sq mi (0 km^{2})
- Elevation: 384 ft (117 m)

Population (2010)
  - Total: 709
  - Density: 265.5/sq mi (102.5/km^{2})
- Source: 2010 Census
- Time zone: UTC−4 (AST)

Quebrada Limón is one of the 31 barrios of the municipality of Ponce, Puerto Rico. Along with Anón, Coto Laurel, Guaraguao, Marueño, Real, and San Patricio, and the coastal barrios of Canas and Capitanejo, Quebrada Limón is one of the municipality's nine bordering barrios. It borders the municipality of Peñuelas. It was founded in 1878.

== Location ==
Quebrada Limón is a rural barrio located in the western section of the municipality, northwest of the center of the city at Plaza Las Delicias, and at latitude 18.054552 N, and longitude -66.671163 W. The toponymy, or origin of the name, alludes to the narrow path between mountains oftentimes producing a stream or creek that runs down a glen.

== Boundaries ==
Quebrada Limón is bounded on the North by the hills south of El Pecho Road and the hills north of Marungueyes Road, on the South by the hills north of Bello Road, and Clavel Street, on the West by hills east of PR-520, and on the East by the hills west of PR-502.

In terms of barrio-to-barrio boundaries, Quebrada Limón is bounded in the North by Marueño, in the South by Canas, in the West by barrios Tallaboa Alta and Rucio of the municipality of Peñuelas, and in the East by Marueño and Canas.

== Features and demographics ==
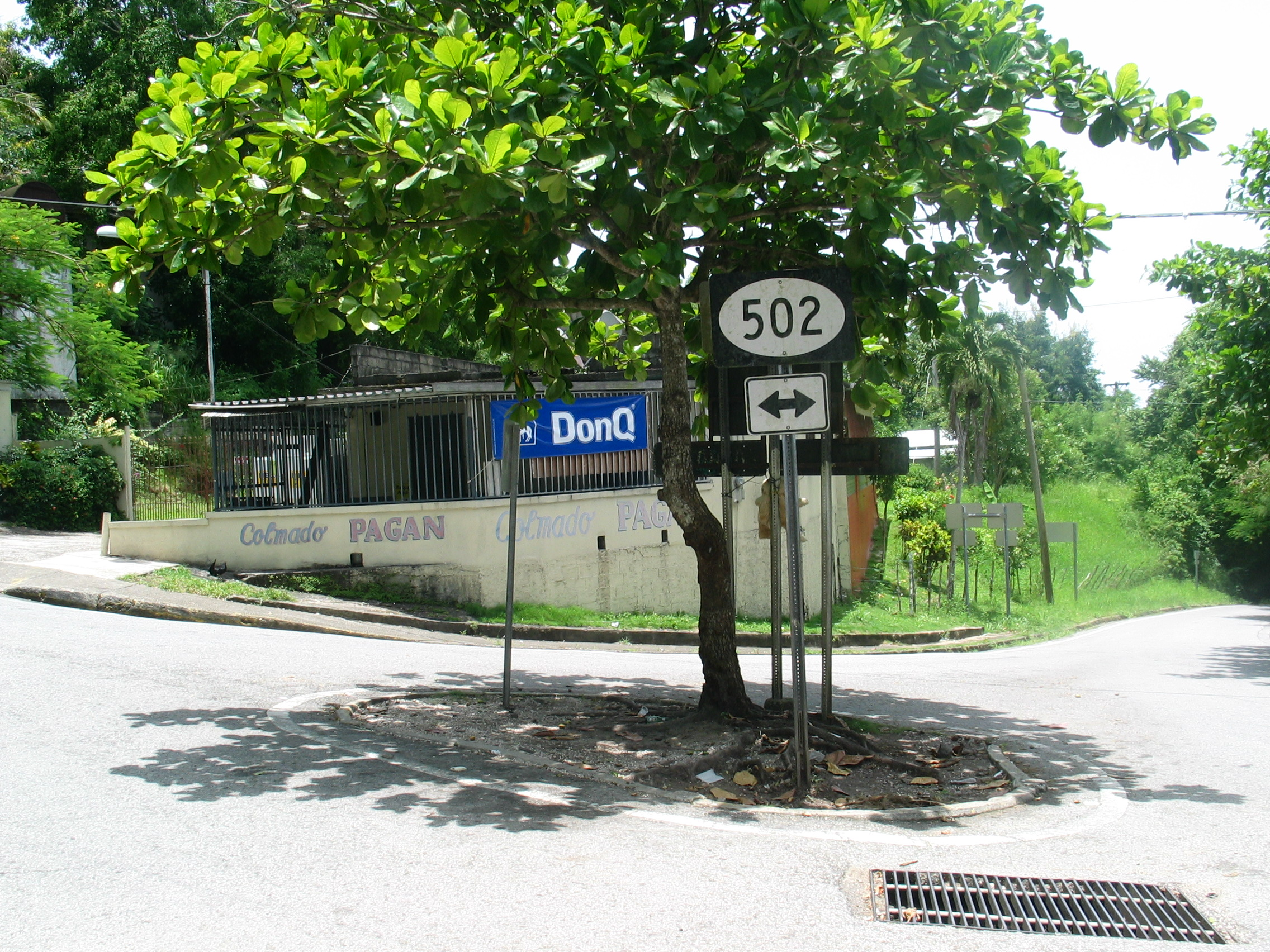
PR-502 traveling southbound in Barrio Quebrada Limon, Ponce, PR

Quebrada Limón is home to the communities of Pastillo Canas and Hacienda Josefa. Pastillo Canas is located in the southern section of the barrio, near barrio Canas' Pastillo community. The rest of Quebrada Limón is strictly rural.

Quebrada Limón has 2.67 square miles (6.9 km^{2}) of land area and no water area. In 2000, the population of Quebrada Limón was 804 persons, and it had a density of 301 persons per square mile.

In 2010, the population of Quebrada Limón was 709 persons, and it had a density of 265.5 persons per square mile.

The main road serving barrio Quebrada Limon is PR-502.

The highest point in barrio Quebrada Limón stands at 984 feet over sea level and is located at the extreme northern end of the barrio.

Historical population
Census	Pop.	Note	%±
1900	547		—
1910	703		28.5%
1920	643		−8.5%
1930	569		−11.5%
1940	549		−3.5%
1950	521		−5.1%
1960	681		30.7%
1970	667		−2.1%
1980	856		28.3%
1990	830		−3.0%
2000	804		−3.1%
2010	709		−11.8%
U.S. Decennial Census; 1899 (shown as 1900) 1910-1930; 1930-1950 1960 1980-2000 2010

== Notable Landmarks ==
Several streams make their way through this rural barrio, including the brook from which the barrio draws its name: Quebrada Limón (English: Limón Brook). A section of Rio Pastillo also winds its way through the barrio. In fact, Limon Brook feeds into Río Pastillo.

== See also ==
- List of communities in Puerto Rico
