= Canas, Ponce, Puerto Rico =

Barrio of Puerto Rico

Canas
- Barrio
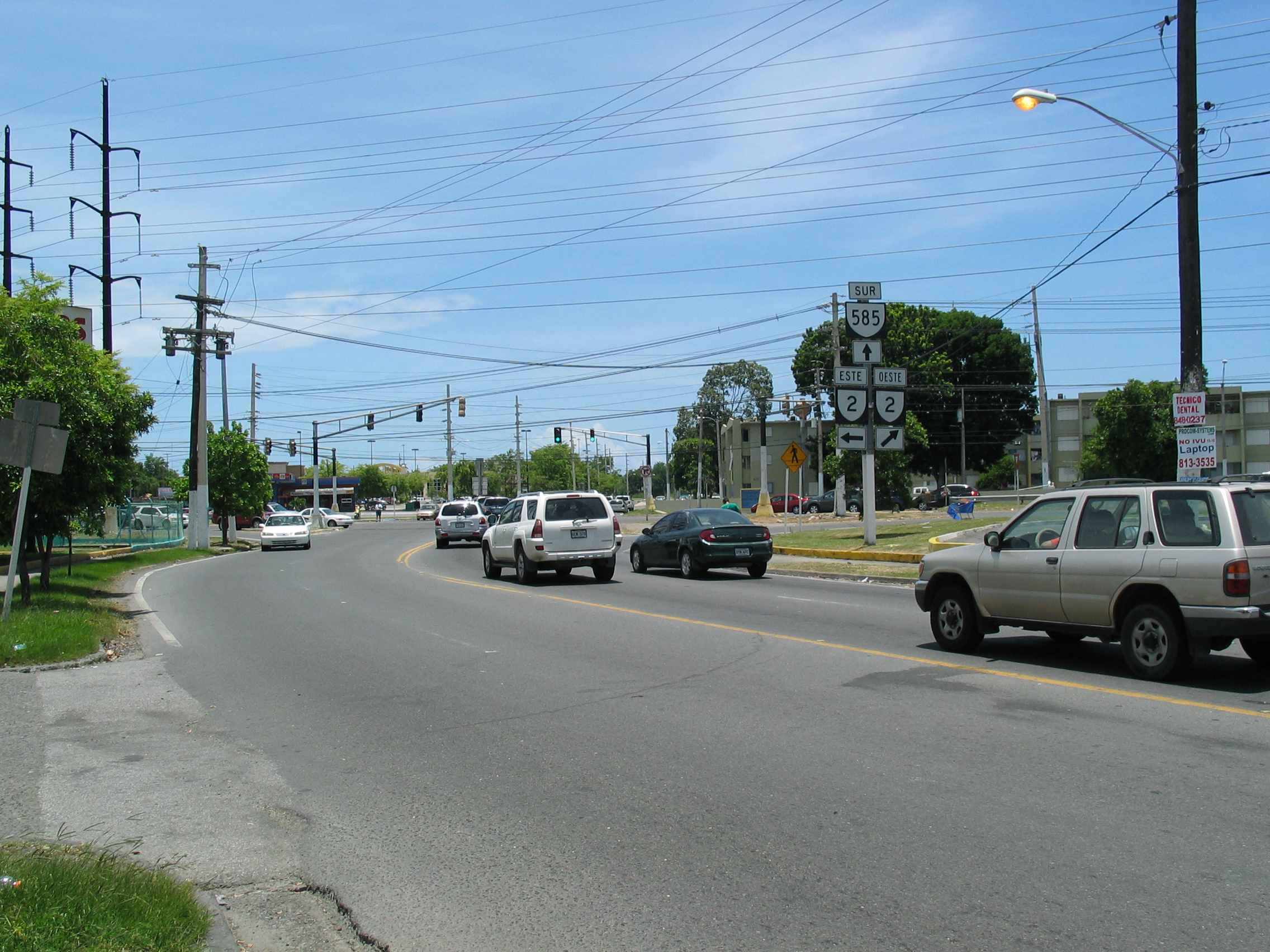
- Scene in Barrio Canas at PR-585 and PR-2

- Location of barrio Canas within the municipality of Ponce shown in red

- Location of Puerto Rico
- Coordinates: 17°59′22″N 66°40′10″W
- Commonwealth: Puerto Rico
- Municipality: Ponce

Area
  - Total: 22.82 sq mi (59.1 km^{2})
  - Land: 14.47 sq mi (37.5 km^{2})
  - Water: 8.35 sq mi (21.6 km^{2})
- Elevation: 217 ft (66 m)

Population (2010)
  - Total: 32,708
  - Density: 2,260.4/sq mi (872.7/km^{2})
- Source: 2010 Census
- Time zone: UTC−4 (AST)

Canas is one of the 31 barrios in the municipality of Ponce, Puerto Rico. Along with Anón, Coto Laurel, Guaraguao, Quebrada Limón, Real, San Patricio, and Marueño, and the coastal barrio of Capitanejo, Canas is one of the municipality's nine bordering barrios. It borders the municipality of Peñuelas. Along with Playa, Bucana, Vayas and Capitanejo, Canas is also one of Ponce's five coastal barrios. It was founded in 1831. (Note: Eduardo Questell Rodriguez ("Historia de la Comunidad Bélgica de Ponce: A partir de la Hacienda Muñiz y otros datos"; Ponce: PR: Mariana Editores; 2018; ISBN 978-1-935892-04-5; p.13) points out that in 1828 Pedro Tomas de Cordoba ("Memorias geográficas, históricas, y estadísticas de la Isla de Puerto Rico" Instituto de Cultura Puertorriquña. San Juan, PR. 1968. Tomo II, citado por Socorro Girón en "Ponce, el teatro La Perla y La Campana de la Almudaina". Ponce: Gobierno Municipal de Ponce. 1992, pp 10-11) listed the then-21 barrios of Ponce and his 1828 21-barrio list already included Barrio Canas, so it appears that Barrio Canas was founded in 1828, and it is even possible it may have actually been founded much earlier than 1828.)

== Location ==
Canas is a suburban and partly mountainous barrio located in the southern section of the municipality, west of the city of Ponce, at latitude 18.000283N, and longitude -66.658800 W.

== Name ==
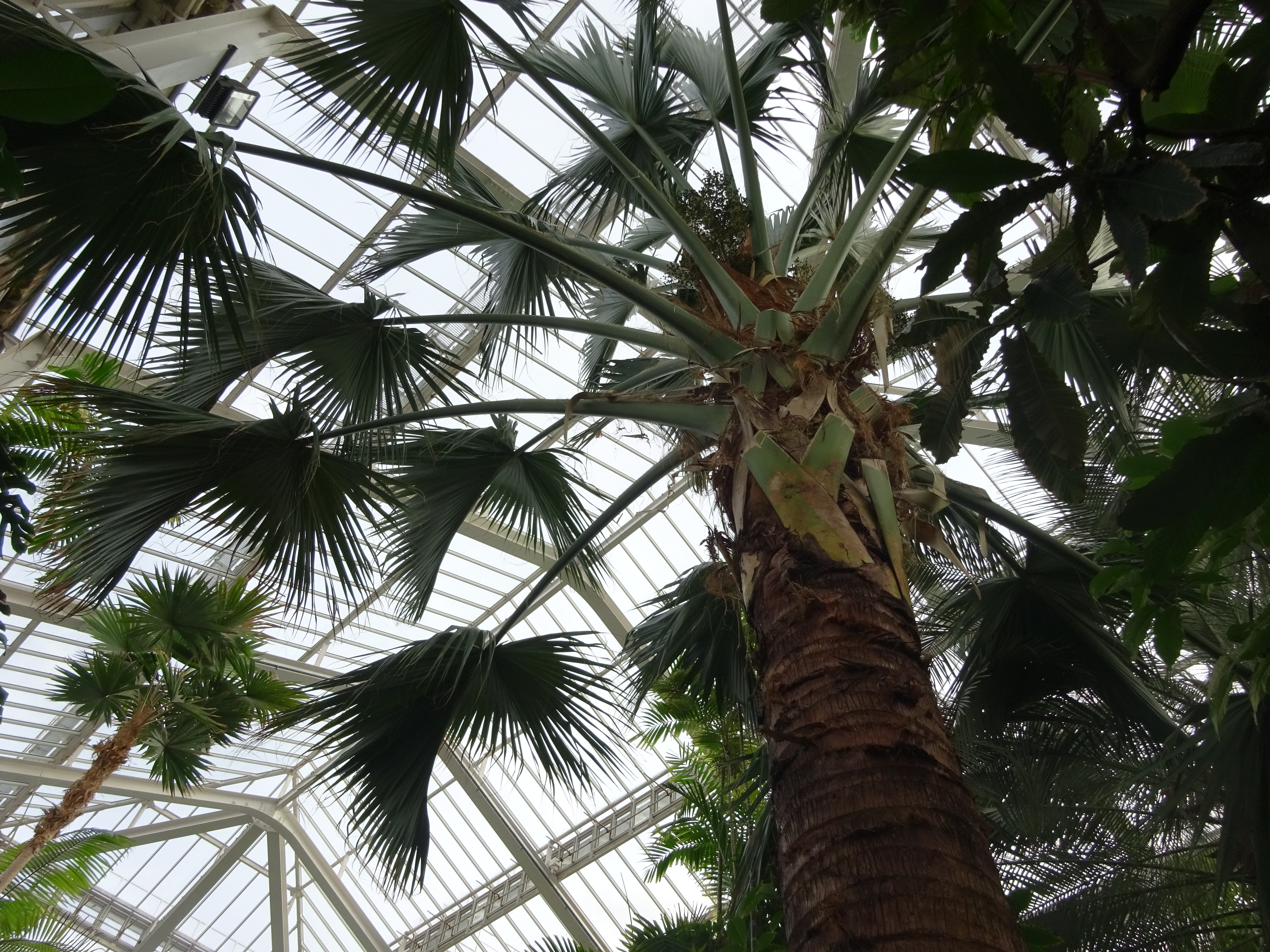
Palma Cana (Sabal domingensis), palm after which Barrio Canas in Ponce is said to have been named.

According to Sunny A. Cabrera Salcedo in this Ph.D. dissertation, the name is of native American origin. However, according to famed Puerto Rican historian Eduardo Neumann Gandia, the name Canas comes from Palma Cana, a palm useful for making sombreros, which was very abundant in the territory of Barrio Canas. Ivette Perez Vega de Soler states that Canas, more than any other barrio in Ponce, had extensive areas of "palmares de yaguas". The barrio formed from a community of tobacco plant growers dating back to the 1680s.

== Boundaries ==
It is bounded on the North by the hills north of Camino Bello Road, the hills north of PR-132, and Clavel Street, on the South by the Caribbean Sea, on the West by the El Peñón de Ponce promontory, the hills west of Correccional Las Cucharas Street, and the hills west of PR-549, and on the East by the hills west of PR-123, the future western branch of PR-9, Río Pastillo (roughly) and Río Matilde (roughly).

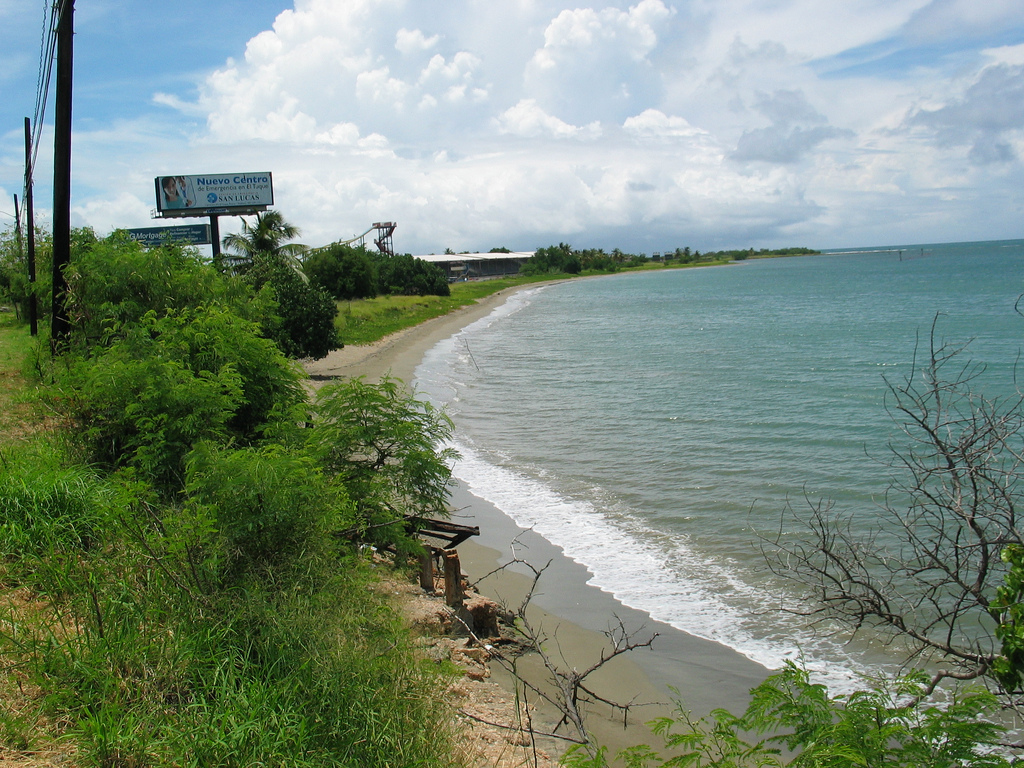
El Tuque Beach as seen from Puerto Rico Highway 2 (PR-2) in Barrio Canas

In terms of barrio-to-barrio boundaries, Canas is bounded in the North by the Quebrada Limón and Portugués, in the South by the Caribbean Sea, in the West by the barrios of Encarnacion, Tallaboa Saliente, and Tallaboa Alta of the municipality of Peñuelas, and in the East by Magueyes, Magueyes Urbano, Canas Urbano, and Playa.

== Features and demographics ==
Canas is divided into three subbarrios according to the U.S. Census Bureau: Baldorioty de Castro, Clausells, and Reparada. The northern portion of Canas is home to the communities of Quebrada del Agua, Mansiones del Sur, Pastillo Alto, Villa Paraiso, Jardines del Caribe, Villa Delicias, Casa Mia, Villas del Caribe, Valle Alegre, and Quintas del Sur, while the southern section is host to La Cotorra, Baramaya, Bello Horizonte, Las Margaritas, La Matilde, Punto Oro, Punta Diamante, El Tuque, Nueva Vida, Las Batatas, Brisas del Caribe, and Las Cucharas.

Canas has 14.5 square miles (38 km^{2}) of land area and 8.3 square miles (21 km^{2}) of water area. In 2000, the population of Canas was 34,065 persons, and it had a density of 2,349 persons per square mile. Canas, has the distinction of being the most populated barrio in the municipality of Ponce. It also has the longest coastline of all barrios in Ponce.

In 2010, the population of Canas was 32,708 persons, and it had a density of 2,260.4 persons per square mile.

Major roads in barrio Canas are PR-2, PR-132, PR-500, and PR-549.

The highest point in Barrio Canas stands at 918 feet and is located at the northernmost tip of the barrio. Another notable land feature is the Penon de Ponce promontory near the shoreline which stands at 331 feet.

Historical population
Census	Pop.	Note	%±
1900	2,680		—
1910	2,935		9.5%
1920	2,808		−4.3%
1930	4,322		53.9%
1940	9,188		112.6%
1950	1,208		−86.9%
1960	3,005		148.8%
1970	5,381		79.1%
1980	21,900		307.0%
1990	29,146		33.1%
2000	34,065		16.9%
2010	32,708		−4.0%
U.S. Decennial Census; 1899 (shown as 1900) 1910-1930; 1930-1950 1960 1980-2000 2010

== Notable landmarks ==
Barrio Canas is home to Salinas Lagoon, a natural reserve. El Tuque Beach is also located in Barrio Canas.

The Francisco Parra Duperón school is located in this barrio.

== See also ==
- List of communities in Puerto Rico
