= Sabanetas, Ponce, Puerto Rico =

Barrio of Puerto Rico

Sabanetas
- Barrio
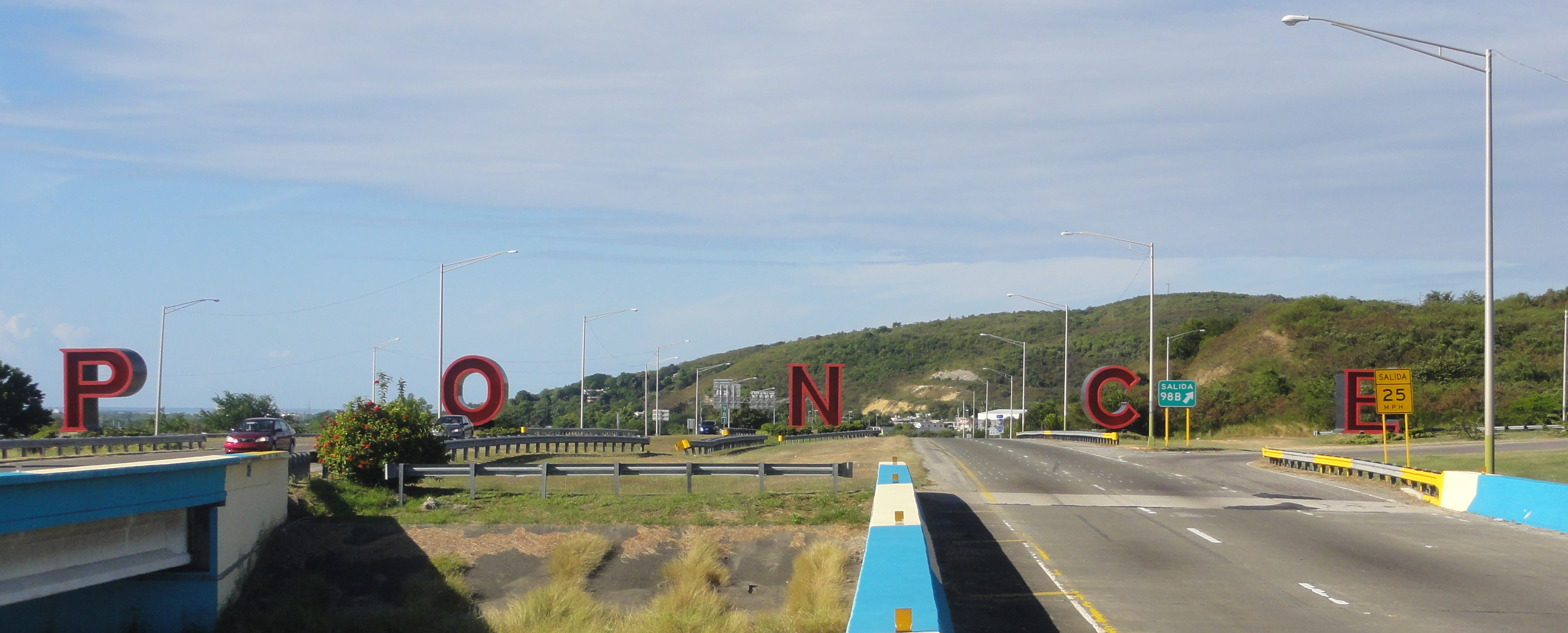
- The iconic Letras de Ponce in barrio Sabanetas

- Location of Barrio Sabanetas within the municipality of Ponce shown in red

- Location of Puerto Rico
- Coordinates: 18°01′08″N 66°34′52″W
- Commonwealth: Puerto Rico
- Municipality: Ponce

Area
  - Total: 2.79 sq mi (7.2 km^{2})
  - Land: 2.74 sq mi (7.1 km^{2})
  - Water: 0.05 sq mi (0.13 km^{2})
- Elevation: 121 ft (37 m)

Population (2010)
  - Total: 5,534
  - Density: 2,034.6/sq mi (785.6/km^{2})
- Source: 2010 Census
- Time zone: UTC−4 (AST)

Sabanetas (Barrio Sabanetas) is one of the 31 barrios of the municipality of Ponce, Puerto Rico. Along with Magueyes, Tibes, Portugués, Montes Llanos, Machuelo Arriba, Maragüez, and Cerrillos, Sabanetas is one of the municipality's eight rural interior barrios. The name of this barrio is of native Indian origin. It was founded in 1831.

== Location ==
Sabanetas is located in the southern section of the municipality, east of the traditional city center at Plaza Las Delicias. The toponymy, or origin of the name, is one that describes an open valley covered by grasslands and few, if any, trees.

== Boundaries ==
It is bounded on the North by barrio Cerrillos, in the South by barrios Bucaná and Vayas, in the West by barrios Machuelo Abajo and San Anton, and in the East by barrios Coto Laurel and Vayas.

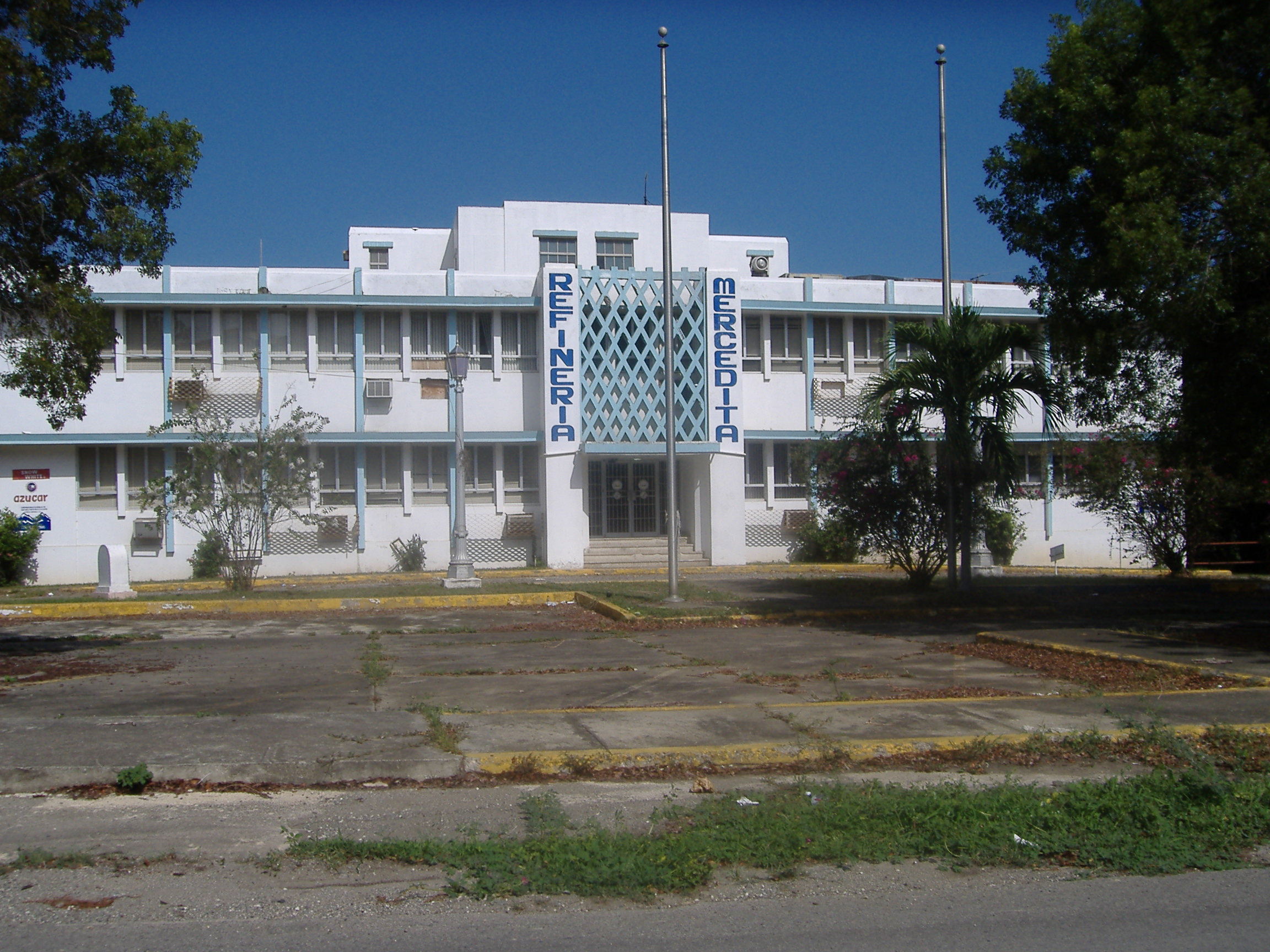
The historic Central Mercedita, in Barrio Sabanetas

== Features and demographics ==
Sabanetas has 2.7 square miles (7.0 km^{2}) of land area and 0.1 square miles (260,000 m^{2}) of water area. In 2000, the population of Sabanetas was 6,420. The population density in Sabanetas was 2,352 persons per square mile.

In 2010, the population of Sabanetas was 5,534 persons, and it had a density of 2,034.6 persons per square mile.

The communities of Campo Alegre, Alta Vista, Villa Flores, and Sabanetas proper are located in barrio Sabanetas.

Major roads serving Barrio Sabanetas are PR-1, PR-52, and PR-10.

The highest point in Barrio Sabanetas is Cerro Los Negrones which stands at 397 feet.

Historical population
Census	Pop.	Note	%±
1900	1,065		—
1910	1,197		12.4%
1920	1,346		12.4%
1930	1,834		36.3%
1940	2,068		12.8%
1950	1,922		−7.1%
1960	2,644		37.6%
1970	7,558		185.9%
1980	7,655		1.3%
1990	6,968		−9.0%
2000	6,420		−7.9%
2010	5,534		−13.8%
U.S. Decennial Census; 1899 (shown as 1900) 1910-1930; 1930-1950 1960 1980-2000 2010

== Landmarks ==
The Sabanetas Industrial Park is located in Sabanetas, as is Central Mercedita.

== See also ==
- List of communities in Puerto Rico
