= Tibes =

Barrio of Ponce, Puerto Rico

- Barrio
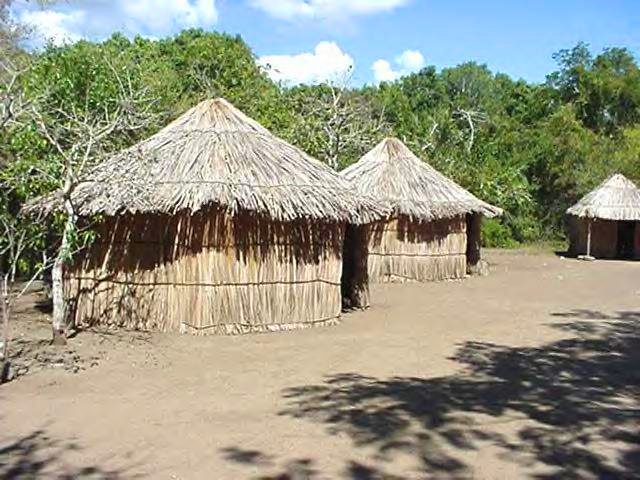
- Tibes is home to the Tibes Indigenous Ceremonial Center

- Location of barrio Tibes within the municipality of Ponce shown in red

- Location of Puerto Rico
- Coordinates: 18°05′12″N 66°38′04″W
- Commonwealth: Puerto Rico
- Municipality: Ponce

Area
  - Total: 6.99 sq mi (18.1 km^{2})
  - Land: 6.99 sq mi (18.1 km^{2})
  - Water: 0 sq mi (0 km^{2})
- Elevation: 1,099 ft (335 m)

Population (2010)
  - Total: 804
  - Density: 115/sq mi (44/km^{2})
- Source: 2010 Census
- Time zone: UTC−4 (AST)

Tibes (Barrio Tibes) is one of the 31 barrios in the municipality of Ponce, Puerto Rico. Together with Magueyes, Portugués, Montes Llanos, Maragüez, Machuelo Arriba, Sabanetas, and Cerrillos, barrio Tibes is one of the municipality's eight rural interior barrios. Tibes attracted attention recently when, in 1975, what was to become the discovery of the oldest cemetery in the West Indies came about as a result of rainstorms. The name of this barrio is of native Indian origin. It was organized in 1831.

== Location ==
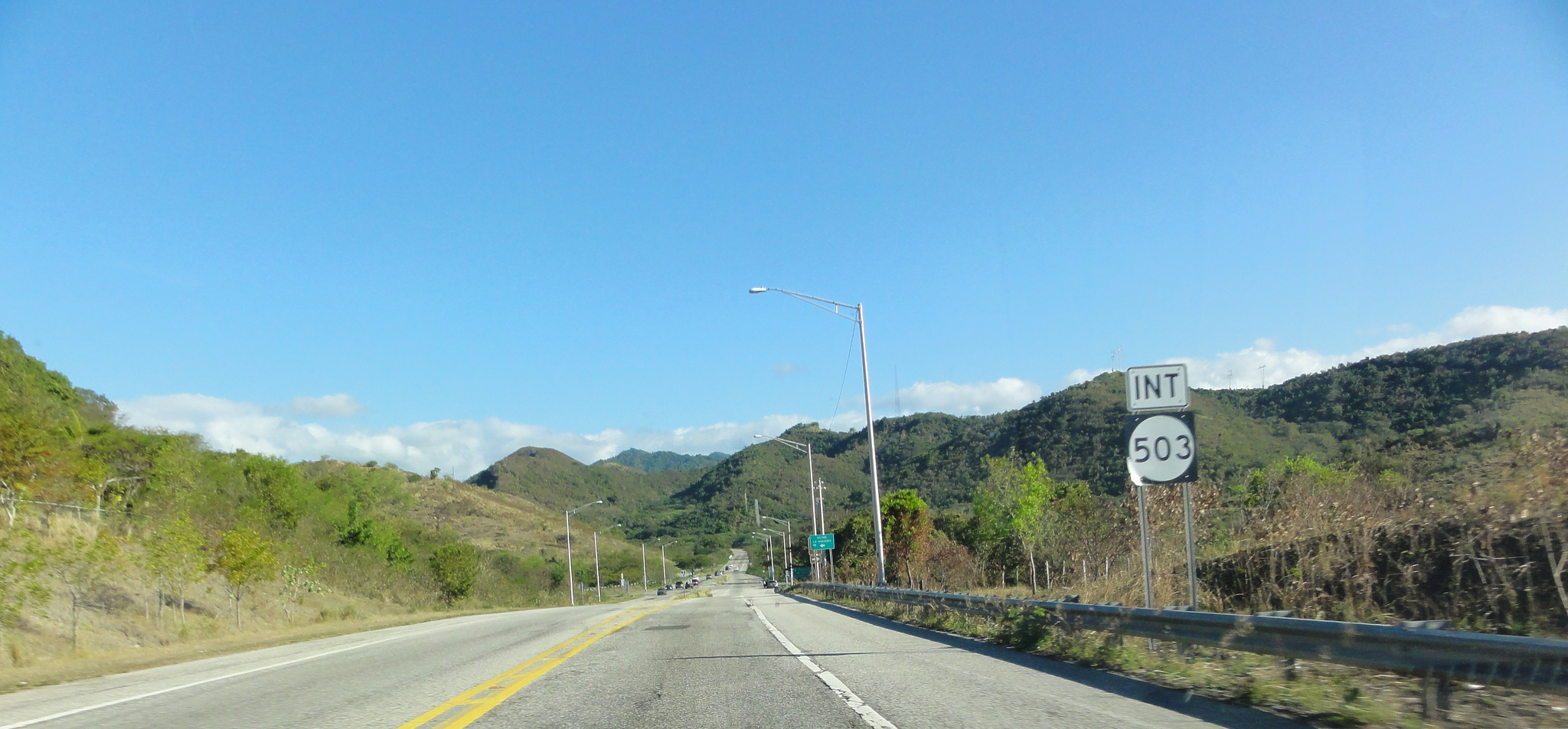
Landscape scene in Barrio Tibes at PR-10 northbound approaching PR-503

Tibes is a mountainous rural barrio located in the central section of the municipality, north of the city of Ponce. Tibes is located on the foothills of the Cordillera Central. The toponymy, or origin of the name, is related to the hard, smooth stones plentiful in the rivers of this barrio and used by the indigenous peoples of the area as a weapon and the jíbaro countrymen for sharpening agricultural tools such as the machete. Hurricane Maria hit Puerto Rico on September 20, 2017 causing catastrophic damages. Some residents of Tibes were cut off for 3 months, unable to find passage from their homes due to blocked roadways.

== Boundaries ==
Tibes is bounded on the North by the hills just north of El Principe Road, on the South by Tibes Road, on the West by the hills west of PR-10, and on the East by Pastillo Road, the hills west of Río Chiquito.

In terms of barrio-to-barrio boundaries, Tibes is bounded in the North by Barrio San Patricio, in the South by Portugués, in the West by Guaraguao and Magueyes, and in the East by Barrios Monte Llano and Portugués.

== Features and demographics ==
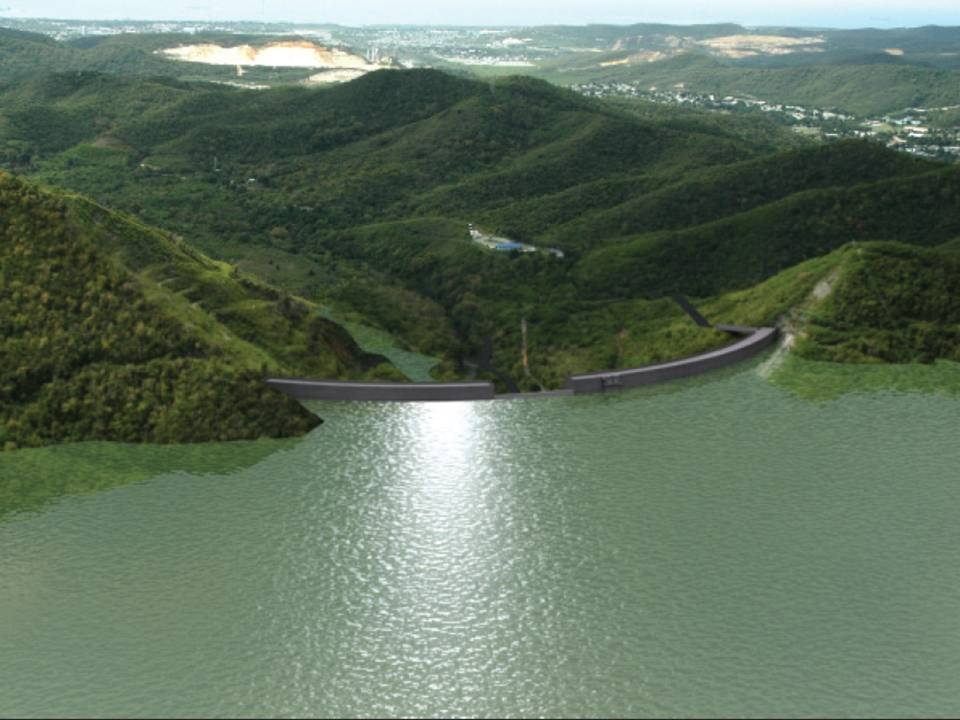
Artistic rendering of Portugues Dam in Barrio Tibes

In 2000, Tibes had 7.01 square miles (18 km^{2}) of land area and no water area. In 2000, the population of Tibes was 866 persons, and it had a density of 124 inhabitants per square mile. Tibes is the second least populated barrio in Ponce, after San Patricio. Major roads serving Barrio Tibes are PR-10 and PR-503.

In 2010, Tibes had 6.99 square miles (18 km^{2}) of land area and no water area. In 2010, the population of Tibes was 804 persons, and it had a density of 115 persons per square mile.

The highest point in Barrio Tibes is Cerro del Diablo which stands at 2,234 feet. Another notable land feature is Cerro La Mesa which stands at 1,742 feet. Río Portugués is the main body of water running through this barrio.

Historical population
Census	Pop.	Note	%±
1900	1,878		—
1910	1,650		−12.1%
1920	1,957		18.6%
1930	1,612		−17.6%
1940	1,933		19.9%
1950	1,644		−15.0%
1960	1,536		−6.6%
1970	1,475		−4.0%
1980	1,437		−2.6%
1990	888		−38.2%
2000	866		−2.5%
2010	804		−7.2%
U.S. Decennial Census; 1899 (shown as 1900) 1910-1930; 1930-1950 1960 1980-2000 2010

== Portugues Dam ==
The Portugués Dam is also located in Barrio Tibes.

== See also ==
- List of communities in Puerto Rico
