= Puerto Rico Highway 503 =

Highway in Puerto Rico

Highway 503
- Ruta 503
- Carretera David Medina Feliciano
- Map of Puerto Rico road PR-503 within the Municipality of Ponce in relation to the other major roads in the municipality

Route information
- Maintained by Puerto Rico DTPW
- Length: 17.0 km (10.6 mi)

Southern segment
- South end: Calle Salsa in Sexto
- Major intersections: PR-10 / PR-504 in Portugués; PR-10 in Tibes
- North end: Portugués Dam in Tibes

Northern segment
- South end: PR-10 in Tibes
- Major intersections: PR-505 in San Patricio
- North end: PR-143 in Consejo

Location
- Country: United States
- Territory: Puerto Rico
- Municipalities: Ponce, Adjuntas, Utuado

Highway system
- Roads in Puerto Rico; List
← PR-502	→ PR-504

Puerto Rico Highway 503 (PR-503), also called Carretera Tibes (Road to Tibes), is a tertiary state road that connects Barrio Consejo, in the southwestern part of the municipality of Utuado, to Barrio Tercero in the city of Ponce, and ending at Museo de la Historia de Ponce, one block east of the center of the city at Plaza Las Delicias.

== Route description ==
The road's northern terminus is at its intersection with Puerto Rico Highway 143 in Utuado's barrio Consejo, about 1/4 mile north of Utuado's borderline with the municipality of Adjuntas. The road runs in a southerly fashion from its northern terminus at Barrio Consejo, Utuado, through barrio Portugués of the municipality of Adjuntas, and then enters the municipality of Ponce, running through barrios Guaraguao, San Patricio, and Tibes. Starting in 2008, the flow of this road through Barrio Tibes was interrupted by the construction of the Rio Portugués river dam. As a result, there is now a permanent 3-mile stretch of this road that no longer exists. The road picks up again at the southern end of the Rio Portugues river dam, continuing in its southerly run through the rest of barrio Tibes and then through barrios Portugués Rural, and Portugués Urbano of the municipality of Ponce, before reaching barrio Sexto (Cantera) in the city of Ponce. The road then follows the course of Calle Mayor Cantera street in Ponce until it comes to its southern terminus at Calle Mayor street's intersection with Calle Isabel, (Calle Isabel is signed as PR-1).

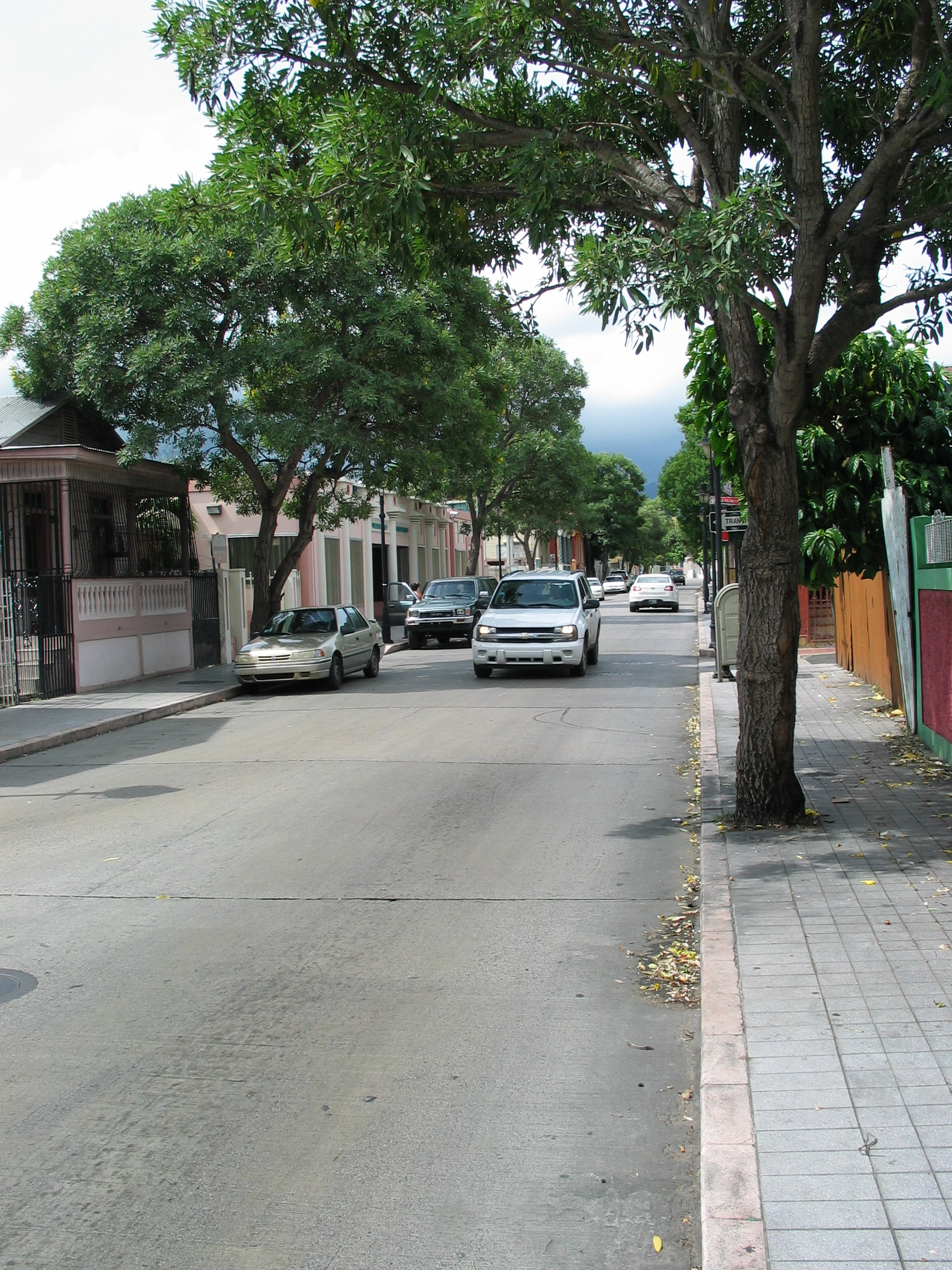
Calle Mayor Cantera, part of PR-503 and near its southern terminus, in Ponce

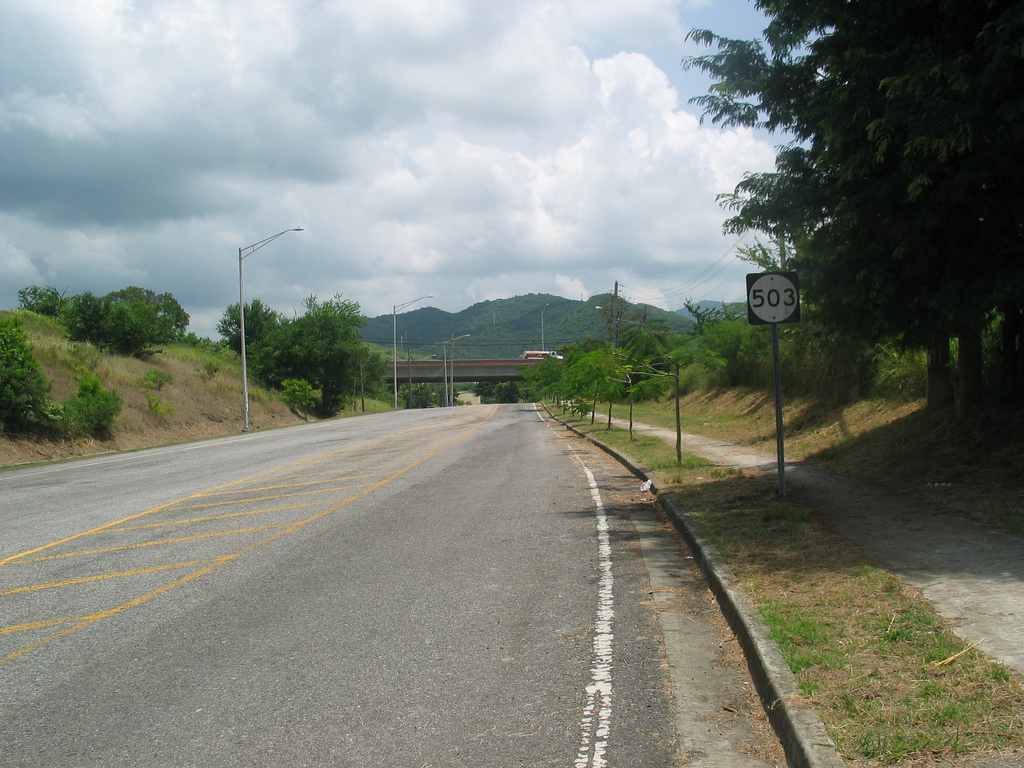
A stretch of Puerto Rico Highway 503 (PR-503) heading northbound in Barrio Portugués Rural, in Ponce, Puerto Rico

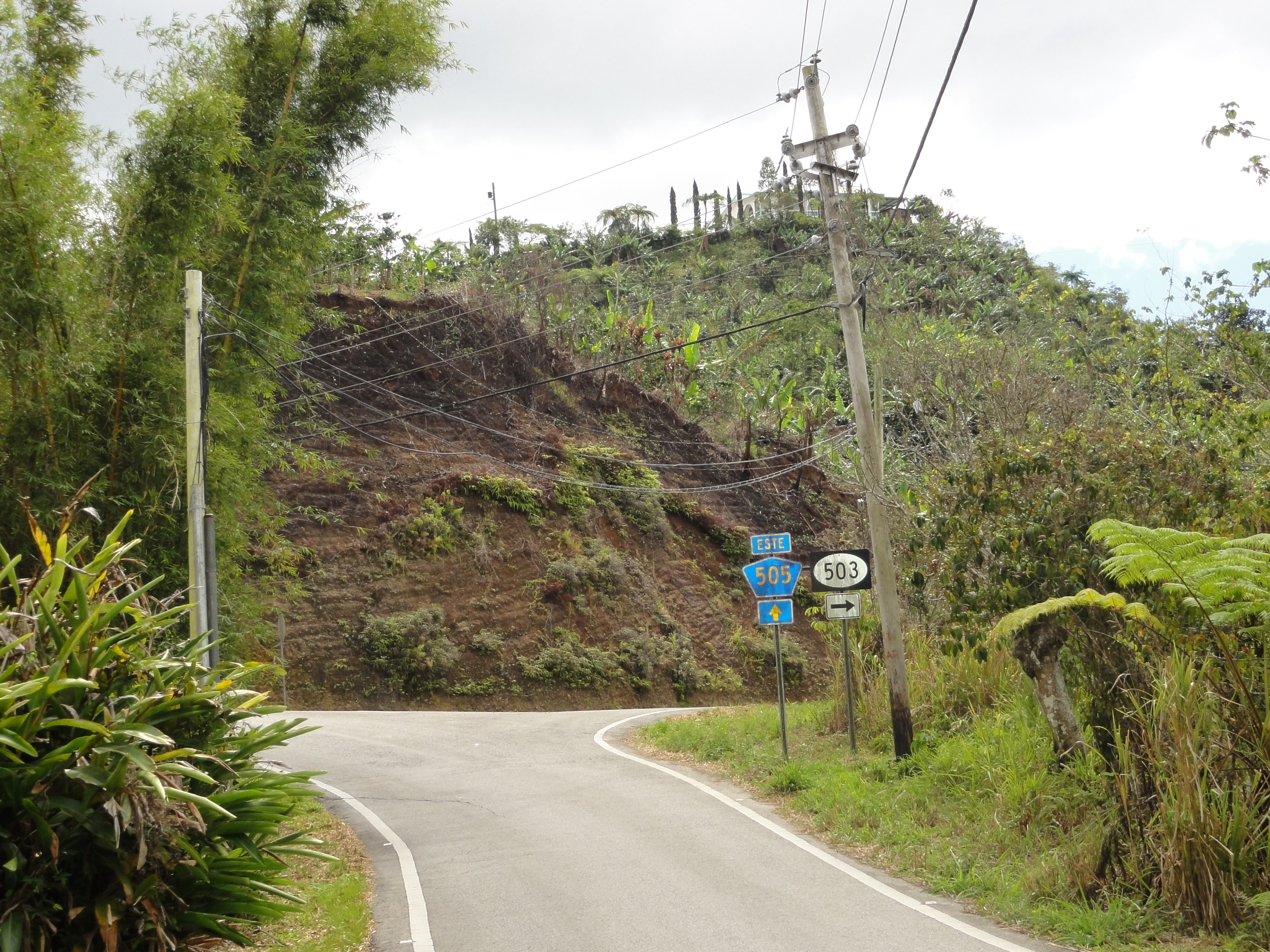
PR-503 southbound where PR-505 has its northern terminus, in Barrio San Patricio

=== Portugués dam ===
PR-503 used to be a single stretch country road from Ponce to Utuado until the late 2000s when construction of the Portugués Dam changed that. In the mid 2010s a segment of this roadway was obliterated by the construction of the Portugués River reservoir, which now sits between the northern section of the road and the southern segment, disrupting the continuity of the road, but providing two approaches to the Dam and access to it from both the north and the south.

=== Road renamed ===
On 12 July 2011, Governor Luis Fortuño signed Law #130-2011 (House Bill 2885) naming this road as the David Medina-Feliciano Highway in honor of the costumbrista painter from Ponce.

== History ==
Prior to its numerical designation, PR-503 was only known as Carretera Tibes. The current numerical designation corresponds to the 1953 Puerto Rico highway renumbering, a process implemented by the Puerto Rico Department of Transportation and Public Works (Spanish: Departamento de Transportación y Obras Públicas) that increased the insular highway network to connect existing routes with different locations around Puerto Rico.

== Major intersections ==
Municipality	Location	km	mi	Destinations	Notes
Ponce	Sexto	0.0	0.0	PR-Calle Salsa – Ponce	Southern terminus of PR-503
Ponce	Portugués	1.4– 1.7	0.87– 1.1	PR-10 (Carretera Salvador "Chiry" Vassallo Ruiz) / PR-504 – Adjuntas, Juana Díaz, Machuelo Arriba	Partial cloverleaf interchange
Ponce	Tibes	3.4	2.1	PR-10 (Carretera Salvador "Chiry" Vassallo Ruiz) – Ponce, Adjuntas	
Ponce	Tibes	5.5	3.4	[[Puerto Rico Highway Portugués Dam |PR-Portugués Dam]] – Tibes	Northern terminus of southern segment; dead end road
Ponce	Tibes	Gap in route			
Ponce	Tibes	0.0	0.0	PR-10 (Carretera Salvador "Chiry" Vassallo Ruiz) – Ponce, Adjuntas	Southern terminus of northern segment
Ponce	San Patricio	7.3	4.5	PR-505 south (Carretera La Guardarraya) – Ponce	
Adjuntas	No major junctions				
Utuado	Consejo	11.5	7.1	PR-143 (Ruta Panorámica) – Adjuntas, Barranquitas	Northern terminus of PR-503
1.000 mi = 1.609 km; 1.000 km = 0.621 mi

== See also ==
- List of highways in Ponce, Puerto Rico
- List of streets in Ponce, Puerto Rico
