= Chiquito River (Ponce, Puerto Rico) =

River of Puerto Rico

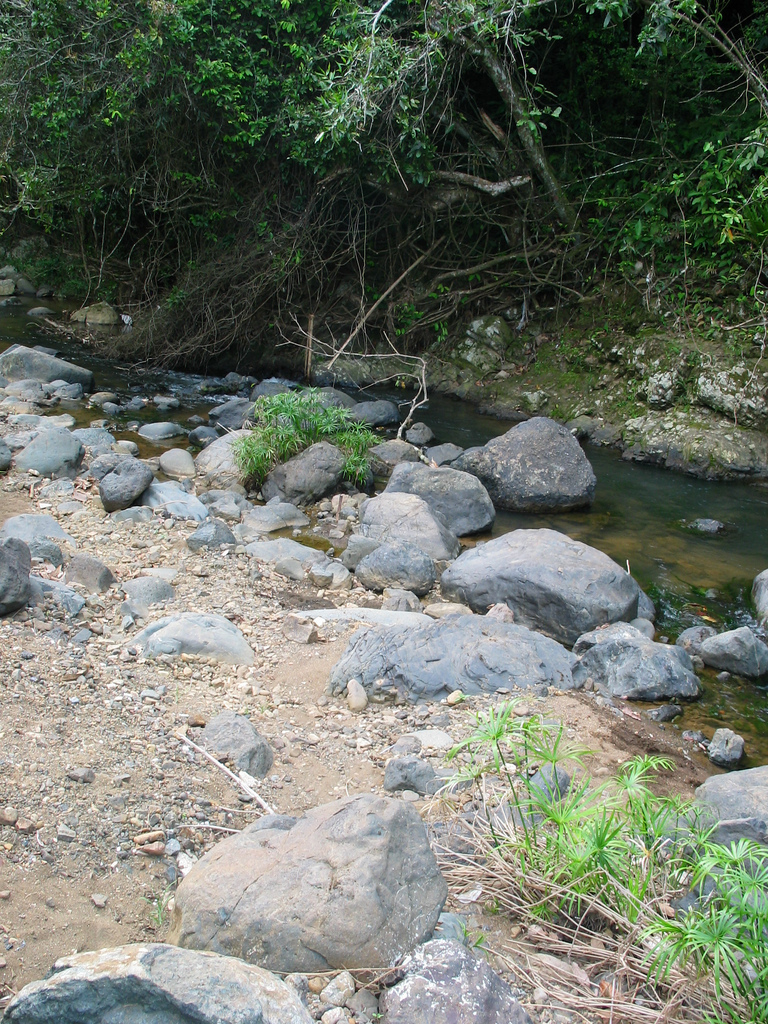
- Río Chiquito in Montes Llanos, Ponce
- Native name: Río Chiquito (Spanish)

Location
- Commonwealth: Puerto Rico
- Municipality: Ponce

Physical characteristics
- Source
  - location: Barrio Montes Llanos
  - coordinates: 18.0330201°N 66.6135062°W
  - elevation: 1,170 feet (360 m)
- Mouth
  - location: Río Portugués
  - elevation: 98 feet (30 m)
- Length: 9.5 km (5.9 mi)

Basin features
- Progression: Montes Llanos; Portugués
- River system: Río Bucaná
- Tributaries
  - left: Quebrada del Pastillo

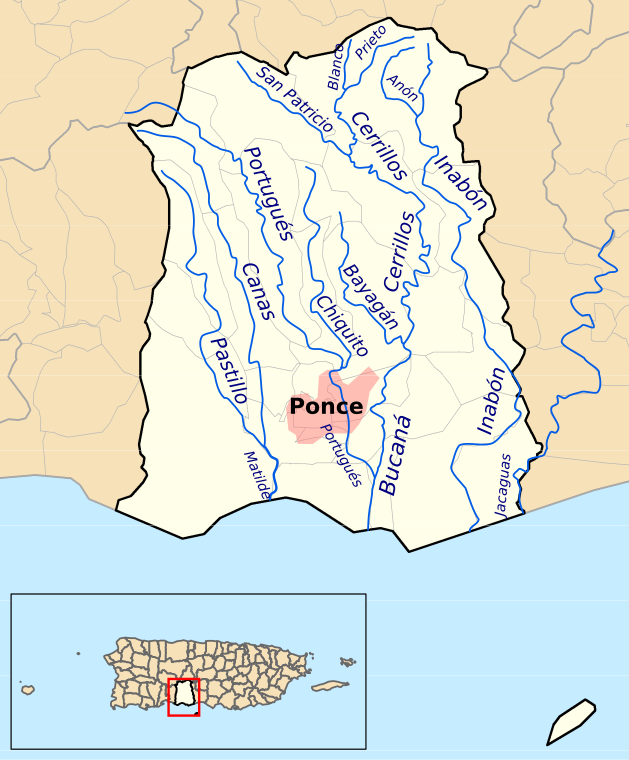
Map showing the location of Río Chiquito among the other rivers in the municipality. The area in pink represents the urban zone of the city

Chiquito River (Spanish: Río Chiquito) is a river in the municipality of Ponce, Puerto Rico. This river feeds into Río Portugués in the sector called Parras, about 0.5 km (0.3 mi) north of the intersection of PR-504 and PR-505. It has its origin in the mountains west of Montes Llanos. Río Chiquito is fed by Quebrada del Pastillo. This river is one of the 14 rivers in the municipality of Ponce.

== Origin ==
Río Chiquito has its origin in barrio Montes Llanos at an altitude of 390 meters (1,280 ft). It forms in the area north of Camino Paseo del Río and west of Camino Paseo Panorámico II, in south central Montes Llanos, about half kilometer west of PR-505, and approximately 1 mile (1.6 km) north of the northern terminus of PR-504.

== Course ==
Río Chiquito runs from south central barrio Montes Llanos into north central barrio Portugués dividing barrio Portugués lengthwise from north to south into essentially two equal halves. It crosses several times the east-to-west Camino La Cuchilla Road as it continues southward. After this, the river is found next to the western edge of PR-588, also known as Camino Río Chiquito, until PR-588 comes to its southern terminus where it meets PR-504. From this point onward Río Chiquito runs southward along the western edge of PR-504 for approximately 600 meters (2,000 ft) until it crosses PR-504 eastward.

The following table summarizes the course of Río Chiquito in terms of roads crossed. Roads are listed as the river flows from its origin in the mountains of Montes Llanos, north of the city of Ponce, to its feeding into Río Portugués in Barrio Portugués (N/A = Data not available):

No.	Barrio	Road	Road's km marker	NBI ID	Bridge name (if any)	Direction (of bridge traffic)	Coordinates	Notes
1	Montes Llanos	Camino La Zarza	not marked	29141	Unnamed	Both	18°4′6.492″N 66°37′14.1594″W	0.1 km NW of Iglesia Catolica San Vicente de Paul, Bo. Portugués; 0.3 km off PR-588 at km 0.3
2	Montes Llanos	PR-588	1.5	17841	Unnamed	Both	18°3′47.268″N 66°37′6.7794″W	0.3 km NE of INT PR-504 and PR-588
3	Portugués	PR-504	2.3	N/A	Unnamed	Both	18°3′3.636″N 66°36′55.368″W	0.5 km N of Iglesia Bautista Río Chiquito, IBRC (ICRC is located at PR-504, km 1.8). Note: From this point south, Río Chiquito flows east of PR-504)
4	Portugués	Camino Reraplen	not marked	N/A	Unnamed	Both	18°2′51.9″N 66°36′45.72″W	Camino Reraplan, across Iglesia Bautista de Río Chiquito
5	Portugués	PR-504	1.0	14231	Unnamed	Both	18°2′30.7674″N 66°36′33.0474″W	3 km NE of Ponce; between Av Federal (aka, Calle A) & Ponce Housing
6	Portugués	Calle A (aka, Av Federal)	not marked	15241	Unnamed	Both	18°2′30.0834″N 66°36′30.0234″W	0.1 km E of PR-504 at PR-504, km.; 1.5 km N of Plaza Las Delicias [This was part of the former course of the river]
7	Portugués	PR-10	6.0	N/A	Unnamed	Both	18°2′20.0034″N 66°36′22.2834″W	1.5 km N of Plaza Las Delicias [This was part of the former course of the river]
8	Portugués	Calle La Plata	not marked	22631	Unnamed	Both	18°2′10.5714″N 66°36′27.2874″W	1.5 km NW of Plaza Las Delicias; at Comunidad Dos Rios. [This was part of the former course of the river]

== Former and current course ==
For flood control purposes, Río Chiquito was diverted by the United States Army Corps of Engineers so that it would merge with Río Portugués about one-half-mile (0.80 km) further north from its original natural merge, this merging them in a less populated area that where they initially merged.

=== Former course ===
The former course of Río Chiquito, prior to being diverted by the US Army Corps of Engineers, followed from the area just east of PR-504, at N 18.04262 W 66.60911, and headed southeast crossing Avenida Federal (aka, Calle A), and continued southeast for some 500 feet (150 m) after which it took a southerly turn before crossing today's PR-10 (PR-10 had not been built then). After crossing the area of today's PR-10 it then took a southwesterly course for some 1,000 feet (300 m), becoming the boundary line between Barrio Portugués and Barrio Machuelo Abajo After these 3,000-foot (910 m) runs, and continuing as the boundary between the two barrios, Río Chiquito took a sharp southerly turn to cross Calle La Plata in the neighborhood of Villa Dos Rios. From there, and still marking the barrios boundary, it traveled some 300 feet (91 m), still southward, before taking a sharp turn west-southwest (WSW) to squeeze itself between Calle Barrio Coquí of Barrio Portugués to the west and Calle Platino of Barrio Machuelo Arriba to the east. A few hundred feet after this Río Chiquito took its final turn, to the west, before it came to an end at its feeding into Río Portugués at N 18.03258 W 66.61397.

=== Current course ===
Once the US Army Corps of Engineers diverted its course of Río Chiquito, the last kilometer or so (about 0.7 mile) of the river disappeared, as Río Chiquito came to feed into Río Portugués some 0.5 km north of its initial feeding point.

Running southward along the eastern edge of PR-504, Río Chiquito now crosses PR-504 to feed into Río Portugués some 300 meters (980 ft) west of the PR-504 bridge, where Río Chiquito ends. This southern terminus for the river occurs 250 feet (76 m) north of PR-10, 250 feet east of PR-503, and 250 feet west of PR-504. At its mouth, Río Chiquito has an elevation of 98 feet.

The net effect of the change in the course of the river is that Río Chiquito now feeds into Río Portugués immediately north of PR-10, whereas prior to the change it fed into Río Portugués to the south of PR-10.

== See also ==
- List of rivers of Puerto Rico
- List of rivers of Ponce
