= Puerto Rico Highway 505 =

Highway in Puerto Rico

Highway 505
- Ruta 505
- Carretera La Guardarraya

Route information
- Maintained by Puerto Rico DTPW
- Length: 16.4 km (10.2 mi)

Major junctions
- South end: PR-139 in Machuelo Arriba
- PR-504 in Machuelo Arriba–Montes Llanos–Portugués
- North end: PR-503 in San Patricio

Location
- Country: United States
- Territory: Puerto Rico
- Municipalities: Ponce

Highway system
- Roads in Puerto Rico; List
| ← PR-504 | → PR-506 |

Puerto Rico Highway 505 (PR-505) is a tertiary state highway in Ponce, Puerto Rico. This roads extends from PR-139 in Barrio Machuelo Arriba to PR-503 in Barrio San Patricio.

== Route description ==
PR-505 runs north to south, in a general SSE direction, and mostly alongside Bayagán River in barrio Machuelo Arriba. Its southern terminus is at its intersection with PR-14, near PR-10 and PR-139. The road connects Barrio San Patricio to the urban area of city of Ponce.

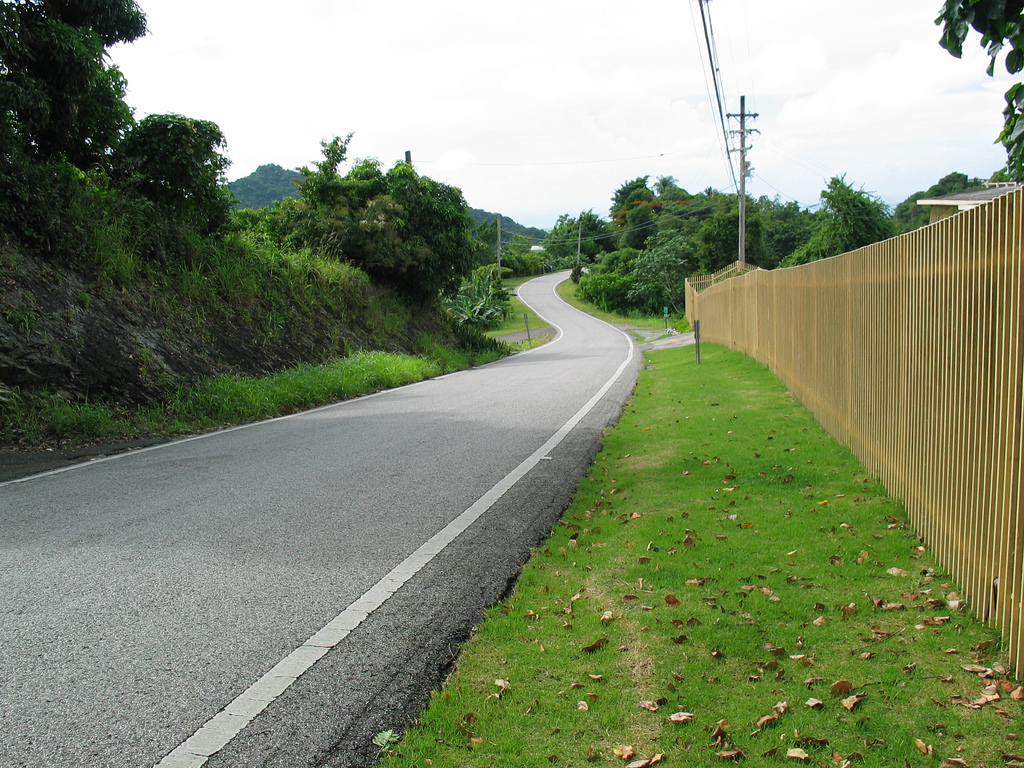
A stretch of Puerto Rico Highway 505 (PR-505) southbound in Barrio Machuelo Arriba, Ponce, Puerto Rico

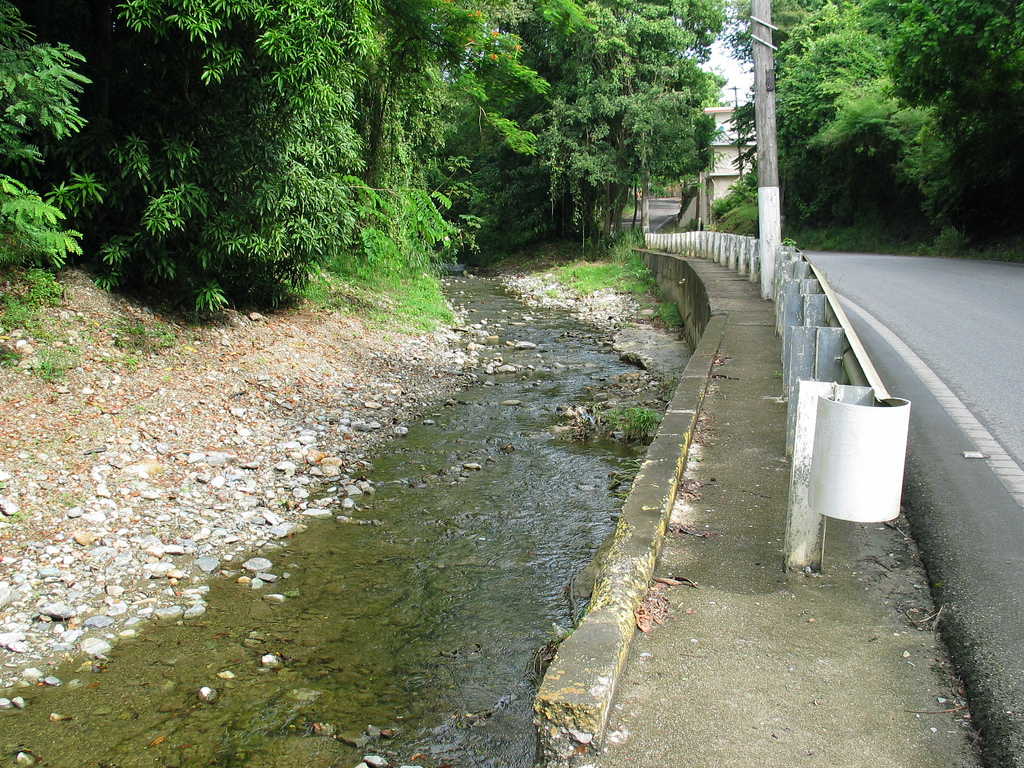
Río Bayagán running alongside Puerto Rico Highway 505 (PR-505) in Barrio Machuelo Arriba, Ponce, Puerto Rico

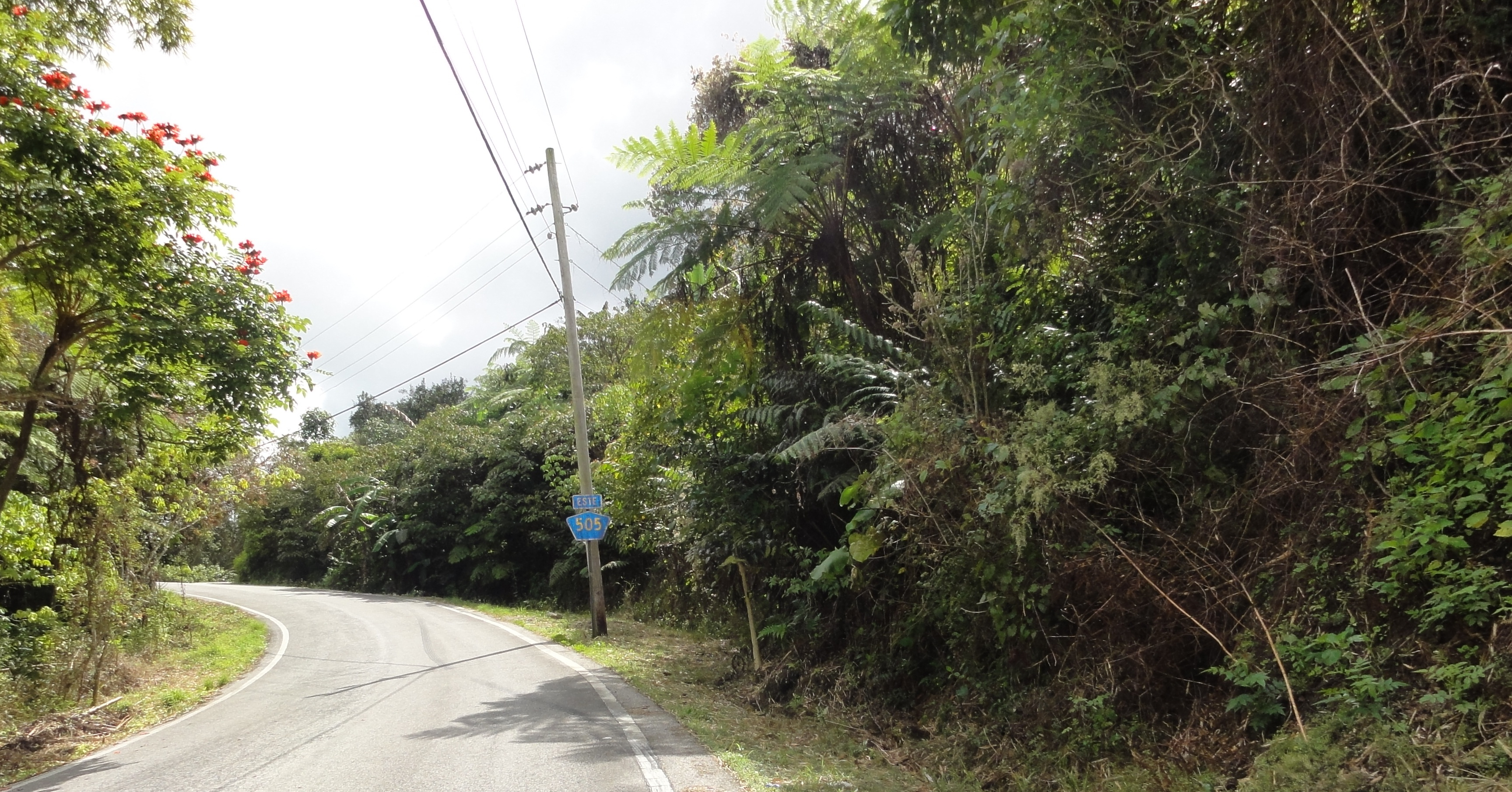
PR-505 traveling eastbound in Barrio San Patricio, Ponce, Puerto Rico

=== Communities served ===
The road and serves the communities of La Mocha, Montes Llanos, and Hogares Seguros, among others. The community of "La Yuca" is also on PR-505, at km 11.3, in the jurisdiction of Barrio Machuelo Arriba.

== Major intersections ==
The entire route is located in Ponce.

| Location | km | mi | Destinations | Notes |
|---|---|---|---|---|
| Machuelo Arriba | 0.0 | 0.0 | PR-139 – Ponce, Jayuya | Southern terminus of PR-505 |
| Machuelo Arriba–Montes Llanos– Portugués tripoint | 7.2 | 4.5 | PR-504 – Ponce | |
| San Patricio | 16.4 | 10.2 | PR-503 (Carretera David Medina Feliciano) – Adjuntas, Jayuya | Northern terminus of PR-505 |
1.000 mi = 1.609 km; 1.000 km = 0.621 mi

== See also ==
- List of highways in Ponce, Puerto Rico
