= Letras de Ponce =

Landmark in Ponce, Puerto Rico

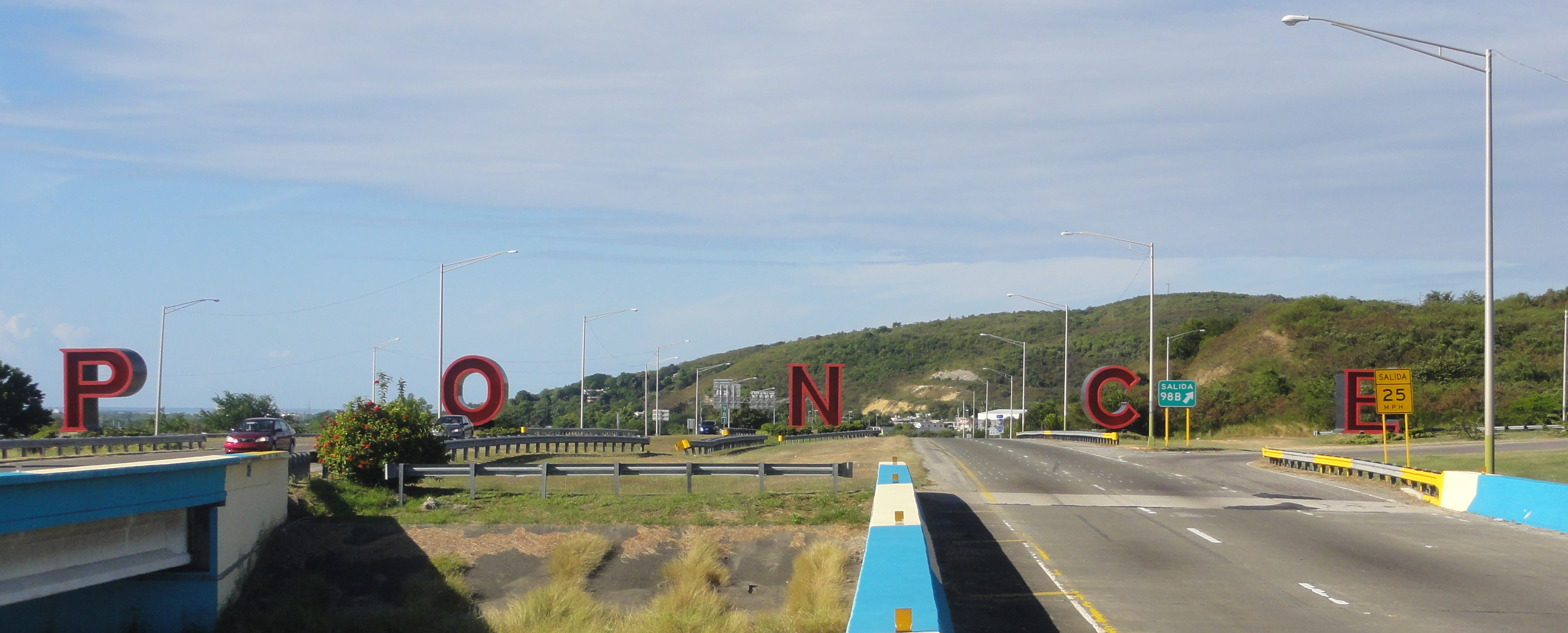
- Letras de P-O-N-C-E in Barrio Sabanetas, Ponce, Puerto Rico
- Interactive map of the Letras de Ponce area

General information
- Architectural style: Modern
- Location: Ponce, Puerto Rico
- Coordinates: 18°01′31.51″N 66°34′12.86″W
- Construction started: 2003
- Completed: January 2004
- Cost: US$430,000
- Client: Puerto Rico Department of Transportation

Technical details
- Structural system: Marina steel
- Size: 20 ft (6.1 m) high, 18 ft (5.5 m) wide, 12 ft (3.7 m) deep

Design and construction
- Architect: Carlos A. Rivera Villafañe

The Letras de Ponce (English: Ponce letters) is a famous landmark in Barrio Sabanetas in Ponce, Puerto Rico, located southbound on PR-52 at the intersection with PR-10. The iconic monument consists of five letters that spell the name of the city P-O-N-C-E in 20-foot high (6.1 m) by 18-foot wide (5.5 m) by 12-foot deep (3.7 m) red and black letters. The letters, and its resulting sign, were designed by Carlos Rivera Villafañe, a sculptor from Ponce. The landmark is said to be "known to every Puerto Rican."

== History ==
In 2002 the Puerto Rico Department of Transportation presented a contest for the design of a monument to be placed on State Route 52 (PR-52), at the entrance of the city of Ponce. The contest was part of what would become 97 projects of public art spread throughout Puerto Rico.

In selecting the work of art, the Government of Puerto Rico considered 318 submissions from hundreds of artists around the world, including Ada Bobonis, Ann Hamilton, Antoni Muntadas, Liliana Porter, and Devorah Sperber. Rivera Villafañe's proposal was one of the winners, and the winner for the Ponce entrance monument.

== Construction and design ==
The letters are built of "marine steel", also known as Cor-Ten, the same material used in the construction of ships. Each letter measures 20 feet high by 18 feet wide by 12 feet deep. Together they span an area of half a kilometer. The breadth of the letters is intended to symbolize the extension of the city of Ponce, "heightening Ponce's urban identity and raising it to its territorial extension." The letters cost US$430,000. Its design, manufacture and suiting all were done in Puerto Rico.

== Carlos A. Rivera Villafañe ==
Carlos A. Rivera Villafañe was born in Ponce in 1966. He graduated from the Escuela de Artes Graficas de Puerto Rico in San Juan, Puerto Rico with a bachelor's degree in 1989. In addition to the Letras de Ponce, Rivera Villafañe has works in San Juan, Madrid, Lima, Havana, Cuenca, Slovenia, Yugoslavia, New York City, and Miami.

== Maintenance ==
The monument is regularly maintained with fresh paint as recommended by its designer. They require special care as well as a special paint. They are painted in black and red, the traditional colors of the city of Ponce. The monument is also painted after acts of vandalism, including graffiti.

== Location ==
The monument is located on smooth, flat terrain, and each letter is surrounded by flowers. Its site is just outside the northeastern edge of the urban area of Ponce, on PR-52, the main road into Ponce from San Juan. While the monument is visible as motorists approach the city on the highway, it has been noted that motorists are not able to stop to admire it, as they risk being fined.

The monument's unique location made it an ideal site to hold a protest. In October 2009, a group of some 20 Government of Puerto Rico public employees used the site to launch a protest against their recent layoff.

- 18°01′31.51″N 66°34′12.86″W

== Alterations and vandalism ==
It is illegal to make unauthorized physical alterations to the sign. The letters have been vandalised a few times. In November 2011, the letter "O" was vandalised with graffiti.

== Controversy ==
Due to its location at the center and both sides of a major expressway, it is one of Puerto Rico's most controversial works of public art. In April 2009, the Puerto Rico Department of Transportation and Public Works (DTOP) was fined almost US$80 million for placing the letters there. Subsequently, a bill was introduced into the Legislature of Puerto Rico to eliminate public art from Puerto Rico roads. The basis was that, allegedly, they were in violation of the Federal Highway Administration regulations. In February 2010, it was agreed that the letters would stay where they were.
