= San Patricio, Ponce, Puerto Rico =

Barrio of Puerto Rico

San Patricio
- Barrio
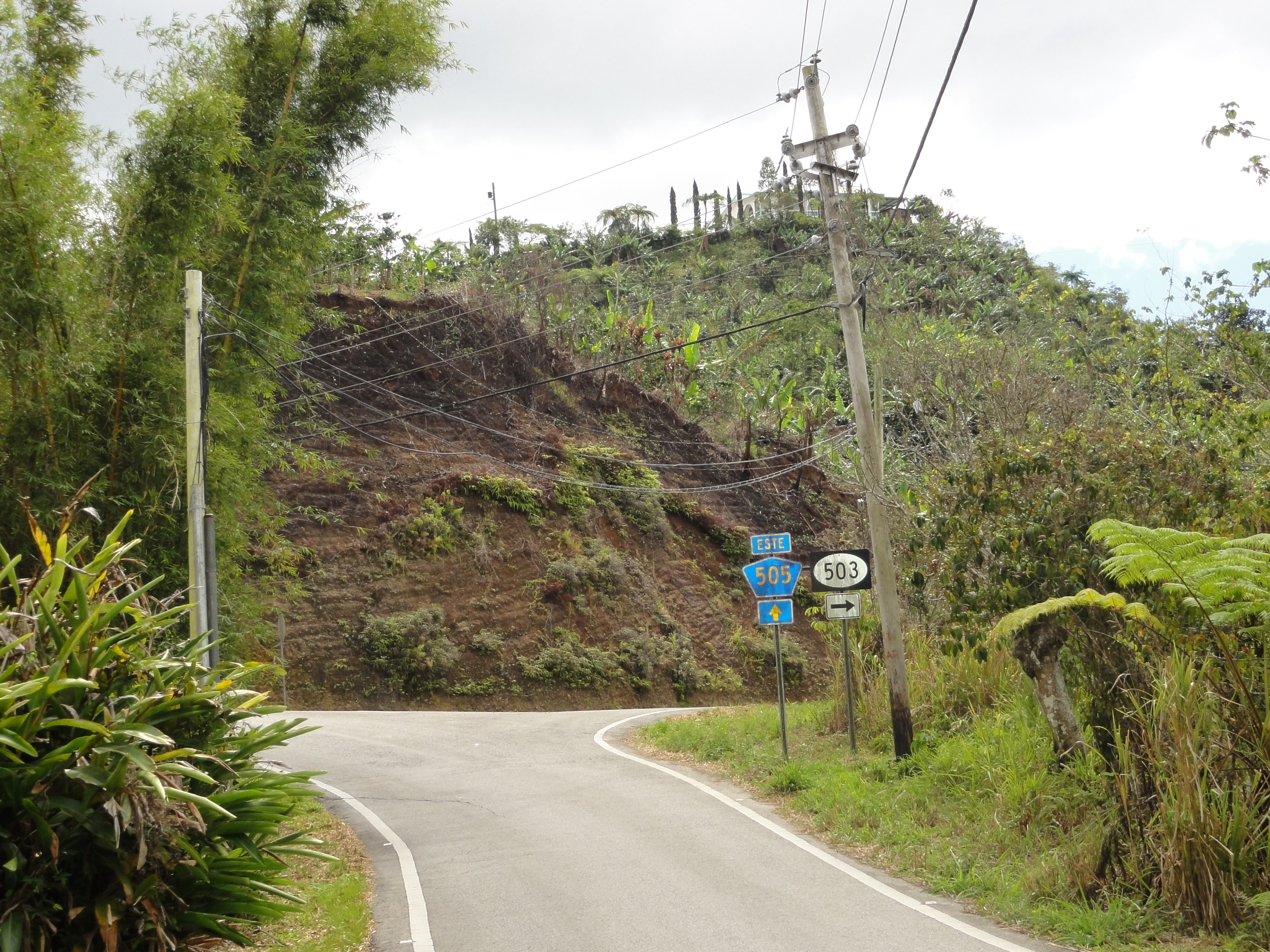
- Street scene at PR-503 South and PR-505 in Barrio San Patricio, Ponce, Puerto Rico

- Location of barrio San Patricio within the municipality of Ponce shown in red

- Location of Puerto Rico
- Coordinates: 18°08′10″N 66°38′34″W
- Commonwealth: Puerto Rico
- Municipality: Ponce

Area
  - Total: 6.85 sq mi (17.7 km^{2})
  - Land: 6.85 sq mi (17.7 km^{2})
  - Water: 0 sq mi (0 km^{2})
- Elevation: 2,103 ft (641 m)

Population (2010)
  - Total: 564
  - Density: 82.3/sq mi (31.8/km^{2})
- Source: 2010 Census
- Time zone: UTC−4 (AST)

San Patricio is one of the 31 barrios of the municipality of Ponce, Puerto Rico. It is one of the municipality's nine bordering barrios, along with Anón, Coto Laurel, Guaraguao, Quebrada Limón, Real, and Marueño, and the coastal barrios of Canas and Capitanejo. Its northern edge borders the municipalities of Utuado and Jayuya. It was founded in 1878. Barrio San Patricio is one of three Ponce barrios (the others are Barrio Guaraguao and Barrio Anón) located on the Cordillera Central mountain range.

== Location ==
San Patricio is a rural and mountainous barrio located in the northern section of the municipality, north of downtown Ponce, at latitude 18.133586 N, and longitude -66.636444 W. The toponymy, or origin of the name, is related to the Catholic Church saint San Patricio.

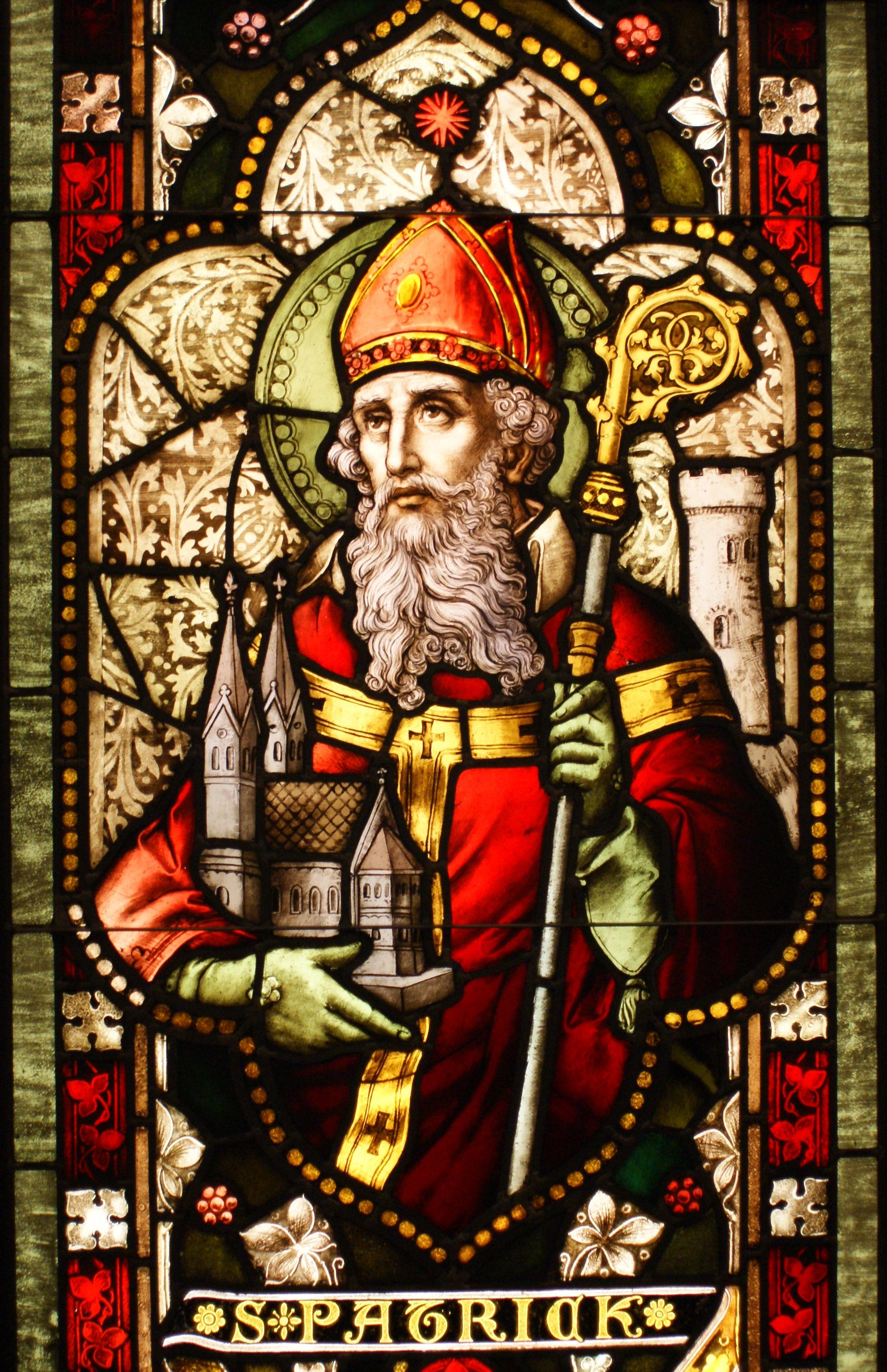
San Patrick after whom the barrio is named.

== Boundaries ==
It is bounded on the North by PR-143 (Ruta Panorámica), on the South by PR-505 and Pasto II Road, on the West by PR-503 (roughly), Los Banch Road, PR-10 (roughly), and on the East by Tres Palos Road, Tres Palos Ramili Road, PR-139 (Ramal/No Name), and El Seto II Road.

In terms of barrio-to-barrio boundaries, San Patricio is bounded in the North by Barrio Consejo of the municipality of Utuado, and Barrios Pica and Jauca of the municipality of Jayuya, in the South by Tibes and Montes Llanos, in the West by Barrio Portugues of the municipality of Adjuntas and barrio Guaraguao, and in the East by barrios Anón and Maragüez. Bordering three municipalities, San Patricio has the distinction of bordering more municipalities than any of the other barrios of Ponce.

== Features and demographics ==
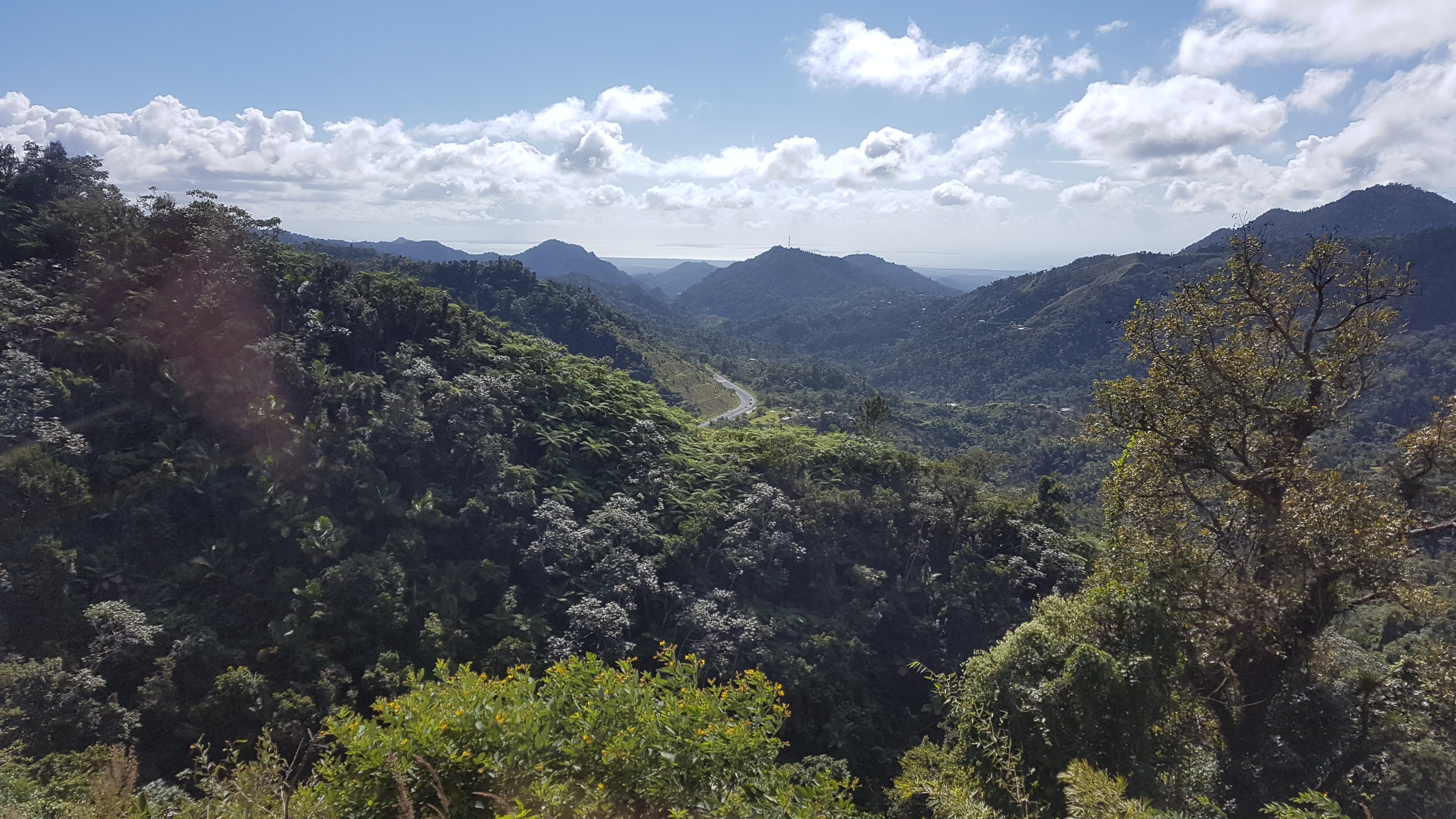
A view from Barrio San Patricio, looking south. PR-10 can be seen in the distance and the island of Caja de Muertos is in the far background

The community of La Gloria is located in the northern part of barrio San Patricio. Roads servicing San Patricio include PR-10 in the southwestern section of its territory, PR-503 and PR-505 in the central section of the barrio, and PR-143 in the northern edge.

San Patricio has 6.9 square miles (18 km^{2}) of land area and no water area. In 2000, the population of San Patricio was 465 persons, and it had a density of 68 persons per square mile. It is the least densely populated barrio of the municipality of Ponce. It is also the second least populated, after Montes Llanos. One of its communities is named La Mocha.

In 2010, the population of San Patricio was 564 persons, and it had a density of 82.3 persons per square mile.

The highest point in Barrio San Patricio stands at 2,804 feet and is located at the extreme northwestern tip of the barrio.

Historical population
Census	Pop.	Note	%±
1900	1,217		—
1910	1,036		−14.9%
1920	1,340		29.3%
1930	999		−25.4%
1940	943		−5.6%
1950	1,099		16.5%
1960	939		−14.6%
1970	597		−36.4%
1980	115		−80.7%
1990	612		432.2%
2000	465		−24.0%
2010	564		21.3%
U.S. Decennial Census; 1899 (shown as 1900) 1910-1930; 1930-1950 1960 1980-2000 2010

== Landmarks ==
Barrio San Patricio is the origin of Río San Patricio.

== See also ==
- List of communities in Puerto Rico
