= Cerrillos, Ponce, Puerto Rico =

Barrio of Puerto Rico

Cerrillos
- Barrio
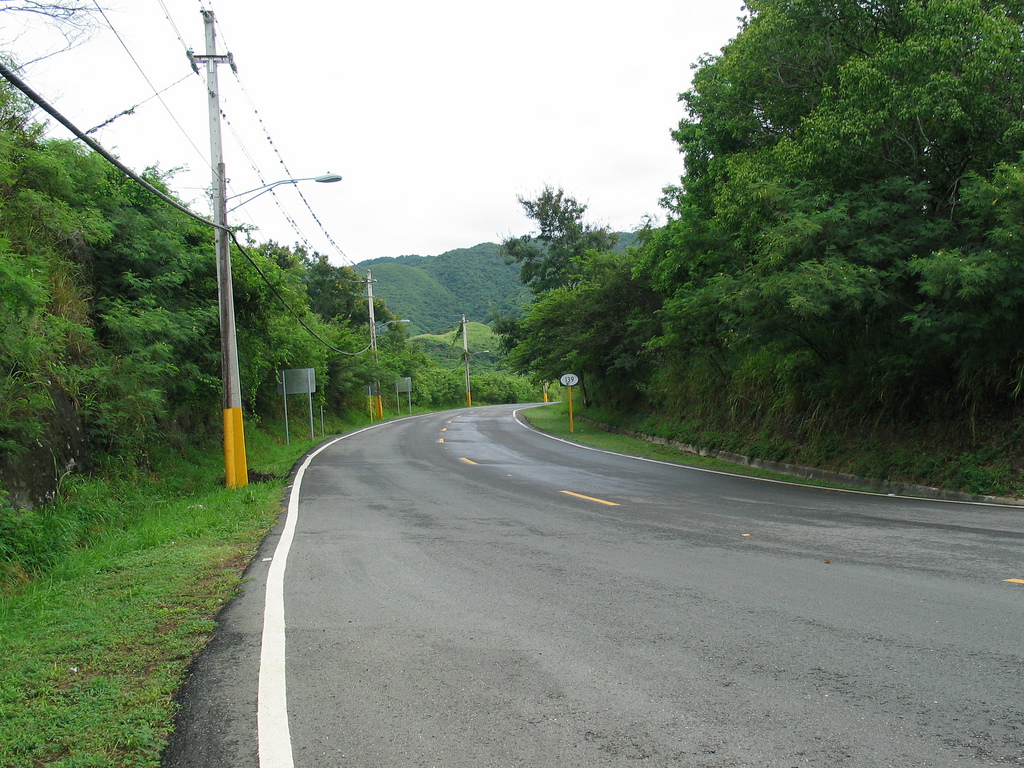
- A section of rural Barrio Cerrillos along PR-139 heading northbound

- Location of barrio Cerrillos within the municipality of Ponce shown in red

- Location of Puerto Rico in the Caribbean
- Coordinates: 18°03′21″N 66°34′21″W
- Commonwealth: Puerto Rico
- Municipality: Ponce

Area
  - Total: 3.33 sq mi (8.6 km^{2})
  - Land: 3.13 sq mi (8.1 km^{2})
  - Water: 0.20 sq mi (0.52 km^{2})
- Elevation: 312 ft (95 m)

Population (2010)
  - Total: 4,356
  - Density: 1,400.6/sq mi (540.8/km^{2})
- Source: 2010 Census
- Time zone: UTC−4 (AST)

Cerrillos is one of the 31 barrios of the municipality of Ponce, Puerto Rico. Along with Magueyes, Tibes, Portugués, Montes Llanos, Maragüez, and Machuelo Arriba, Cerrillos is one of the municipality's seven interior rural barrios. It was founded in 1878.

== Location ==
Cerrillos is located in the eastern section of the municipality, northeast of the city of Ponce, at latitude 18.050848 N, and longitude -66.576027 W.

== Boundaries ==
Cerrillos is bounded on the North by the hills north of route PR-587 and Río Cerrillos, on the South by El Monte Street (roughly), Guilarte Street (roughly), and Madrid Street (roughly), on the West by Río Cerrillos, and on the East by the hills east of PR-587, the eastern edge of Lake Number 5, and Palmarejo Road.

In terms of barrio-to-barrio boundaries, Cerrillos is bounded on the North by barrios Maragüez and Real, in the South by barrios Sabanetas and Coto Laurel, in the West by barrio Machuelo Arriba, and in the East by barrios Real and Coto Laurel.

== Features and demographics ==
Cerrillos is home to four lakes, named Lake Number Two through Lake Number Five. Despite its name, Cerrillos Lake is not located in Barrio Cerrillos, but in neighboring Maragüez. Lake Cerrillos is named after the river that feeds it, Rio Cerrillos, which does run through barrio Cerillos. The communities of Ponderosa, Valle Alto, Portales del Monte, Haciendas del Monte, Mansiones del Sur, Mansiones de Ponce, Mansiones del Lago, and Cerillo Hoyo are located in barrio Cerrillos.

Cerrillos has 3.1 square miles (8.0 km^{2}) of land area and 0.2 square miles (520,000 m^{2}) of water area. In 2000, the population of Cerrillos was 4,281. The population density in Cerrillos was 1,380 people per square mile. Major roads serving Barrio Cerrillos are PR-14 on the southern area, PR-587 in the northern sections, and PR-139 and PR-5139 in the western portion of the barrio.

In 2010, the population of Cerrillos was 4,356 persons, and it had a density of 1,400.6 persons per square mile.

The highest point in Barrio Cerrillos stands at 1,050 feet and is located at the northernmost tip of the barrio.

Historical population
Census	Pop.	Note	%±
1900	518		—
1910	552		6.6%
1920	472		−14.5%
1930	1,200		154.2%
1940	631		−47.4%
1950	805		27.6%
1960	908		12.8%
1970	1,048		15.4%
1980	2,455		134.3%
1990	3,523		43.5%
2000	4,284		21.6%
2010	4,356		1.7%
U.S. Decennial Census; 1899 (shown as 1900) 1910–1930; 1930–1950 1960 1980–2000 2010

== See also ==
- List of communities in Puerto Rico
