= Puerto Rico Highway 504 =

Highway in Puerto Rico

Highway 504
- Ruta 504

Route information
- Maintained by Puerto Rico DTPW
- Length: 6.9 km (4.3 mi)

Major junctions
- South end: PR-10 / PR-503 in Portugués
- PR-588 in Portugués
- North end: PR-505 in Machuelo Arriba–Portugués–Montes Llanos

Location
- Country: United States
- Territory: Puerto Rico
- Municipalities: Ponce

Highway system
- Roads in Puerto Rico; List
← PR-503	→ PR-505

Puerto Rico Highway 504 (PR-504) is a tertiary state highway in the municipality of Ponce in Puerto Rico. With a length of 6.9 km (4.3 mi), the road runs south to north, and mostly along the Río Chiquito in barrio Portugués Rural. Its southern terminus is at an intersection with PR-503, near PR-10 at the southern edge of Barrio Portugués, and the northern terminus is located at PR-505 on the Machuelo Arriba–Portugués–Montes Llanos tripoint.

== Route description ==
The road is a mountainous two-way one-lane road and thus very difficult to navigate when traffic is coming from the opposite direction. In addition most of the road has numerous steep sharp curves and should be driven only with vehicles in top mechanical condition, preferably all-wheel drive sedans, as drivers of SUVs reportedly feel less in control of their vehicles. The road should not be driven after nightfall.

The road is 6.9 km (4.3 mi) kilometers long. At kilometer mark 3.0 km (1.9 mi), PR-504 connects with PR-588 (also known as Camino Pandora or Camino Río Chiquito) heading west towards Sector El Hoyo. PR-588's northern terminus is at kilometer 7.2 km (4.5 mi) of PR-505 in Barrio Montes Llanos.

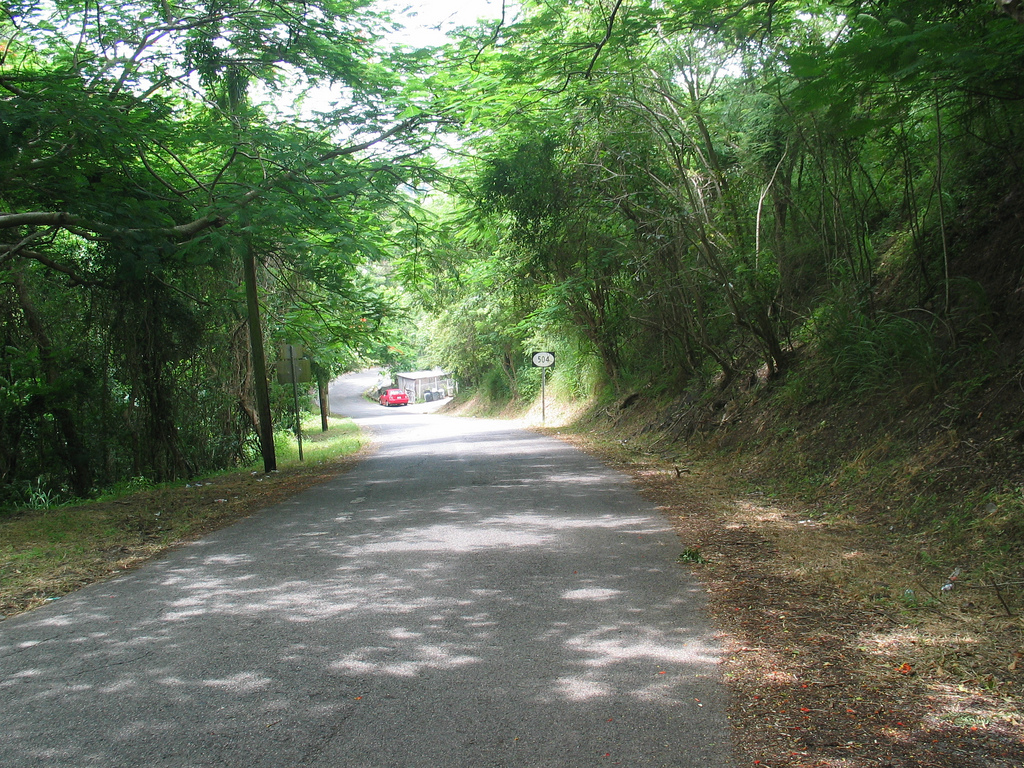
Puerto Rico Highway 504 heading south in Barrio Portugués Rural, Ponce, Puerto Rico

== Major intersections ==
The entire route is located in Ponce.

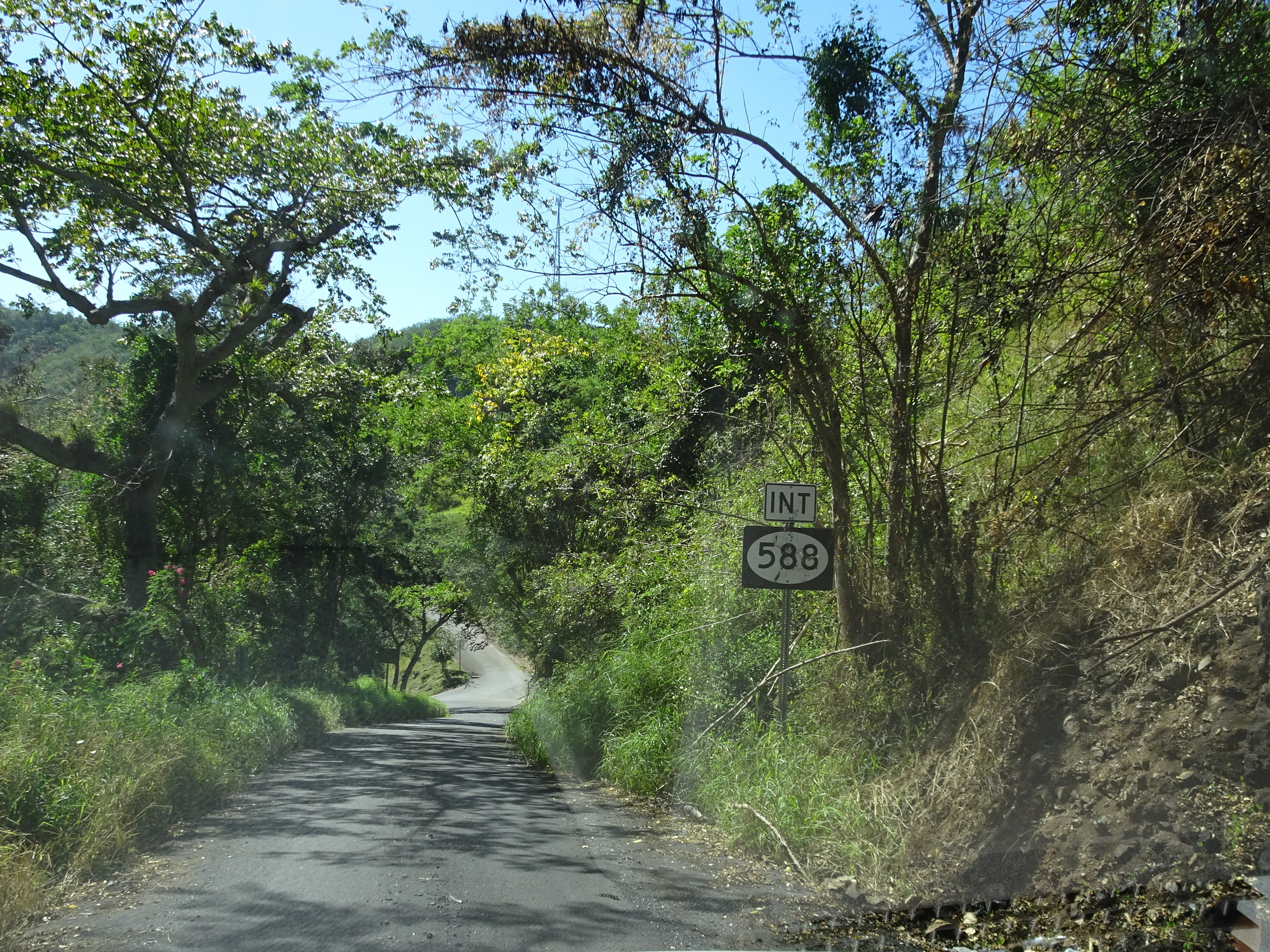
PR-504 heading south near PR-588 intersection in Barrio Portugués Rural

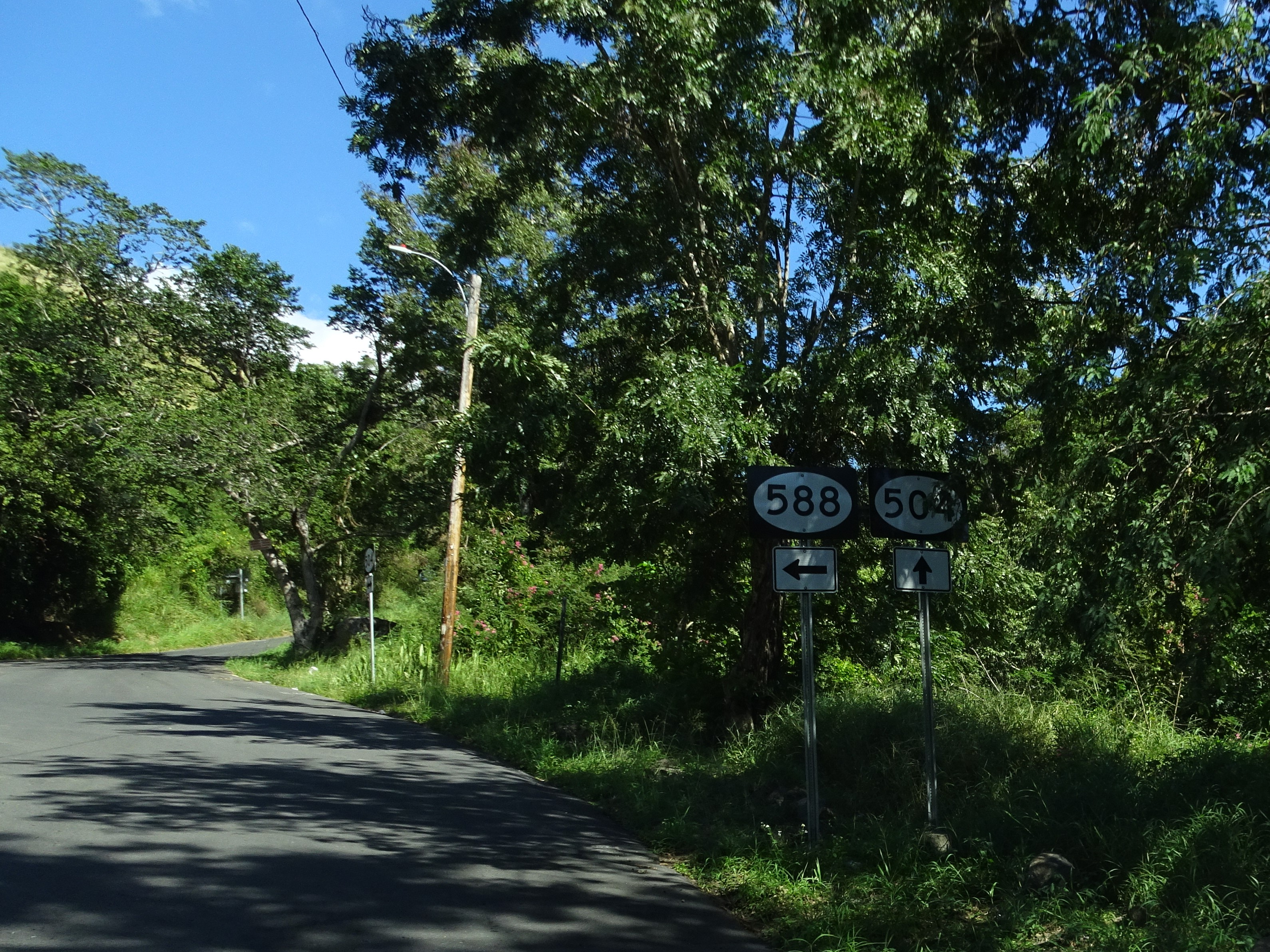
PR-504 heading north at PR-588 intersection in Barrio Portugués Rural

Location	km	mi	Destinations	Notes
Portugués	0.0	0.0	PR-10 (Carretera Salvador "Chiry" Vassallo Ruiz) / PR-503 (Carretera David Medina Feliciano) – Ponce, Adjuntas	Southern terminus of PR-504; partial cloverleaf interchange
Portugués	3.3	2.1	PR-588 – Portugués	
Machuelo Arriba–Portugués– Montes Llanos tripoint	6.9	4.3	PR-505 (Carretera La Guardarraya) – Adjuntas, Jayuya	Northern terminus of PR-504
1.000 mi = 1.609 km; 1.000 km = 0.621 mi

== See also ==
- List of highways in Ponce, Puerto Rico
