= Magueyes, Ponce, Puerto Rico =

Barrio of Puerto Rico

Magueyes
- Barrio
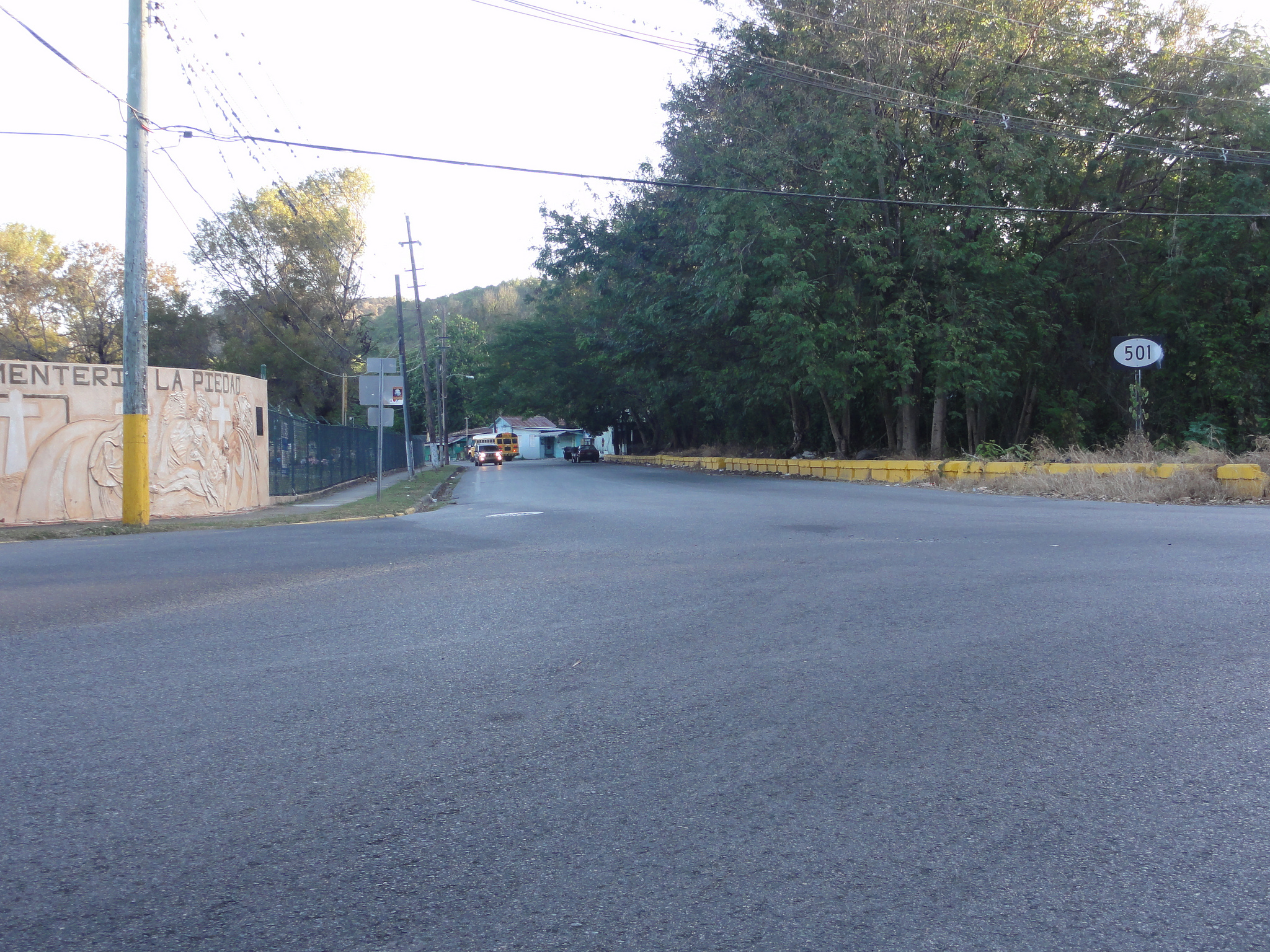
- Scene in Barrio Magueyes

- Location of barrio Magueyes within the municipality of Ponce shown in red

- Location of Puerto Rico
- Coordinates: 18°03′42″N 66°39′03″W
- Commonwealth: Puerto Rico
- Municipality: Ponce

Area
  - Total: 4.55 sq mi (11.8 km^{2})
  - Land: 4.55 sq mi (11.8 km^{2})
  - Water: 0 sq mi (0 km^{2})
- Elevation: 344 ft (105 m)

Population (2010)
  - Total: 5,947
  - Density: 1,307/sq mi (505/km^{2})
- Source: 2010 Census
- Time zone: UTC−4 (AST)

Magueyes is one of the 31 barrios of the municipality of Ponce, Puerto Rico. Together with Cerrillos, Machuelo Arriba, Maragüez, Montes Llanos, Portugués, Sabanetas, and Tibes, Magueyes is one of the municipality's eight interior barrios. The name of this barrio is of native Indian origin. It was created in 1831.

== History ==
Magueyes is one of the oldest barrios in Ponce. It is home to Hacienda Buena Vista, dating from 1833. The word Magueyes is the plural form of the word Maguey which is a word of Taino origin.

== Boundaries ==
Magueyes is bounded on the North by the hills north of Tierras Buenas Road and the hills south of Las Lomas Road, on the South by Ruth Fernandez Boulevard, on the West by the hills west of PR-123, and on the East by the hills east of PR-123 and by Ruth Fernandez Boulevard.

In terms of barrio-to-barrio boundaries, Magueyes is bounded on the North by Guaraguao, on the South by Magueyes Urbano and Portugues Urbano, in the West by Marueño and Canas, and on the East by Tibes and Portugués.

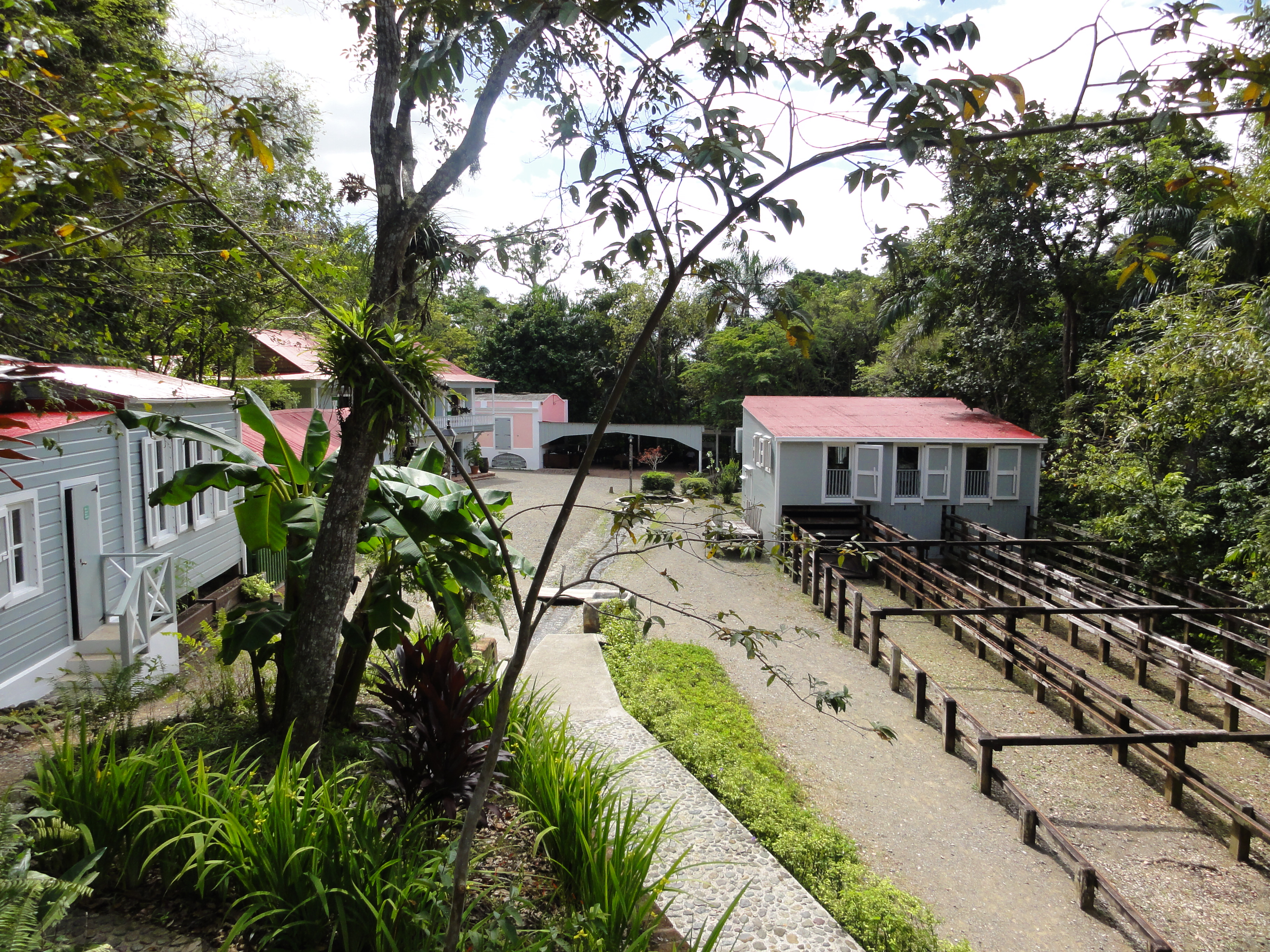
Museo Hacienda Buena Vista coffee plantation, is located off PR-123 in Barrio Magueyes

== Features and demographics ==
Magueyes has 4.56 square miles (12 km^{2}) of land area and no water surface area. In 2000, the population of Magueyes was 6,134 persons, and it had a density of 1,345 persons per square mile. Magueyes is the ninth most populous barrio in the municipality.

In 2010, the population of Magueyes was 5,947 persons, and it had a density of 1,307 persons per square mile.

Running all along the full length of Magueyes is Rio Canas, which effectively divides the barrio in two almost identically sized areas. The communities of Corral Viejo, Las Delicias, El Madrigal, Estancias de Country Club, Lomas de Country Club, Granada Hills, Reparto Lomas del Sol, Reparto El Valle, and (Parcelas) Magueyes proper are located in Magueyes.

The main road serving Barrio Magueyes is PR-123. PR-501 also makes a short appearance in the lower southwestern part of the barrio.

The highest point of barrio Magueyes stands at 2,066 feet and is located at the extreme northeast tip of the barrio.

Historical population
Census	Pop.	Note	%±
1900	1,171		—
1910	1,583		35.2%
1920	1,317		−16.8%
1930	1,516		15.1%
1940	1,691		11.5%
1950	1,654		−2.2%
1960	1,857		12.3%
1970	2,813		51.5%
1980	6,224		121.3%
1990	5,372		−13.7%
2000	6,134		14.2%
2010	5,947		−3.0%
U.S. Decennial Census; 1899 (shown as 1900) 1910-1930; 1930-1950 1960 1980-2000 2010

== Landmarks ==
Hacienda Buena Vista is located in Magueyes.

== See also ==
- List of communities in Puerto Rico
