= Consejo, Utuado, Puerto Rico =

Barrio of Puerto Rico

Consejo
- Barrio
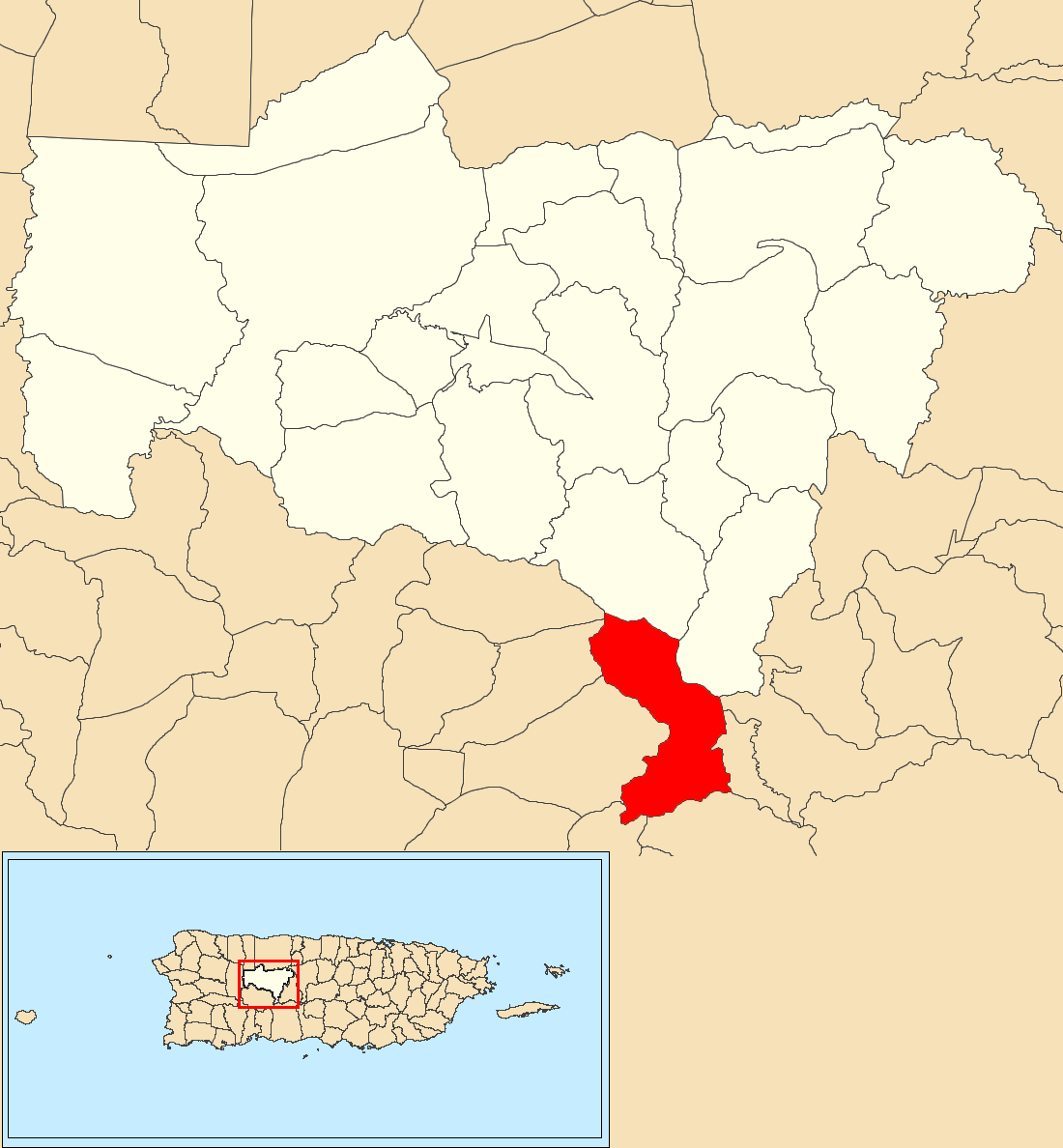
- Location of Consejo within the municipality of Utuado shown in red

- Location of Puerto Rico
- Coordinates: 18°10′40″N 66°40′05″W
- Commonwealth: Puerto Rico
- Municipality: Utuado

Area
  - Total: 4.18 sq mi (10.8 km^{2})
  - Land: 4.18 sq mi (10.8 km^{2})
  - Water: 0 sq mi (0 km^{2})
- Elevation: 2,067 ft (630 m)

Population (2010)
  - Total: 610
  - Density: 145.9/sq mi (56.3/km^{2})
- Source: 2010 Census
- Time zone: UTC−4 (AST)

Consejo is a barrio in the municipality of Utuado, Puerto Rico. Its population in 2010 was 610.

== History ==
Consejo was in Spain's gazetteers until Puerto Rico was ceded by Spain in the aftermath of the Spanish–American War under the terms of the Treaty of Paris of 1898 and became an unincorporated territory of the United States. In 1899, the United States Department of War conducted a census of Puerto Rico finding that the population of Consejo barrio was 929.

Historical population
Census	Pop.	Note	%±
1900	929		—
1910	778		−16.3%
1920	914		17.5%
1930	848		−7.2%
1940	982		15.8%
1950	780		−20.6%
1960	704		−9.7%
1970	543		−22.9%
1980	735		35.4%
1990	615		−16.3%
2000	538		−12.5%
2010	610		13.4%
U.S. Decennial Census; 1899 (shown as 1900) 1910-1930; 1930-1950 1980-2000 2010

== See also ==
- List of communities in Puerto Rico
