= Portugués (Ponce) =

Barrio of Ponce, Puerto Rico

- Barrio
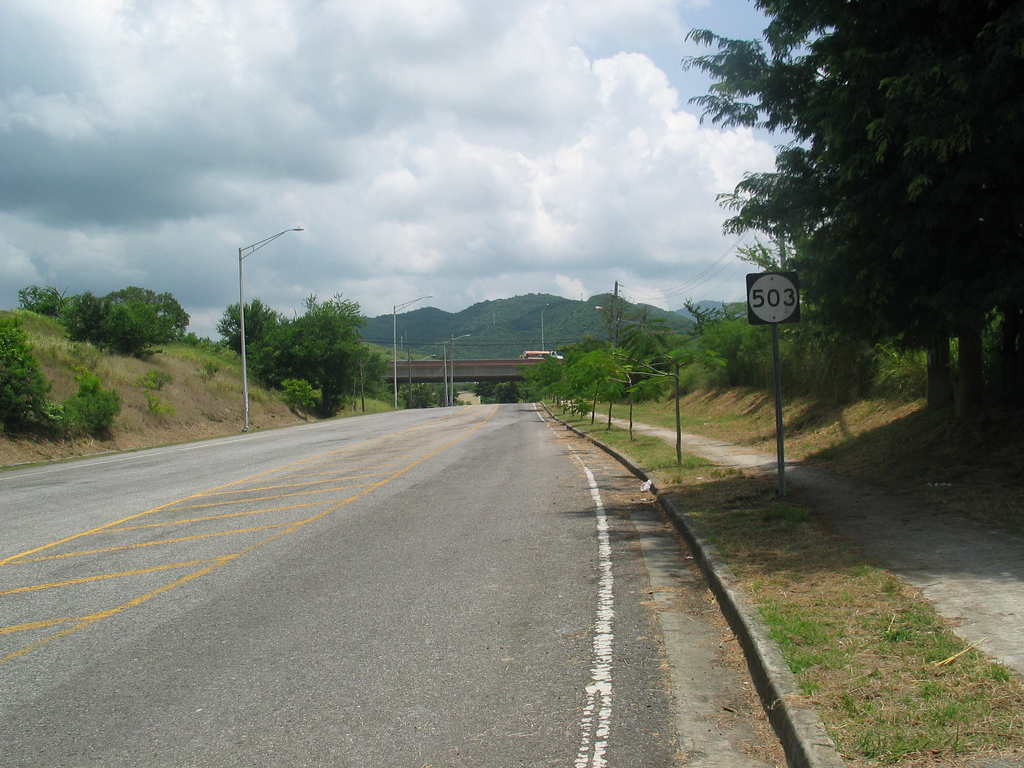
- Scene in Barrio Portugués on Highway PR-503 heading northbound

- Location of barrio Portugues within the municipality of Ponce shown in red

- Location of Puerto Rico
- Coordinates: 18°03′26″N 66°36′50″W
- Commonwealth: Puerto Rico
- Municipality: Ponce

Area
  - Total: 3.57 sq mi (9.2 km^{2})
  - Land: 3.55 sq mi (9.2 km^{2})
  - Water: 0.02 sq mi (0.052 km^{2})
- Elevation: 554 ft (169 m)

Population (2010)
  - Total: 4,134
  - Density: 1,167.8/sq mi (450.9/km^{2})
- Source: 2010 Census
- Time zone: UTC−4 (AST)

Portugués is one of the 31 barrios in the municipality of Ponce, Puerto Rico. Along with Magueyes, Tibes, Montes Llanos, Maragüez, Machuelo Arriba, Sabanetas, and Cerrillos, Portugués is one of the municipality's eight rural interior barrios. It was founded in 1831.

== Location ==
Portugués is a mountainous rural barrio located in the central section of the municipality, north of the city of Ponce. The Río Chiquito watershed runs along the middle of this barrio. Such geographic feature determines its form: it is long from north to south, and narrow from east to west. In a similar manner, the Río Portugués watershed runs alongside the neighboring barrio Tibes, immediately to the east of Barrio Portugues, and Rio Portugues enters Barrio Portugues on its southernmost region. (Note: It is important to know that the municipality of Adjuntas, which borders the municipality of Ponce to the north, also has a barrio named Portugues, situated in its mountainous zone, and this is where Ponce's Rio Portugues originates. The two barrios, however, are not themselves connected and are, in fact, considerably distant from each other.)

== Boundaries ==
Portugués is bounded on the North by the hills north of Pandura Road, on the South by Camino de Ponce (Golf Club) Street, Majagua Street, Arboleda Street, and PR-504, on the West by Turell Road, La Zarza Road, PR-10 (roughly), and on the East by PR-505, the hills west of Río Bayagán, the eastern slopes of El Gato Hill (Cerro El Gato) and First Street (Calle 1). In terms of barrio-to-barrio boundaries, Portugués is bounded in the North by Monte Llano, in the South by Portugues Urbano and Machuelo Arriba, in the West by Tibes and Magueyes, and in the East by Monte Llano and Machuelo Arriba.

== History ==
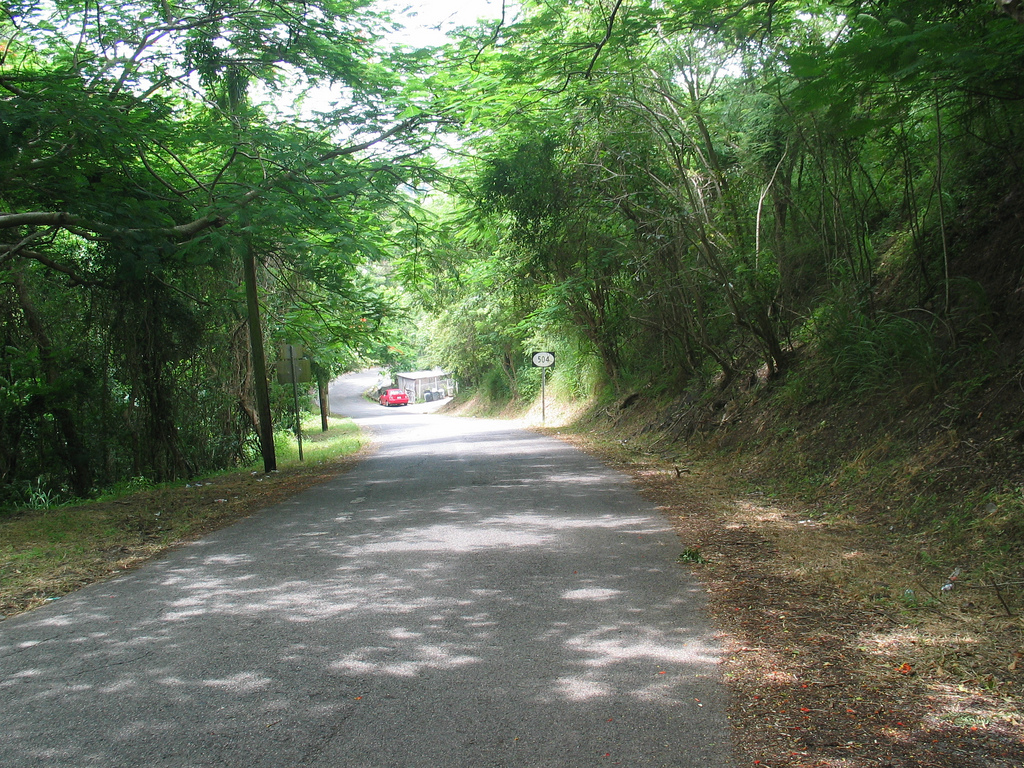
Puerto Rico Highway 504 (PR-504) heading South-bound in Barrio Portugues in Ponce, Puerto Rico

Río Portugués and the great Ceiba tree near the center of Ponce have long been associated with the first settlers of the region. During the 17th century the River marked the eastern boundary of a growing settlement than ran as far as Guayanilla Bay, a region that came to be known as Ponce, but which today is part of a neighboring municipality.

In 1824, Barrio Portugues appears for the first time in a list of the barrios of Ponce produced by Pedro Tomás de Córdova, and to whom we owe the first such listing of 497 barrios in the town that existed at the time. However, the name Barrio Portugues does not show up in records of the municipality of Ponce until September 1821. In 1822, Barrio Portugues appears as one of the barrios of the settlement with a listing of names of people responsible for the supervision of the barrios of the municipality. In 1878 Manuel Ubeda y Delgado reported that in Barrio Portugues there were 155 families residing in 33 houses and 100 bohios. Portugues was then the seventh least populated of the 22 barrios then established in the municipality. The same author reports the existence of some thermal baths in an area a little over 2 kilometers northeast of the city known as the Quintana Baths. The masonry building that house the baths still exists on the northbound side of Puerto Rico Highway 503 in Barrio Portugues.

=== Origin of the name ===
The name Hato de Portugués has been traced back to the Puerto Rico General Registry of Lands of November 1800. Hatos were holdings of large tracts of lands dedicated to cattle raising. They were the basic territorial units in Puerto Rico in until the late 19th century.

The name, however, may in fact be much older. Towards the end of the 16th century, even before the birth of the village of Ponce, Don Pedro Rodríguez de Guzmán (Note: Another source names this early settler "Pedro Perdomo de Guzmán". It is not clear which of the two names is the correct name, or if his name was perhaps Pedro Rodríguez Perdomo de Guzmán or some other variation. See Historia de Nuestros Barrios: Portugués, Ponce. Rafael Torrech San Inocencio. El Sur a la Vista. Ponce, Puerto Rico. Elsuralavista.com. 14 February 2010.) established a small community and a store on the banks of Río Baramaya. Rodríguez, one of the first settlers of what is known as Ponce today, is the original Portugués. Some sources state he was from Portugal, other sources state he was from San German but of Portuguese ancestry. According to historian Rafael Torrech San Inocencio, "the store of Rodríguez de Guzmán, a.k.a. “El Portugués” ("The Portuguese"), was located on the banks of Río Baramaya, possibly at a crossing, that is, at a place where it was possible to cross the river, whether afoot or on horseback, with relative ease. River crossings are very old place names, for during those years it was important to find a place to cross a river, and...many of the names of barrios and municipalities in Puerto Rico originated with such old river crossings. It is possible that as the years passed the fame of the Portugues Crossing faded away, and the names of the crossing and of the river were exchanged in everyday conversation, and folks started to call Río Portugues what was really Rio Baramaya. And, what is more, as time passed this unofficial name of the river was accidentally used to refer to the hato in that area, and thus, to today's Barrio Portugues."

== Features and demographics ==
Portugués has 3.52 square miles (9.1 km^{2}) of land area and 0.04 square miles (100,000 m^{2}) of water surface area. Its land area is three percent of the territory of the municipality of Ponce. It is thus the 15th largest of Ponce's 31 barrios.

In 2000, the population of Barrio Portugués was 4,882 persons, and it had a density of 1,387 persons per square mile. Barrio Portugues' population saw little change between 1990 and 2000.

In 2010, the population of Portugués was 4,134 persons, and it had a density of 1,167.8 persons per square mile.

The highest point in Barrio Portugués stands at 1,735 feet. Another notable land feature is Cerro El Gato which stands at 827 feet.

Historical population
Census	Pop.	Note	%±
1900	1,050		—
1910	1,090		3.8%
1920	1,077		−1.2%
1930	1,883		74.8%
1940	1,287		−31.7%
1950	1,073		−16.6%
1960	1,320		23.0%
1970	1,559		18.1%
1980	3,145		101.7%
1990	4,916		56.3%
2000	4,882		−0.7%
2010	4,134		−15.3%
U.S. Decennial Census; 1899 (shown as 1900) 1910-1930; 1930-1950 1960 1980-2000 2010

== Notable landmarks ==
Portugues is home to the Tibes Indigenous Ceremonial Center discovered in 1975 after hurricane rains uncovered pottery. The center is the site of the oldest cemetery uncovered up to date in the Antilles. "With some 200 skeletons unearthed from the year AD300, it is considered the largest and the most important archaeological find in the West Indies."

== Communities and roads ==
The communities of Villa Elena, Nuevo Mameyes, and El Señorial are located in this barrio of Ponce. Major roads serving Barrio Portugués are PR-9, PR-10, PR-503, PR-504, and PR-588. It also includes the community of Río Chiquito.

== In popular culture ==
The salsa song "La Parranda Fania" by Hector Lavoe (Fania Records, 2012) says "De Ponce hasta Comerio, nos vamos pa' Rio Chiquito..." (From Ponce to Comerio, we head to Rio Chiquito...)

== See also ==
- List of communities in Puerto Rico

== Bibliography ==
- U.S. Census Bureau. 2000 Census: Population and Housing. 2000.
- Junta de Planificación de Puerto Rico. Mapa de municipios y barrios, #27-Ponce. 1953.
- Comisión Estatal de Elecciones. Desglose de sectores y centros de votación de acuerdo a la redistribución electoral. 2000.
- U.S. Library of Congress. American Memory: Ponce County, Barrio Portugués. 2010.
- Pedro Tomás de Córdova. Memorias geográficas, históricas, económicas y estadísticas de la Isla de Puerto Rico, Volume IV. 1832.
- Manuel Ubeda y Delgado. Isla de Puerto Rico: estudio histórico, geográfico y estadístico de la misma. 1878.
- Francisco Suárez. Ponce. 2009.
- Ilia del Toro Robledo. Actas del Cabildo de Ponce, Puerto Rico 1812-1823. 1993.
- Carmelo Rosario Natal. A Orillas del Jacaguas: Historia de Villalba, La Ciudad Avancina. 1996.
- Manuel Álvarez Nazario Influjo Indígena en el Español de Puerto Rico, 1977; y El Habla Campesina del País. 1992.
- Rafael Torrech San Inocencio. Los barrios de Puerto Rico. 1999.
- Rafael Torrech San Inocencio. Orígenes, configuración y toponimia de los barrios de Puerto Rico. 1994.
