= Montes Llanos =

Barrio of Ponce, Puerto Rico

- Barrio
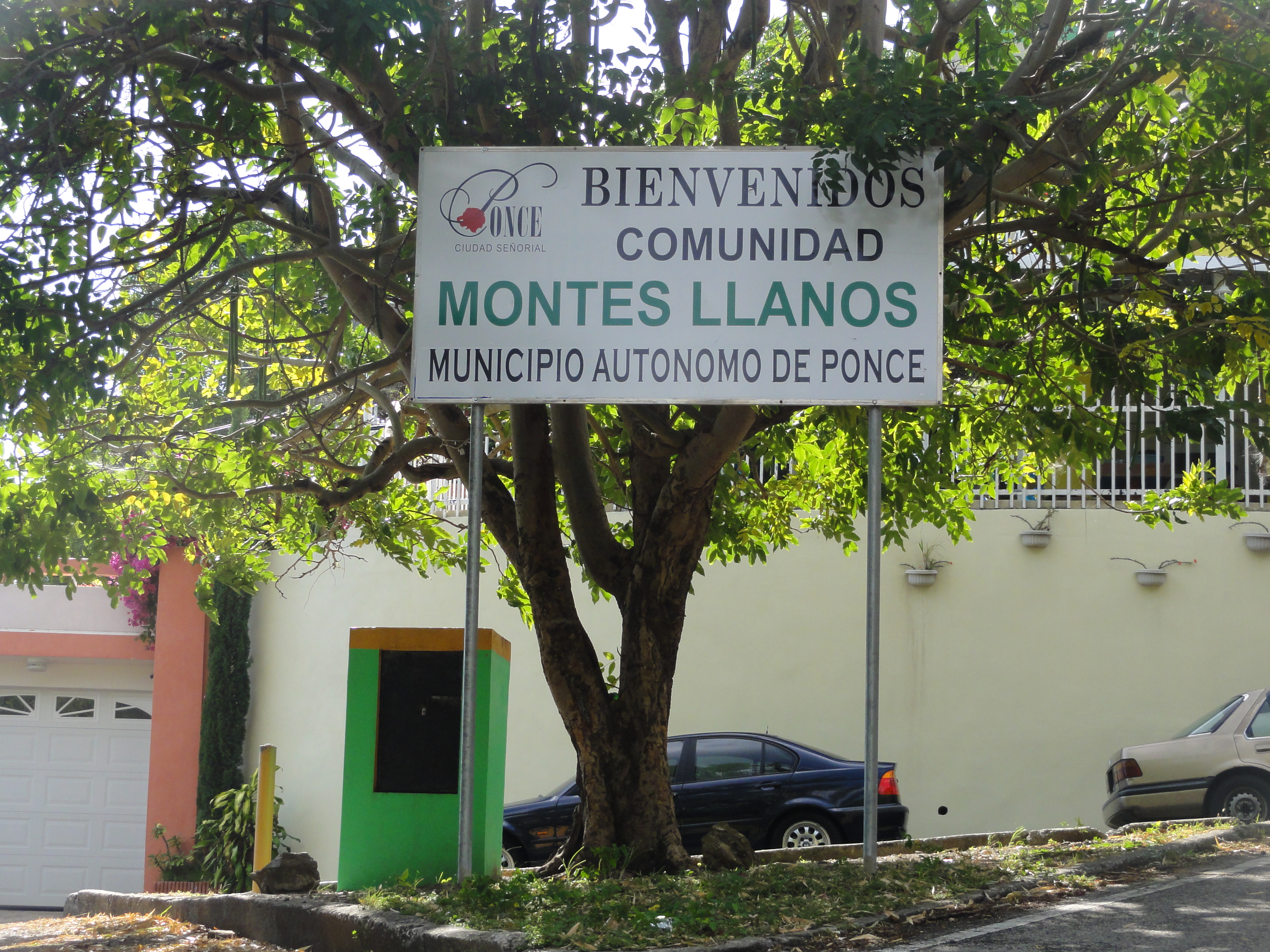
- A sign on PR-505 at PR-504 marking the entrance to Barrio Montes Llanos

- Location of barrio Montes Llanos within the municipality of Ponce shown in red

- Location of Puerto Rico
- Coordinates: 18°05′54″N 66°37′12″W
- Commonwealth: Puerto Rico
- Municipality: Ponce

Area
  - Total: 2.15 sq mi (5.6 km^{2})
  - Land: 2.15 sq mi (5.6 km^{2})
  - Water: 0 sq mi (0 km^{2})
- Elevation: 1,808 ft (551 m)

Population (2010)
  - Total: 523
  - Density: 243.3/sq mi (93.9/km^{2})
- Source: 2010 Census
- Time zone: UTC−4 (AST)

Montes Llanos (also spelled Monte Llano), is one of the 31 barrios in the municipality of Ponce, Puerto Rico. Along with Magueyes, Tibes, Portugués, Maragüez, Machuelo Arriba, and Cerrillos, Montes Llanos is one of the municipality's seven rural interior barrios. It was created in 1898.

== Location ==
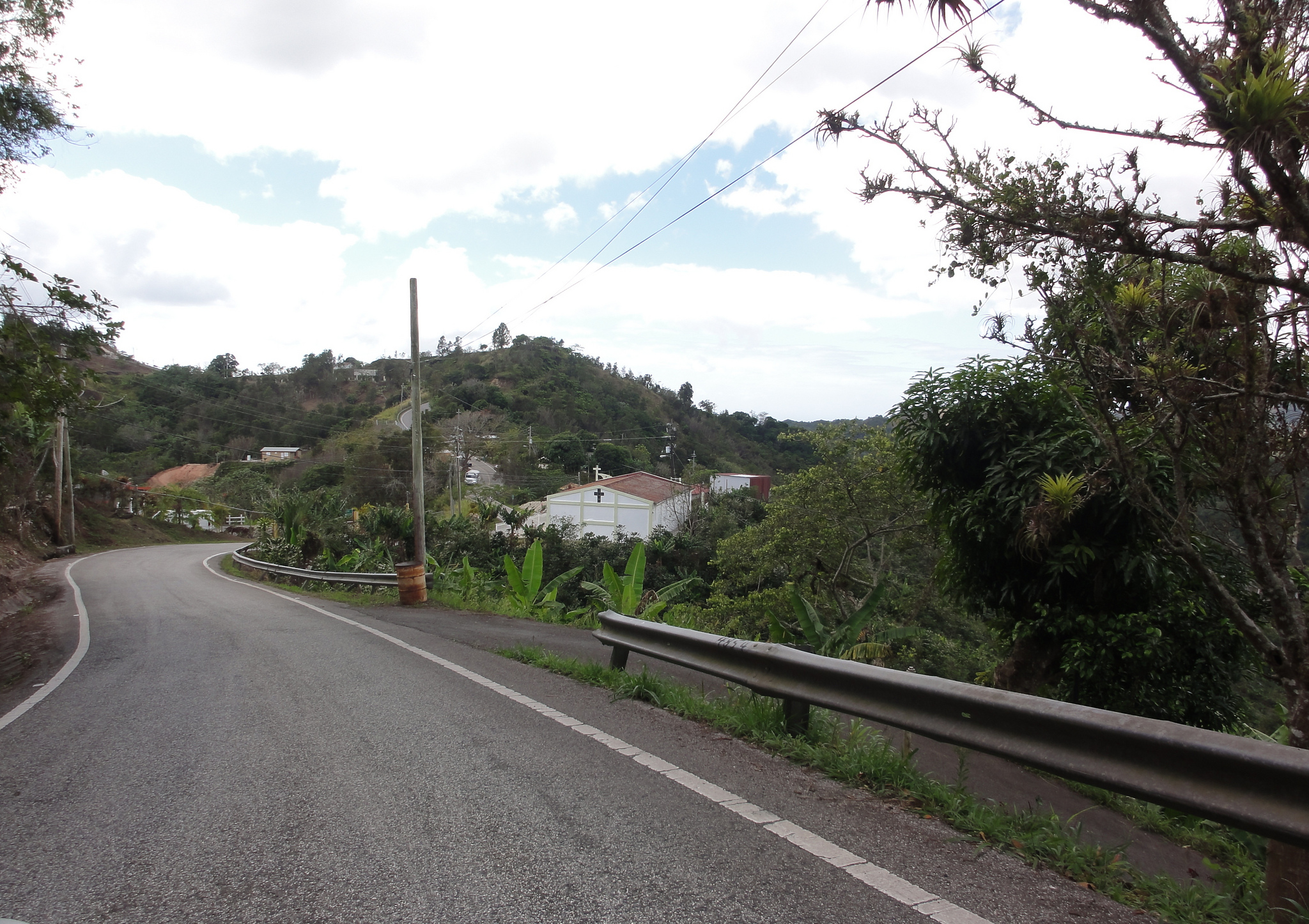
A scene in Barrio Montes Llanos

Montes Llanos is a mountainous rural barrio located in the central portion of the municipality, north of the city of Ponce, at latitude 18.118717 N, and longitude -66.139594 W. The toponymy, or origin of the name, is related to the old "Hato Llano" barrio. The name Montes Llanos relates to the term monte, which in Spanish describes a natural but significant elevation of the surface of the land that is covered with trees, shrubs or other vegetation.

== Boundaries ==
Montes Llanos is bounded on the North by PR-505 (roughly), on the South by the hills north of Pastillo Road and El Cedro I Road, on the West by the hills west of Río Chiquito, and on the East by the hills west of Río Bayagan and PR-505 (roughly).

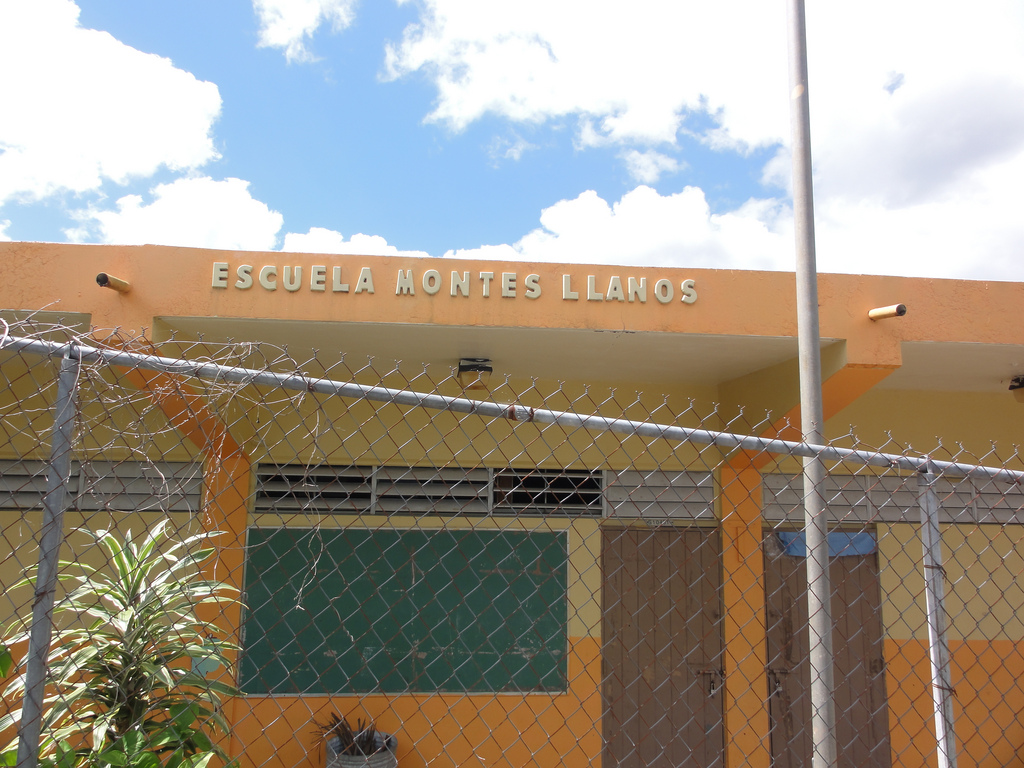
An elementary school on PR-505 in at Km 10.3 in Barrio Montes Llanos

In terms of barrio-to-barrio boundaries, Montes Llanos is bounded in the North by Barrios San Patricio and Maragüez, in the South by Portugués and Machuelo Arriba, in the West by Tibes, and in the East by Barrio Maragüez.

== Demographics ==
Montes Llanos has 2.15 square miles (5.6 km^{2}) of land area and no water area. In 2000, the population of Montes Llanos was 462 persons, and it had a density of 215 persons per square mile, making it the least populated barrio in the municipality. Montes Llanos is the least populated, though not the least densely populated, barrio in the municipality of Ponce. The community of Villas del Monte Verde is located in Montes Llanos.

In 2010, the population of Monte Llano was 523 persons, and it had a density of 243.3 persons per square mile.

Historical population
Census	Pop.	Note	%±
1900	964		—
1910	825		−14.4%
1920	1,241		50.4%
1930	717		−42.2%
1940	1,015		41.6%
1950	487		−52.0%
1960	338		−30.6%
1970	302		−10.7%
1980	391		29.5%
1990	764		95.4%
2000	462		−39.5%
2010	523		13.2%
U.S. Decennial Census; 1899 (shown as 1900) 1910-1930; 1930-1950 1960 1980-2000 2010

== Geography ==
The highest point in barrio Montes Llanos stands at 2,394 feet and is located in the extreme northwest tip of the barrio.

== Infrastructure ==
The main road serving Barrio Montes Llanos is PR-505.

== Notable Landmarks ==
Barrio Montes Llanos is home to the origin of the Río Chiquito. Rio Chiquito feeds into Rio Portugues just as they both enter the Ponce city limits to eventually empty as Rio Bucana into the Caribbean Sea opposite Caja de Muertos.

== See also ==
- List of communities in Puerto Rico
