= Machuelo Arriba =

Barrio of Ponce, Puerto Rico

- Barrio
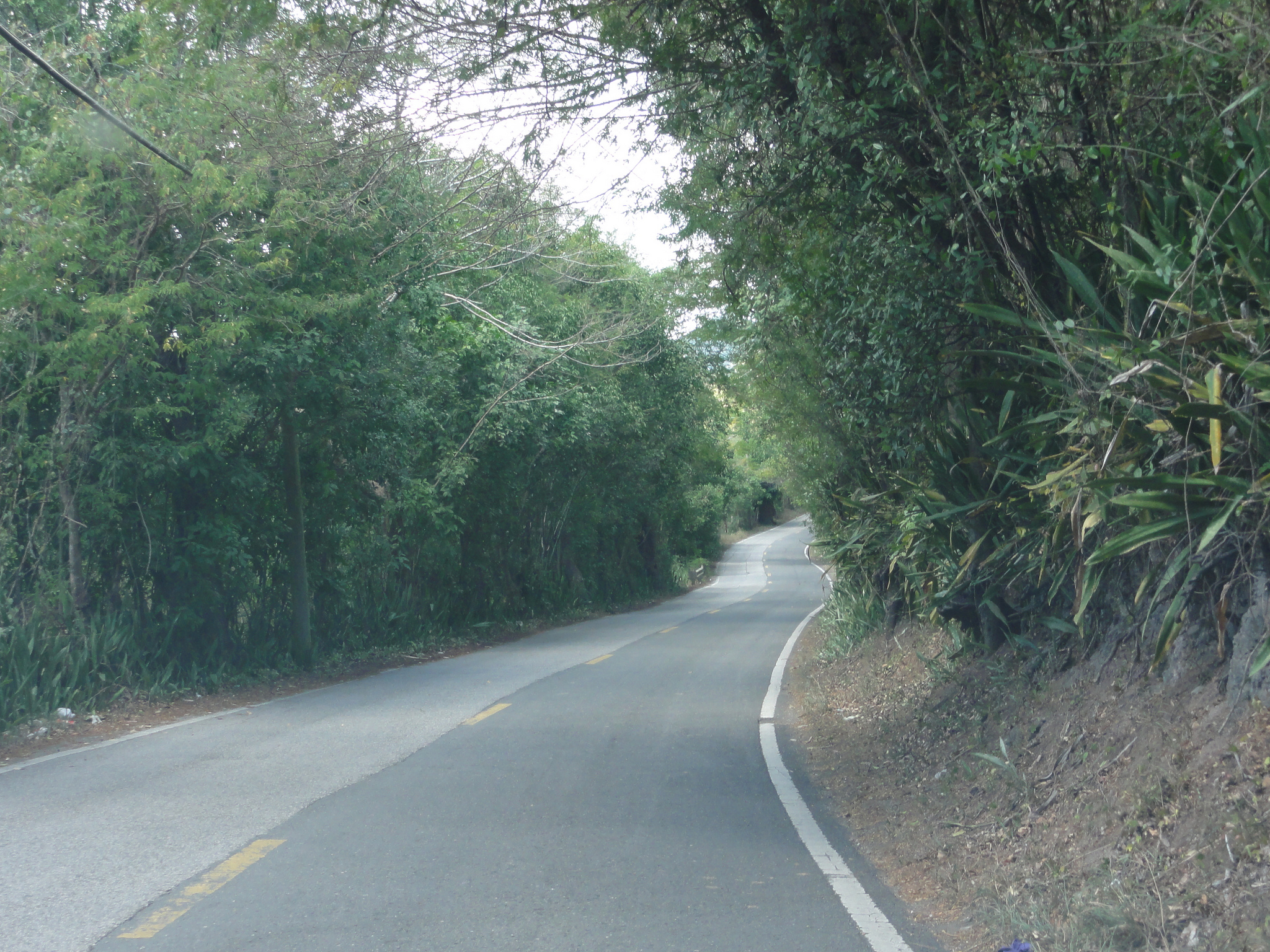
- Northbound PR-139 through Barrio Machuelo Arriba

- Location of barrio Machuelo Arriba within the municipality of Ponce shown in red

- Location of Puerto Rico
- Coordinates: 18°03′17″N 66°35′34″W
- Commonwealth: Puerto Rico
- Municipality: Ponce

Area
  - Total: 6.63 sq mi (17.2 km^{2})
  - Land: 6.62 sq mi (17.1 km^{2})
  - Water: 0.01 sq mi (0.026 km^{2})
- Elevation: 620 ft (190 m)

Population (2010)
  - Total: 12,412
  - Density: 1,897.9/sq mi (732.8/km^{2})
- Source: 2010 Census
- Time zone: UTC−4 (AST)

Machuelo Arriba is one of the 31 barrios of the municipality of Ponce, Puerto Rico. Along with the barrios of Magueyes, Tibes, Portugués, Montes Llanos, Maragüez, and Cerrillos, Machuelo Arriba is one of the municipality's seven rural interior barrios. It was established in 1831.

== Location ==
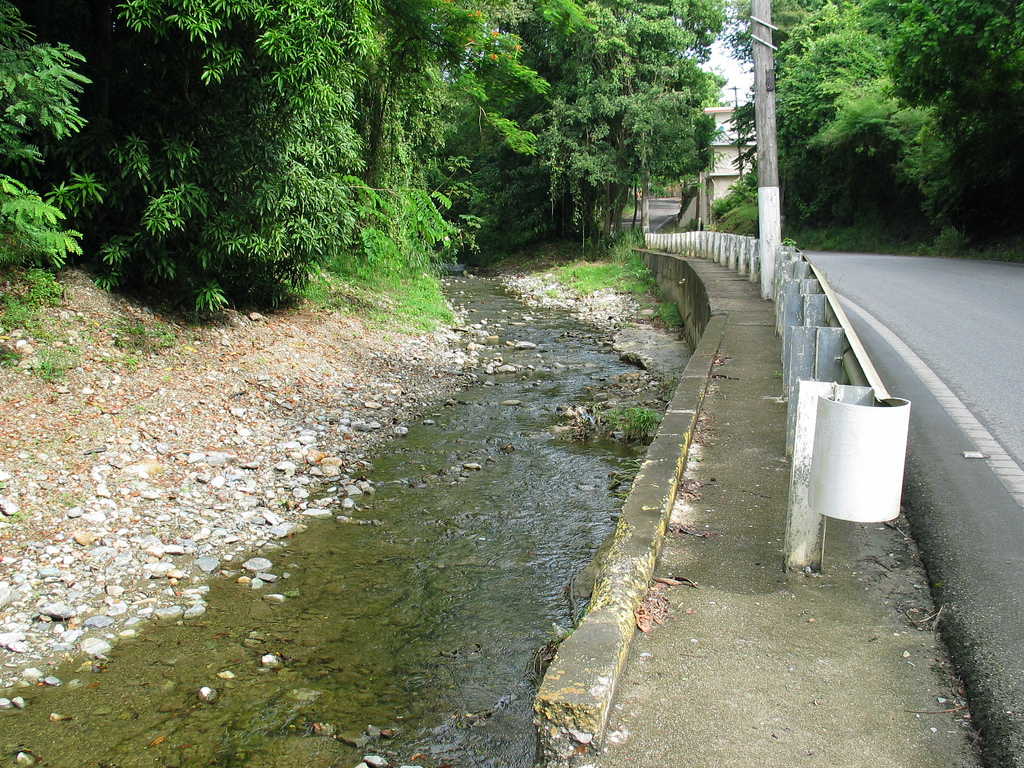
Rio Bayagan (Bayagan River) running alongside Puerto Rico Highway 505 (PR-505) in Barrio Machuelo Arriba, Ponce, Puerto Rico

Machuelo Arriba is a rural barrio located in the central section of the municipality, just north of the Ponce city limits at latitude 18.043976N, and longitude -66.597924W.

== Boundaries ==
It is bounded on the North by the hills north of Camino El Cedro I Road, on the South by Tito Castro Avenue/PR-14 (roughly), on the West by PR-504, by the hills west of PR-505, and Rio Portugues, and on the East by Pinto Peak, and Río Cerrillos.

In terms of barrio-to-barrio boundaries, Machuelo Arriba is bounded on the North by Barrios Maragüez and Monte Llano, on the South by Machuelo Abajo, on the West by Barrios Portugués and Portugués Urbano, and on the East by Maragüez and Cerrillos.

== Features and demographics ==
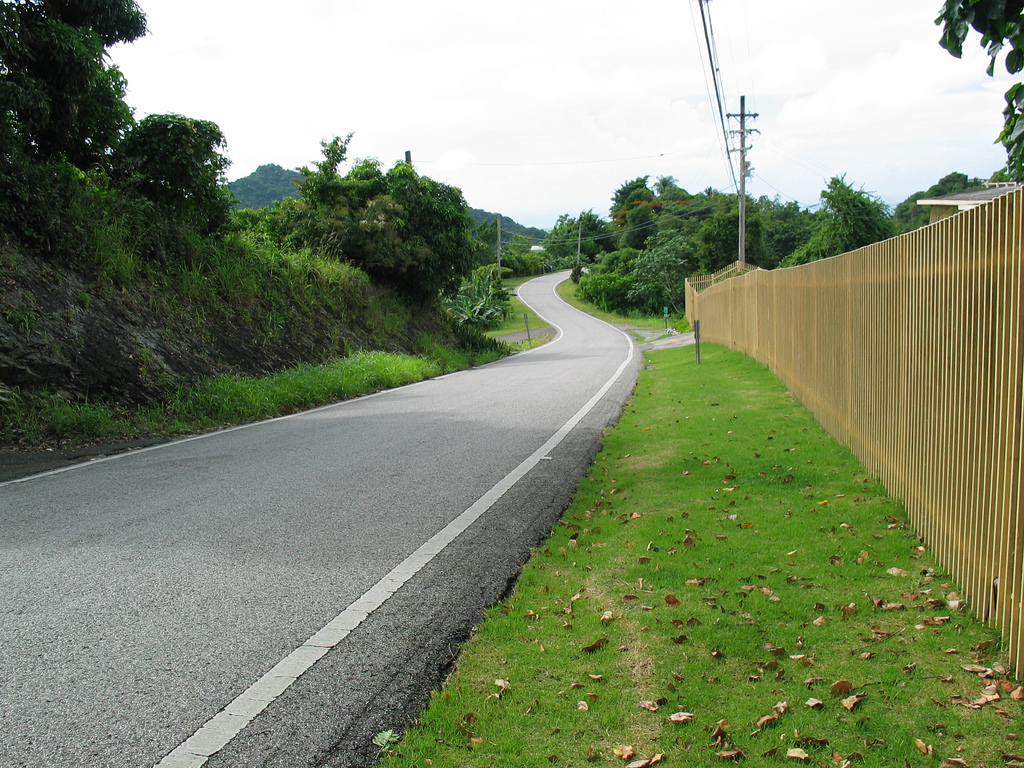
A stretch of Puerto Rico Highway 505 (PR-505) southbound in Barrio Machuelo Arriba, Ponce

The communities of La Cuchilla, La Yuca, El Paraiso, Glenview Gardens, Quintas de Monserrate, Villa Machuelo, and Santa Teresita are found here. The communities of Jardines de Ponce and Las Monjitas are also located within the limits of barrio Machuelo Arriba.

Machuelo Arriba has 6.54 square miles (17 km^{2}) of land area and 0.11 square miles (280,000 m^{2}) of water area. In 2010, the population of Machuelo Arriba was 12,412. The population density in Machuelo Arriba was 1,897.9 persons per square mile.

The main roads in barrio Machuelo Arriba are PR-10 on its southern part, and PR-505 and PR-139 which serve the rest of the barrio.

The highest point in Barrio Machuelo Arriba is Pico Pinto which stands at 2,037 feet.

Historical population
Census	Pop.	Note	%±
1900	1,413		—
1910	1,552		9.8%
1920	1,523		−1.9%
1930	1,574		3.3%
1940	1,407		−10.6%
1950	2,024		43.9%
1960	2,418		19.5%
1970	8,218		239.9%
1980	11,703		42.4%
1990	13,031		11.3%
2000	13,727		5.3%
2010	12,412		−9.6%
U.S. Decennial Census; 1899 (shown as 1900) 1910-1930; 1930-1950 1960 1980-2000 2010

== Landmarks ==
The Río Bucaná springs from Barrio Machuelo Arriba (as Rio Bayagan) and runs for 29.5 kilometers (18.3 mi) into the Caribbean Sea.

== See also ==
- List of communities in Puerto Rico
