= Anón River =

River of Puerto Rico

Río Anón
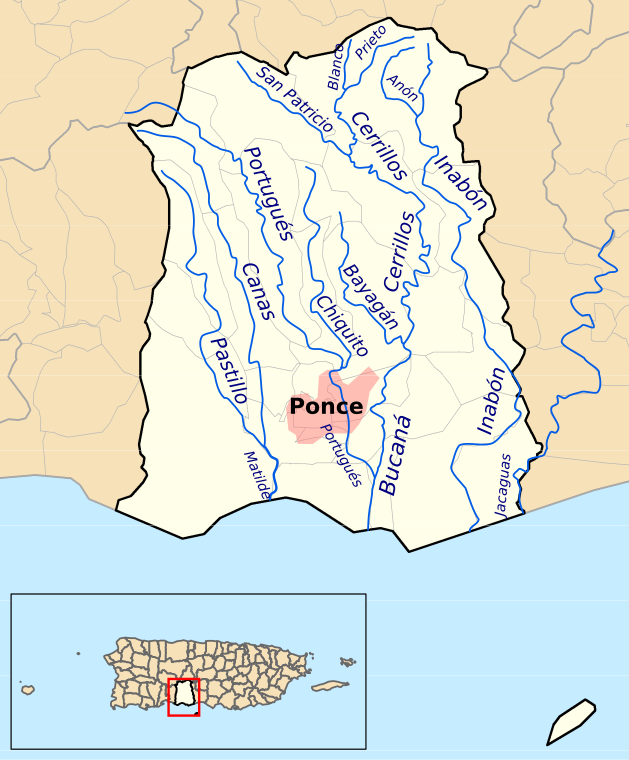
- Map showing the location of Río Anón among the other rivers in the municipality. The area in pink represents the urban zone of the city

Location
- Commonwealth: Puerto Rico
- Municipality: Ponce

Physical characteristics
- Source
  - location: Barrio Anón, Ponce, Puerto Rico
  - coordinates: 18.1319046°N 66.5798949°W
  - elevation: 3,854 feet (1,175 m)
- Mouth
  - location: Inabón River, barrio Anón, Ponce, Puerto Rico
  - elevation: 1,060 feet (320 m)
- Length: 4 kilometers (2.5 mi)

Basin features
- River system: Inabón River

Anón River (Spanish: Río Anón) is a river in the municipality of Ponce, Puerto Rico, located in the northeastern area of the municipality. The Anón is one of the 14 rivers in the municipality and, at 1,060 feet (320 m) at its confluence with the Inabón River, it is also the third with the highest mouth location, after Prieto and Blanco Rivers, both of which have their mouths at 1,381 feet (421 m). It has a length of approximately 4 kilometers (2.5 mi) and generally runs south. It has both its origin and its mouth in barrio Anón, which is named after the river.

== Origin and course ==
The river originates in the southern slope of Monte Jayuya, one of the mountains of the Toro Negro State Forest. It then feeds into the Inabón River just south of the intersection of PR-511 and Camino Jurutungo in central barrio Anón.

The following table summarizes the course of Rio Anón in terms of roads crossed. Roads are listed as the river flows from its origin in the mountains of Barrio Anón, north of the city of Ponce, to its feeding into Rio Inabón (N/A = Data not available):

No.	Barrio	Road	Road's km marker	NBI ID	Bridge name (if any)	Direction (of bridge traffic)	Coordinates	Notes
1	Anón	PR-511R	N/A	N/A	Unnamed	Both	18°8′25.008″N 66°35′18.708″W	0.1 km East of PR-511, km 14.5, on PR-511R (0.1 km S of Camino El Monte)
2	Anón	Camino Comunidad Los Chinos	not marked	N/A	Unnamed	Both	18°8′11.796″N 66°34′56.316″W	0.1 km East of PR-511, km 13.2, on Camino Comunidad Los Chinos
3	Anón	Camino Jurutungo	not marked	N/A	Unnamed	Both	18°8′0.2034″N 66°34′47.244″W	0.1 km East of PR-511, km 12.7, on Camino Jurutungo
4	Anón	Unnamed	not marked	23401	Unnamed	Both	18°7′55.8114″N 66°34′47.244″W	0.1 km East of PR-511, km 12.5, on Unnamed Road [Note: confluence with the Inabón River]

== See also ==
- List of rivers of Puerto Rico
- List of rivers of Ponce
