= List of rivers of Ponce, Puerto Rico =

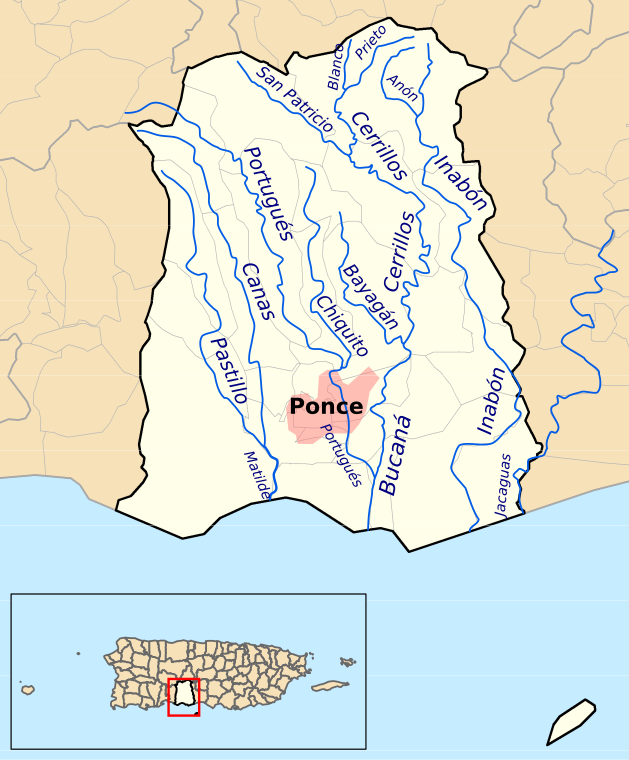
Map of the 14 rivers of Ponce set against a sketch of the barrios of the municipality. The area in pink represents the urban zone of the city

This list of rivers of Ponce consists of the 14 rivers in the municipality of Ponce, Puerto Rico. Rivers that either originate in the municipality or that run the bulk of their course through said municipality are listed. Except for two rivers, Río Portugués and Río Jacaguas, all other rivers originate and terminate within the boundaries of the municipality of Ponce. This list does not include quebradas (English: brooks). Only streams recognized as "rivers" by the United States Geological Survey and the Puerto Rico Department of Natural and Environmental Resources are included here.

All the rivers in the municipality of Ponce run into one of four river basins that then empty into the Caribbean Sea. These four river basins are: Río Matilde, Río Bucaná, Río Inabón, and Río Jacaguas.

Río Pastillo and Río Canas merge to form Río Matilde. Río Blanco, Río Prieto, Río San Patricio, Río Bayagán, Río Cerrillos, Río Chiquito, and Río Portugués all run in one manner or other into Río Bucaná. Río Anon feeds into Río Inabón (Río Guayo also feeds into Río Inabón, but Río Guayo is not located in the municipality of Ponce). Río Jacaguas is actually shared between the municipalities of Ponce and Juana Díaz, as it forms the boundary between the two municipalities. Various rivers feed into Río Jacaguas, but none of them are located within the municipality of Ponce.

Two rivers, Río Bucaná and Río Portugués, are partially canalized. These canalization occur in parts of the urban area of the city of Ponce. Additionally, two rivers have been dammed: Río Cerrillos was dammed to create the Cerrillos Lake, and the damming of Río Portugués is expected to create the Portugués Lake when the project is completed in 2013. The damming of Río Cerrillos occurred north of the point where Río Bayagán feeds into Río Cerrillos but south of where Río San Patricio feeds into Río Cerrillos.

== River list summary table ==
No.	Name	Elevation at Origin (feet)	Elevation at Mouth (feet)	River Length (km)	Watershed Area (sq mi) (0= Not Applicable [*])	Discharge (cu ft/s) (0= Not Available)	Approximate Distance from Mouth to Shore(km)	Photo
1	Río Anón	3,854	1,060	4.0	0	0	12.0	
2	Río Bayagán	141	42	9.0	0	0	4.0	
3	Río Blanco	2,970	1,381	2.0	0	0	16.0	
4	Río Bucaná	115	0	9.16	28.45	0	0	
5	Río Canas	930	15	14.0	0	0	1.7	
6	Río Cerrillos	1,200	69	29.8	17.80	24,000	5.0	
7	Río Chiquito	1,170	98	9.5	0	0	3.0	
8	Río Inabón	4,100	0	32.01	38.18	15,000	0	
9	Río Jacaguas	2,099	0	39.72	59.85	37,000	0	
10	Río Matilde	15	0	1.7	0	0	0	
11	Río Pastillo	435	15	19.0	0	0	1.7	
12	Río Portugués	2,853	3	29.66	20.33	16,000	2.0	
13	Río Prieto	3,920	1,381	4.0	0	0	14.0	
14	Río San Patricio	1,917	660	6.3	0	0	7.0	

[*] = When the watershed area for a river appears as "Not Applicable", the river is itself part of another river's watershed area.

== Listed alphabetically ==
- Río Anón
- Río Bayagán
- Río Blanco
- Río Bucaná
- Río Canas
- Río Cerrillos
- Río Chiquito
- Río Inabón
- Río Jacaguas
- Río Matilde
- Río Pastillo
- Río Portugués
- Río Prieto
- Río San Patricio

== Listed from west to east ==
Listed according to the latitude at the mouth of the river:

- Río Pastillo - at 66.6404508 W
- Río Canas - at 66.6404508 W
- Río Chiquito - at 66.6135062 W
- Río Blanco - at 66.6079505 W
- Río Prieto - at 66.6079505 W
- Río San Patricio - at 66.6068395 W
- Río Bucaná - at 66.5998946 W
- Río Bayagán - at 66.5857282 W
- Río Matilde - at 66.5798949 W
- Río Portugués - at 66.5798949 W
- Río Anón - at 66.5798949 W
- Río Cerrillos - at 66.5798949 W
- Río Inabón - at 66.5582270 W
- Río Jacaguas - at 66.5393380 W

== Listed from south to north ==
This lists the rivers in order of their longitude or, roughly, where the river's mouth is relative to the Ponce shore:

=== 0 km from shore (mouth at Caribbean Sea) ===
- Río Matilde
- Río Bucaná
- Río Inabón
- Río Jacaguas

=== Up to 1 km from shore ===
- Río Pastillo - at 18.0019106 N
- Río Canas - at 18.0019106 N
- Río Chiquito - at 18.0330201 N
- Río Bayagán - at 18.0435751 N

=== Up to 2 km from shore ===
- Río San Patricio - at 18.1177384 N
- Río Portugués - at 18.1319046 N
- Río Anón - at 18.1319046 N
- Río Cerrillos - at 18.1319046 N

=== Up to 3 km from shore ===
- Río Blanco - at 18.1438485 N
- Río Prieto - at 18.1438485 N

== See also ==
- List of rivers of Puerto Rico
