= Puerto Rico Highway 139 =

Highway in Puerto Rico

Highway 139
- Ruta 139

Route information
- Maintained by Puerto Rico DTPW
- Length: 25.2 km (15.7 mi)

Major junctions
- South end: PR-10 / PR-14 in Machuelo Arriba
- PR-505 in Machuelo Arriba; PR-139R / PR-5139 in Machuelo Arriba
- North end: PR-143 in Anón–Jauca

Location
- Country: United States
- Territory: Puerto Rico
- Municipalities: Ponce

Highway system
- Roads in Puerto Rico; List
← PR-138	→ PR-140
← PR-125R	PR-139R	→ PR-149R
← PR-4413	PR-5139	→ PR-5141

Puerto Rico Highway 139 (PR-139) is a two-way secondary highway in the municipality of Ponce in Puerto Rico. With a length of 25.2 km (15.7 mi), it extends from the interchange of PR-10 and PR-14 located in Barrio Machuelo Arriba to the junction with PR-143 on the Ponce–Jayuya municipal limit.

== Route description ==
The road runs south to north through Barrio Machuelo Arriba, where it serves as the main access to several communities and neighborhood developments before leaving the city of Ponce to the mountains. Then, the road makes its way through the rural area, mostly alongside Río Cerrillos in barrio Maragüez, bordering the western bank of Lake Cerrillos until it reaches upstream of the reservoir, where it crosses the river and makes its way along its eastern bank. Farther north, PR-139 climbs the mountains of the Cordillera Central through Barrio Anón until its terminus at the Ruta Panorámica.

Puerto Rico Highway 139

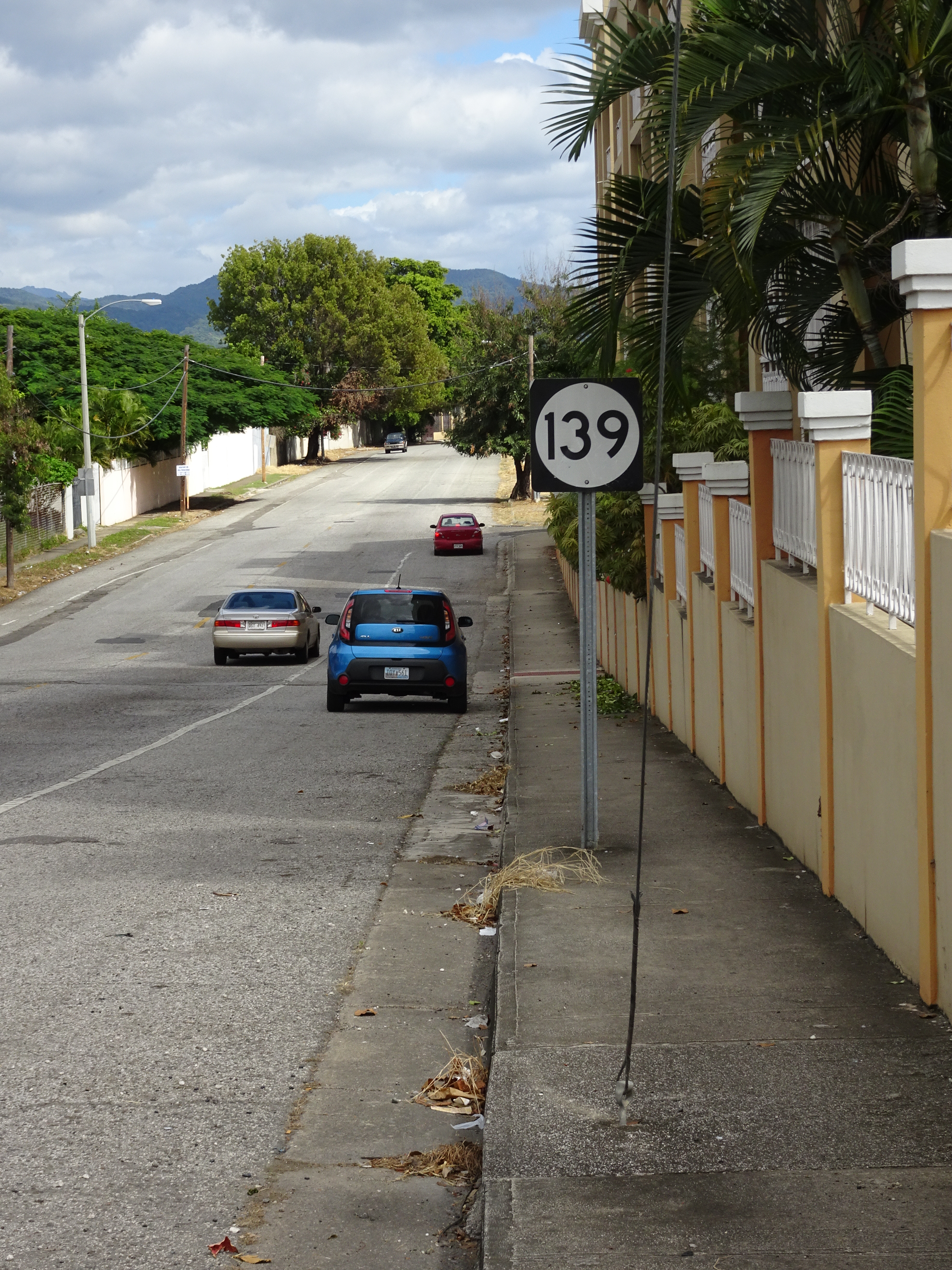
Northbound sign, a few yards from the start of the route in Ponce, Puerto Rico, looking northeast

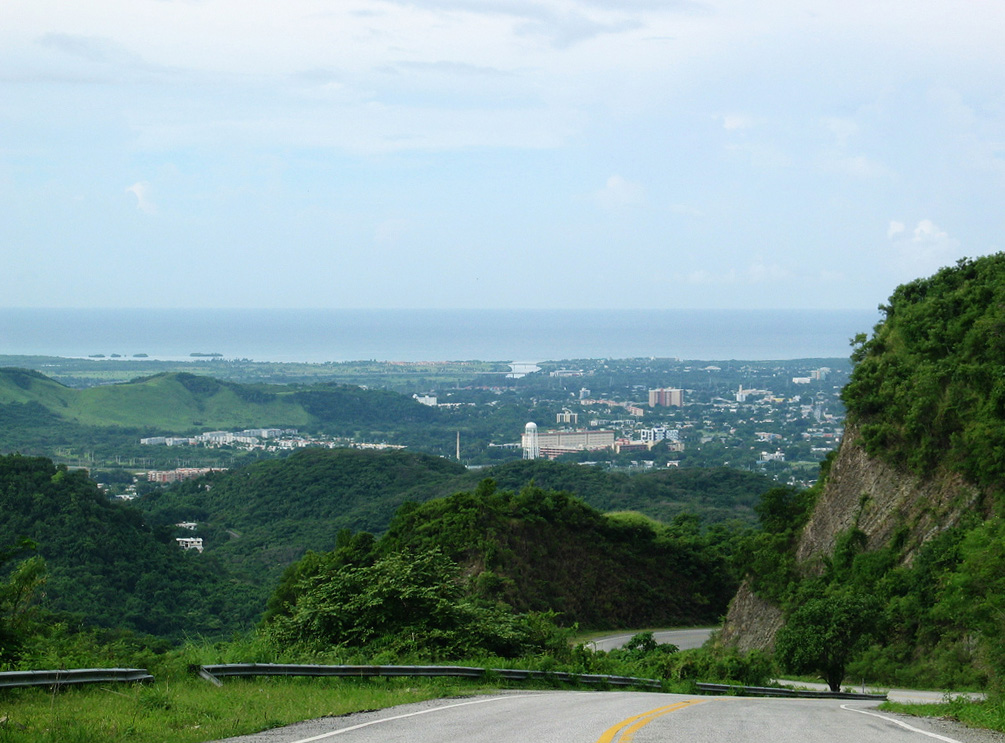
Heading south in Barrio Maragüez, Ponce, with the city of Ponce and the Río Portugués channel in the background and the Caribbean Sea in the far background

=== Communities served ===
As the road is traveled in a northbound fashion, it serves barrios Machuelo Arriba, Maragüez, and Anón. In Machuelo Arriba, PR-139 meets with PR-505, PR-139R, PR-5139, and the Río Bayagán; in Maragüez, it crosses through Cerrillos State Forest, and in Anón, it meets with Río Prieto and Río Blanco, two tributaries of the Río Cerrillos.

== History ==
The entire length of PR-139 is part of the old Road No. 51, a highway that led from Ponce to Jayuya until the 1953 Puerto Rico highway renumbering, a process implemented by the Puerto Rico Department of Transportation and Public Works (Spanish: Departamento de Transportación y Obras Públicas) that increased the insular highway network to connect existing routes with different locations around Puerto Rico. Route 51 extended from PR-14 (old Road No. 1) between barrios Machuelo Abajo and Machuelo Arriba to the intersection of PR-143 with PR-140 (former Road No. 15) on the Ponce–Jayuya–Utuado municipal tripoint. Its original way currently corresponds to PR-139 and PR-143, the latter from PR-139 in the east to PR-140 in the west. PR-139R also belongs to an original segment of the old Road No. 51. The other part of the highway disappeared after the creation of Cerrillos Dam.

== Major intersections ==
Municipality	Location	km	mi	Destinations	Notes
Ponce	Machuelo Arriba	0.0	0.0	PR-10 (Carretera Salvador "Chiry" Vassallo Ruiz) / PR-14 (Avenida Tito Castro) – Ponce, Juana Díaz, Adjuntas	Southern terminus of PR-139; diamond interchange
Ponce	Machuelo Arriba	0.3– 0.4	0.19– 0.25	PR-505 north (Carretera La Guardarraya) – Adjuntas, Jayuya	
Ponce	Machuelo Arriba	3.2	2.0	PR-139R / PR-5139 – Ponce	
Ponce–Jayuya municipal line	Anón–Jauca line	25.2	15.7	PR-143 (Ruta Panorámica) – Adjuntas, Barranquitas	Northern terminus of PR-139
1.000 mi = 1.609 km; 1.000 km = 0.621 mi

== Related routes ==
Currently, Puerto Rico Highway 139 has two branches along its route in Ponce.

=== Puerto Rico Highway 139R ===
Highway 139R
- Location: Ponce
- Length: 2.9 km (1.8 mi)

Puerto Rico Highway 139R (Spanish: Carretera Ramal 139, abbreviated Ramal PR-139 or PR-139R) is a spur route or ramal from its parent route PR-139 between barrios Machuelo Arriba and Maragüez. With a length of 2.9 km (1.8 mi), is the main (and only) access to Cerrillos Dam and Luis A. "Wito" Morales Park. The entire route is located in Ponce.

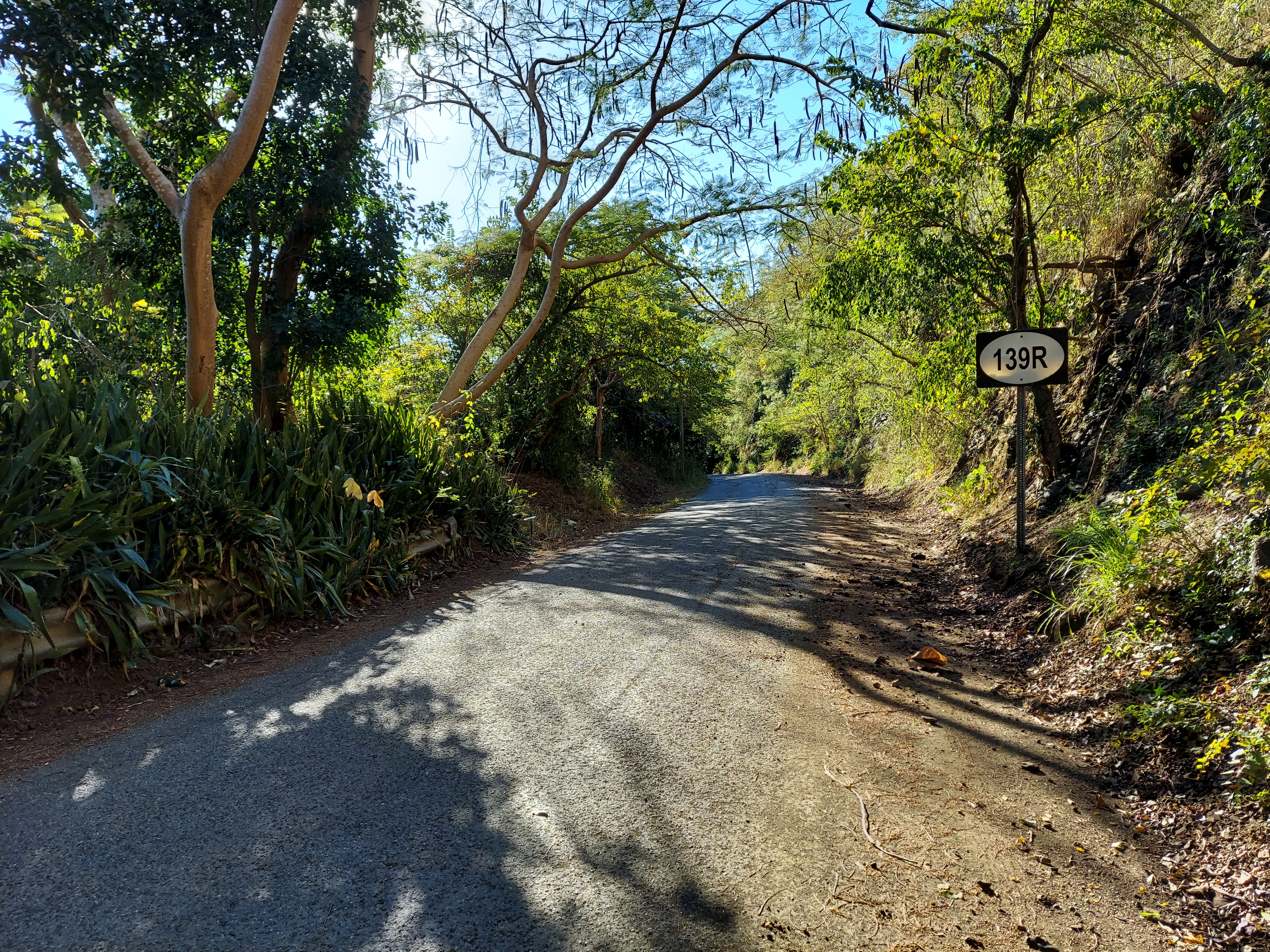
PR-139R south in Barrio Machuelo Arriba

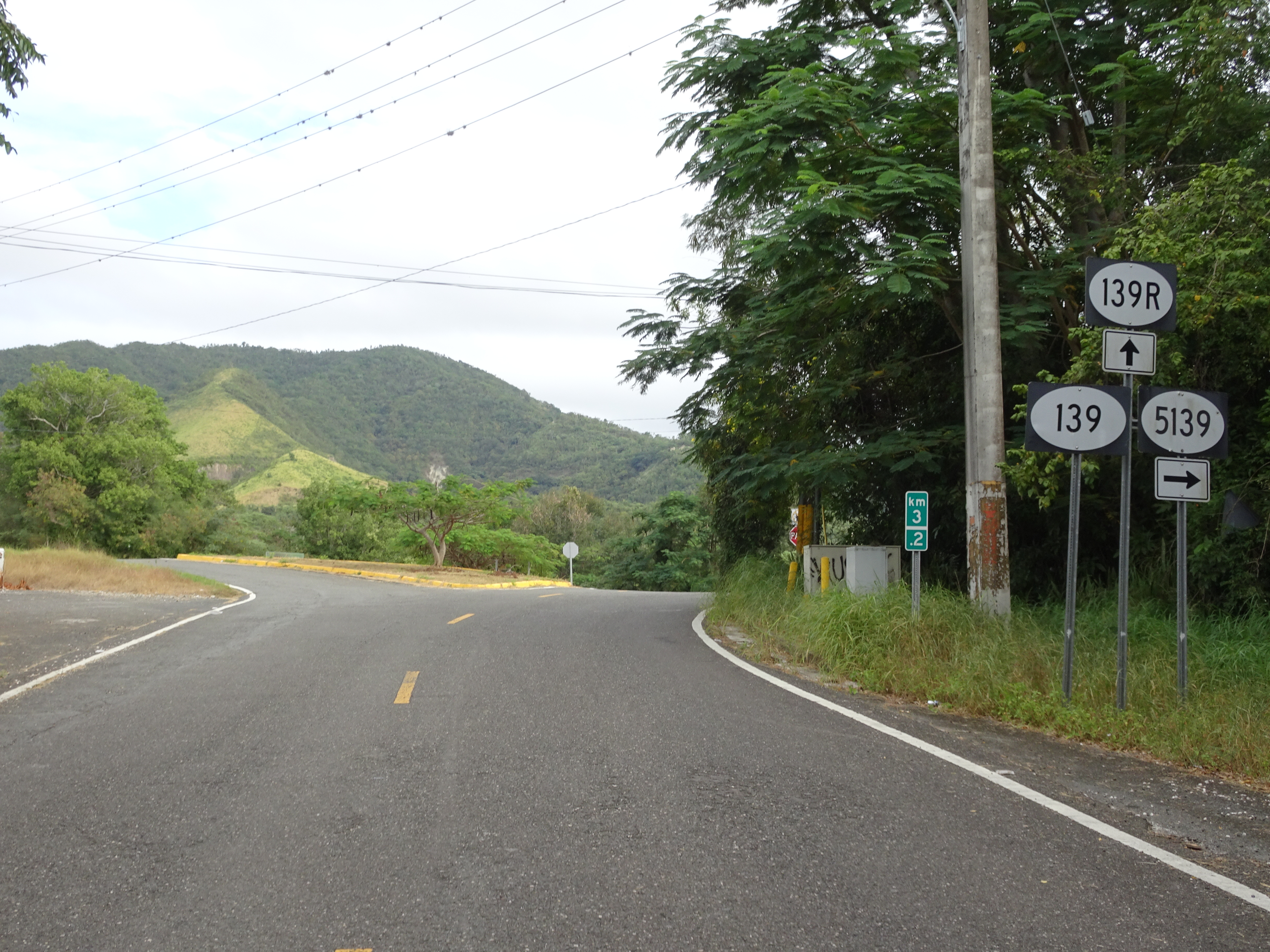
PR-139 north at PR-139R and PR-5139 intersection in Barrio Machuelo Arriba

Location	km	mi	Destinations	Notes
Machuelo Arriba	0.0	0.0	PR-139 / PR-5139 – Ponce, Jayuya	Southern terminus of PR-139R
Maragüez	2.9	1.8	Luis A. "Wito" Morales Park – Cerrillos Dam	Northern terminus of PR-139R; dead end road
1.000 mi = 1.609 km; 1.000 km = 0.621 mi

=== Puerto Rico Highway 5139 ===
Highway 5139
- Location: Ponce
- Length: 2.8 km (1.7 mi)

Puerto Rico Highway 5139 (PR-5139) is a north–south connector located between PR-14 and PR-139. With a length of 2.8 km (1.7 mi), this road runs through barrios Cerrillos and Machuelo Arriba, crossing the Río Cerrillos near Cerrillos Dam. The entire route is located in Ponce.

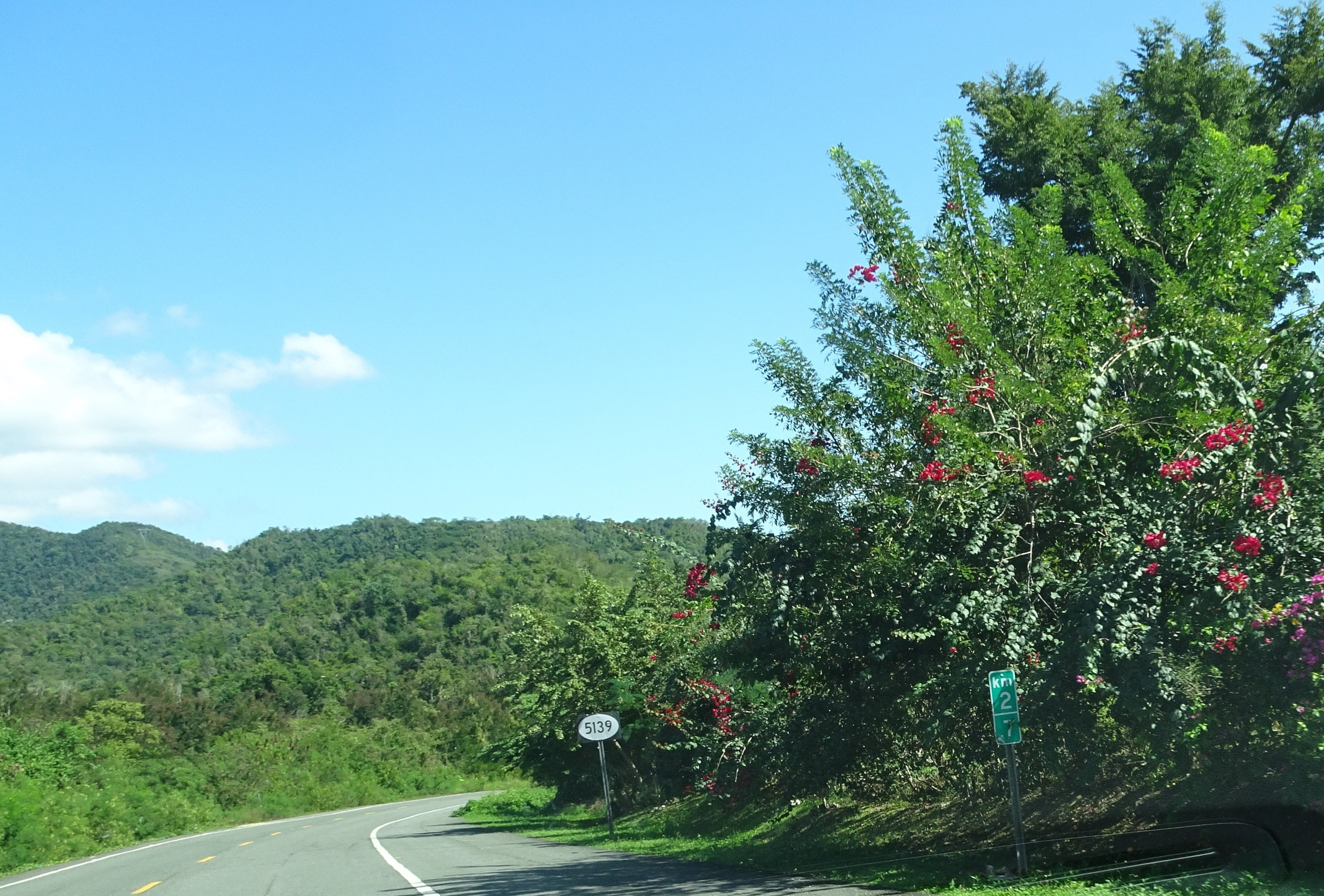
PR-5139 south in Barrio Machuelo Arriba

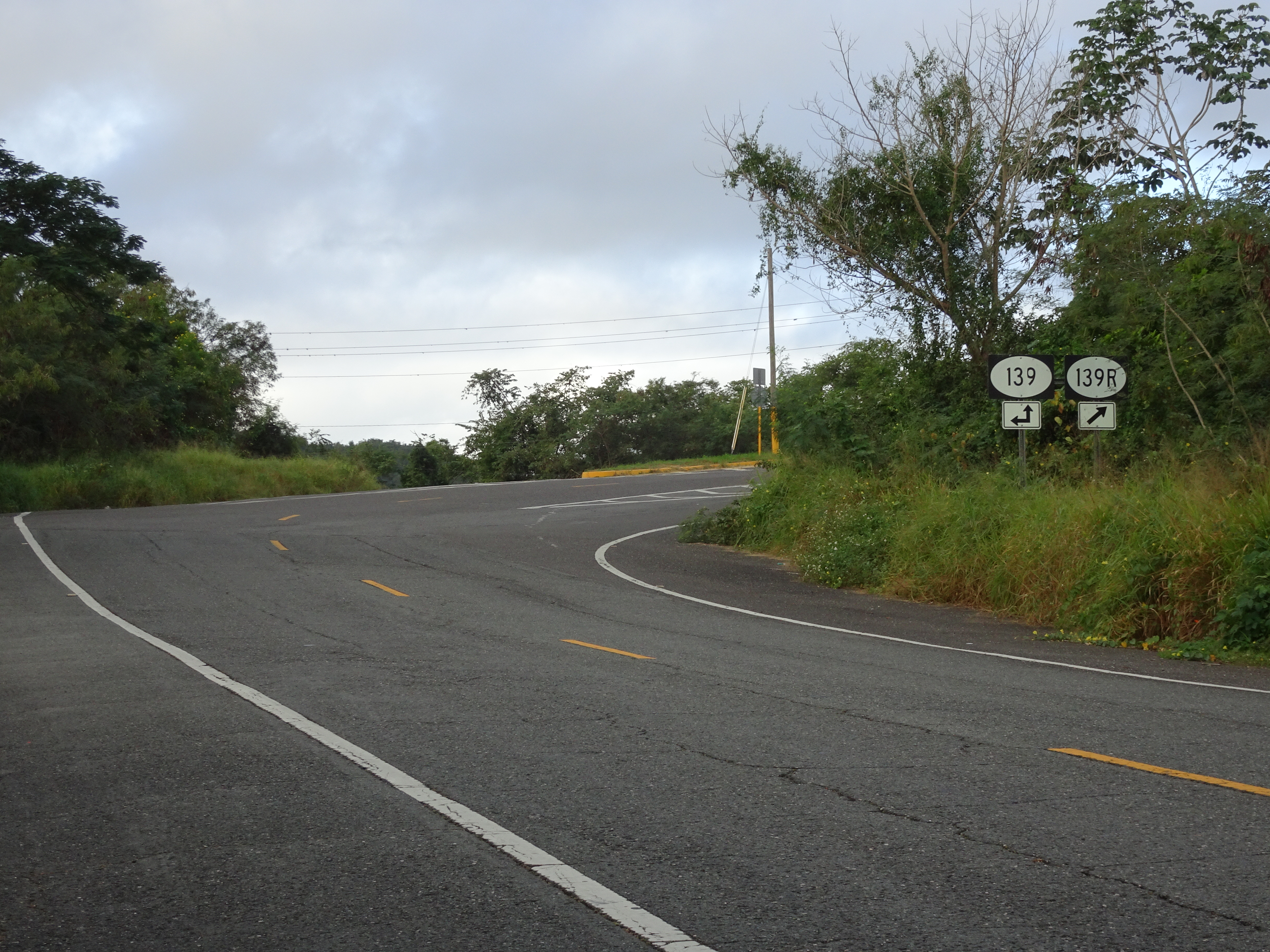
PR-5139 north at PR-139 and PR-139R intersection in Barrio Machuelo Arriba

Location	km	mi	Destinations	Notes
Cerrillos	0.0	0.0	PR-14 (Carretera Central) – Ponce, Juana Díaz	Southern terminus of PR-5139
Machuelo Arriba	2.8	1.7	PR-139 / PR-139R – Ponce, Jayuya	Northern terminus of PR-5139
1.000 mi = 1.609 km; 1.000 km = 0.621 mi

== See also ==
- List of highways in Ponce, Puerto Rico
