= Puerto Rico Highway 511 =

Highway in Puerto Rico

Highway 511
- Ruta 511

Route information
- Maintained by Puerto Rico DTPW
- Length: 18.9 km (11.7 mi)

Major junctions
- South end: PR-14 in Coto Laurel–Real
- North end: PR-143 in Anón–Jauca

Location
- Country: United States
- Territory: Puerto Rico
- Municipalities: Ponce

Highway system
- Roads in Puerto Rico; List
← PR-510	→ PR-515

Puerto Rico Highway 511 (PR-511) is a tertiary state highway in the municipality of Ponce in Puerto Rico. With a length of 16.4 km (10.2 mi), it extends from PR-14 between barrios Coto Laurel and Real to PR-143 between Ponce and Jayuya.

== Route description ==
The road runs south to north, connecting PR-14 at its southern terminus on the Coto Laurel–Real line to PR-143 at its northern terminus on the Ponce–Jayuya municipal limit. It runs mostly along the Inabón River in the road's southern portions through Barrio Real and along the Anón River in its northern portion, once the road enters Barrio Anón. The road is 16.4 kilometers (10.2 mi) long.

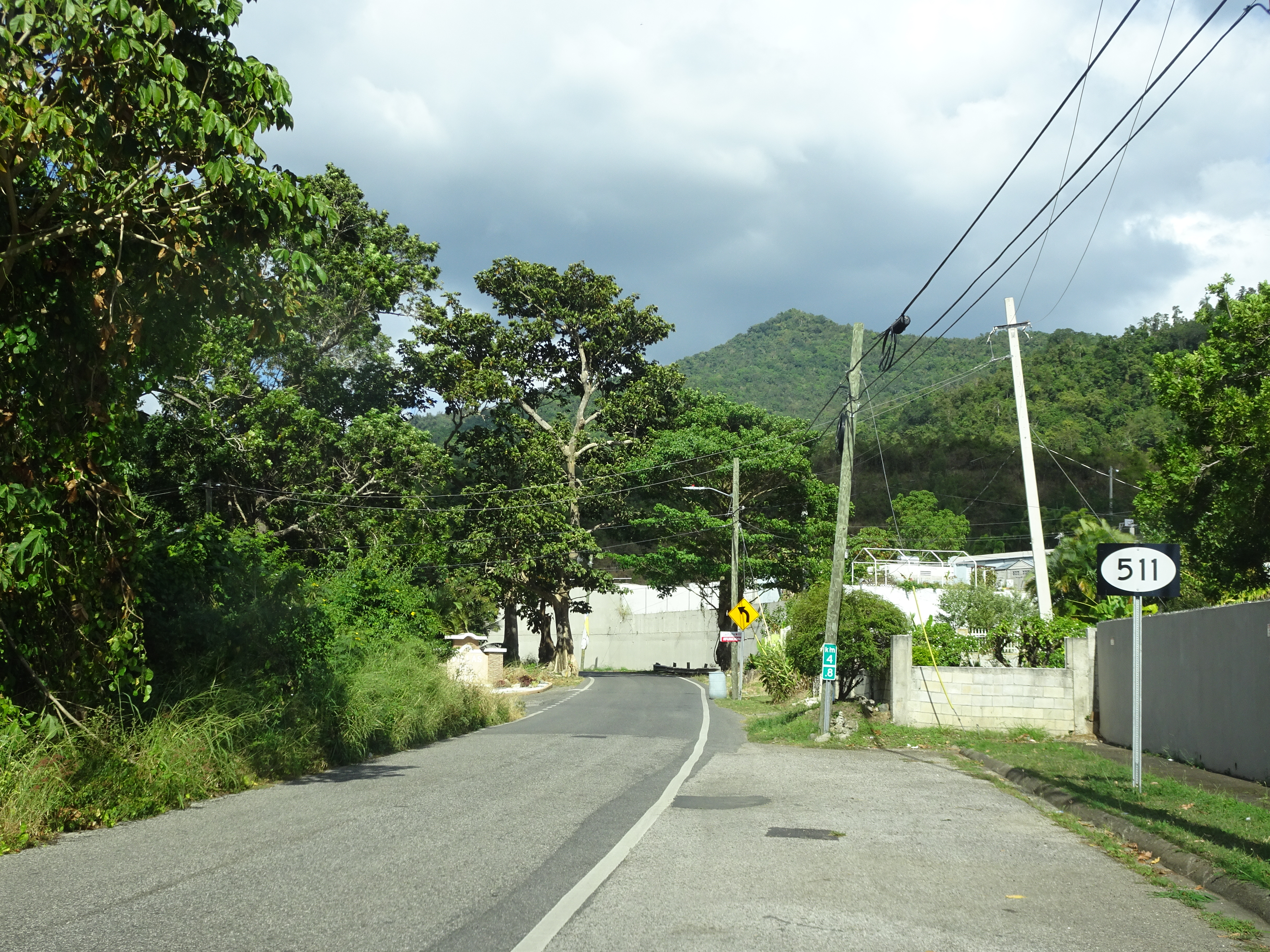
A stretch of PR-511 northbound in Barrio Real, Ponce, Puerto Rico

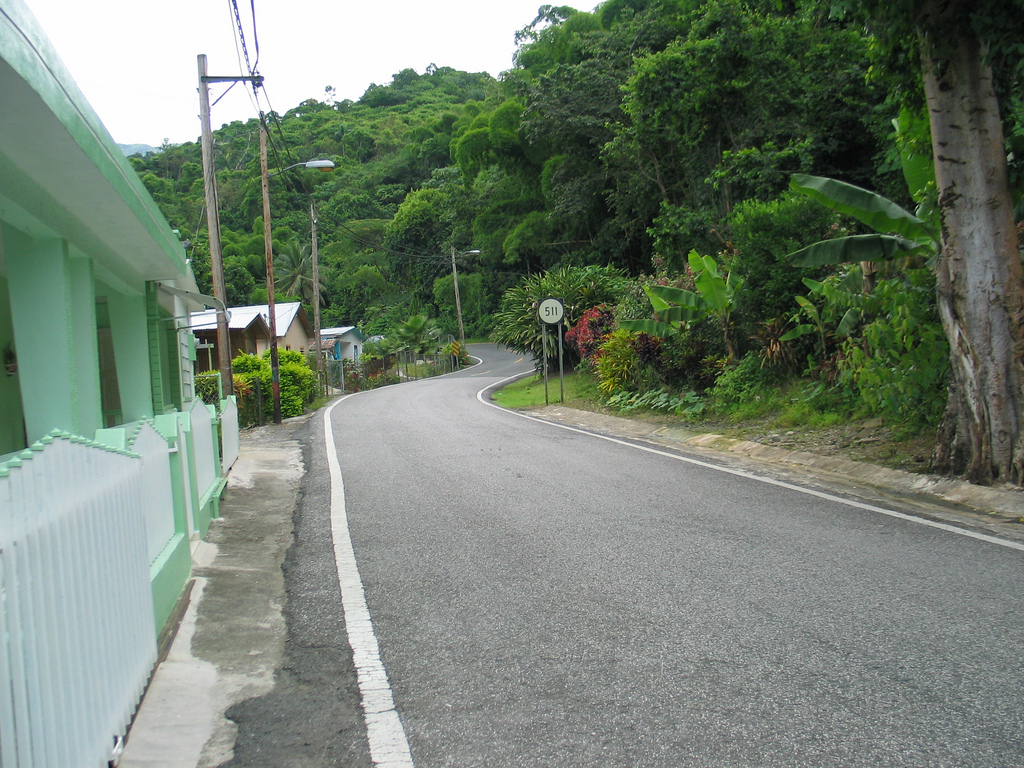
A stretch of PR-511 in the hills of Barrio Real, looking north

=== Improvements ===
Puerto Rico Legislature Joint Resolution 795 of 5 July 2010, which sought to order the Oficina de Gerencia y Presupuesto the assignment of $4.2 million to the Puerto Rico Highways and Transportation Authority (Spanish: Autoridad de Carreteras y Transportación) to make improvements to the road, was not approved.

On 30 March 2011, Puerto Rico Senator Larry Seilhamer Rodríguez, presented Senate Joint Resolution 774 to order the Puerto Rico Highway and Transportation Authority to rebuild PR-511 at km 11.5 (in the Real Anón sector) where the road had been severely damaged in 2005 due to heavy rains.

In October 2013, the residents of Barrio Anón collected money to make the improvements themselves but their efforts were halted after learning they could be the subjects of lawsuits.

== History ==
Prior to its numerical designation, PR-511 was only known as Carretera Real-Anón. In 1930, 2.1 km (1.3 mi) of this road were built by Lorenzo J. Dávila, the contractor for the job, at a cost of $18,755. The current numerical designation corresponds to the 1953 Puerto Rico highway renumbering, a process implemented by the Puerto Rico Department of Transportation and Public Works (Spanish: Departamento de Transportación y Obras Públicas) that increased the insular highway network to connect existing routes with different locations around Puerto Rico.

== Major intersections ==
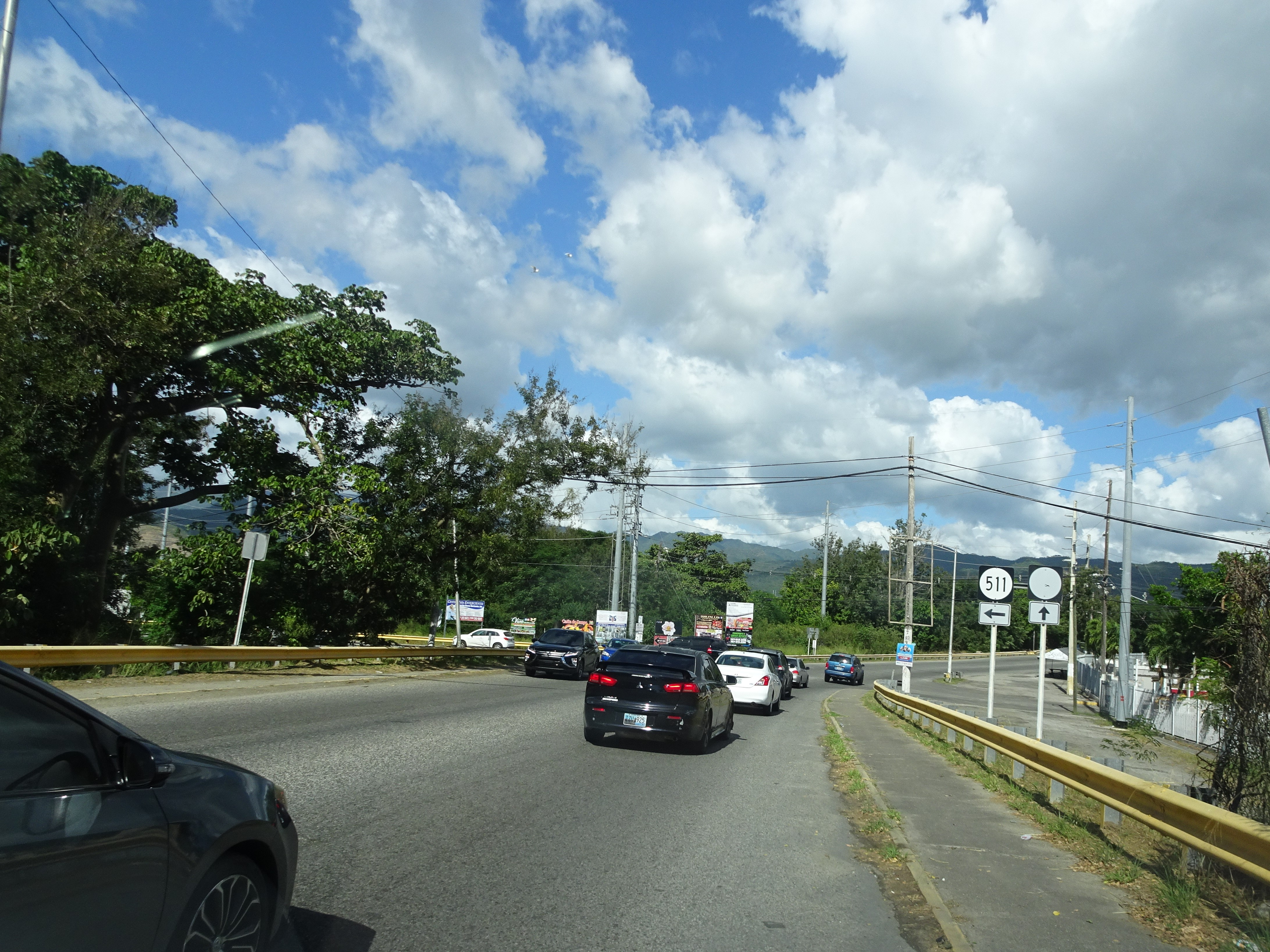
PR-14 east at the southern terminus of PR-511

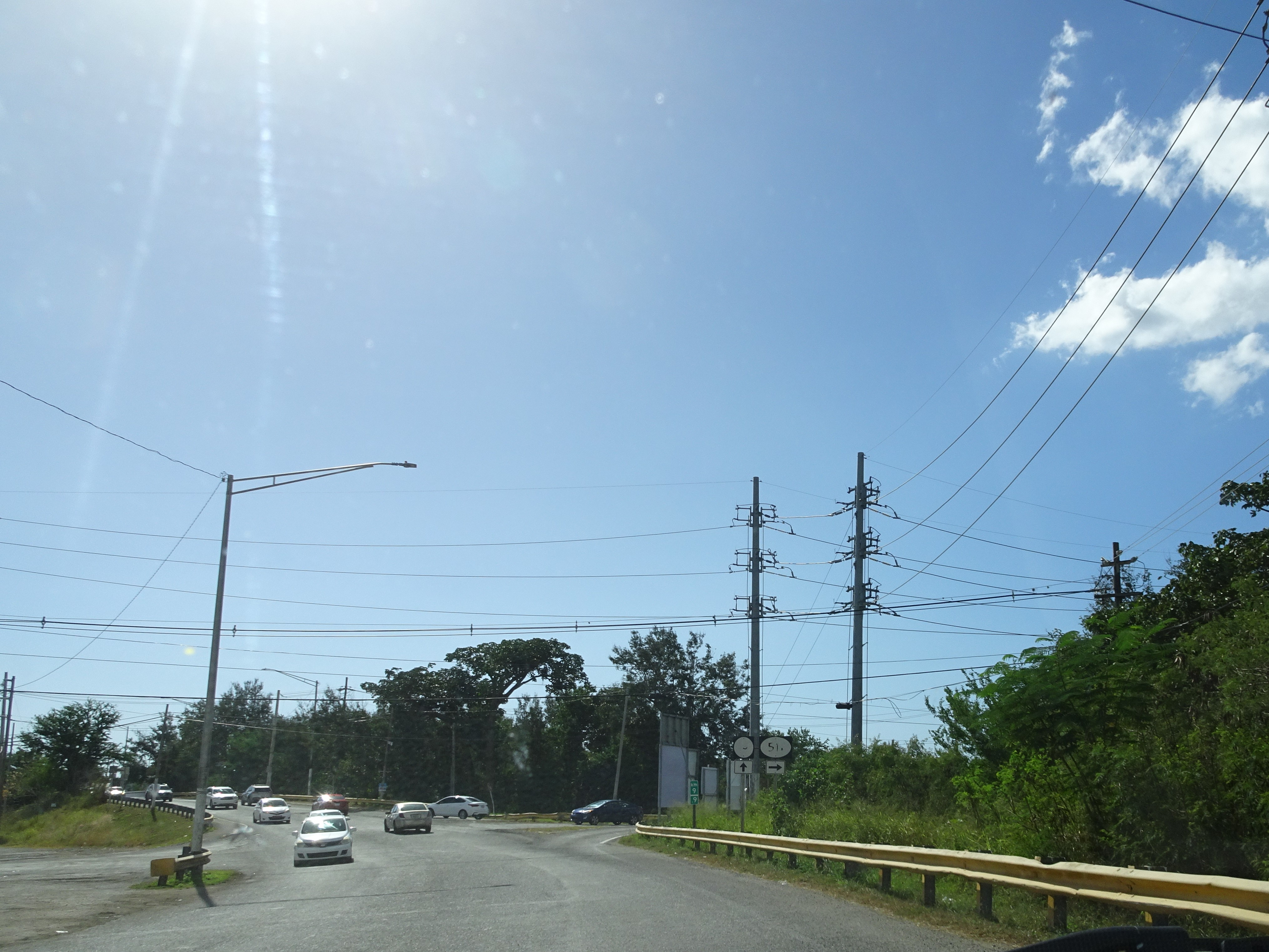
PR-14 west at PR-511 intersection

Municipality	Location	km	mi	Destinations	Notes
Ponce	Coto Laurel–Real line	0.0	0.0	PR-14 (Carretera Central) – Ponce, Juana Díaz	Southern terminus of PR-511
Ponce	Anón	16.4	10.2	PR-Sector Hacienda Cortada – Anón	Northern terminus of southern segment; dead end road
Ponce	Anón	Gap in PR-511 due to a landslides as of January 2015			
Ponce	Anón	2.5	1.6	PR-Sector Hogares Seguros – Anón	Southern terminus of northern segment; dead end road
Ponce–Jayuya municipal line	Anón–Jauca line	0.0	0.0	PR-143 (Ruta Panorámica) – Adjuntas, Barranquitas	Northern terminus of PR-511
1.000 mi = 1.609 km; 1.000 km = 0.621 mi: Closed/former

== See also ==
- List of highways in Ponce, Puerto Rico
