= Prieto River (Ponce, Puerto Rico) =

River of Puerto Rico

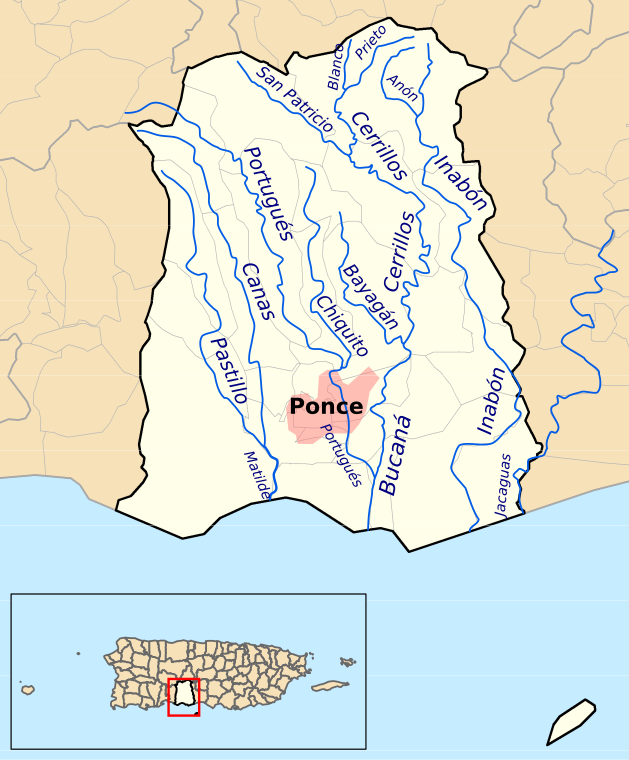
- Map showing the location of Río Prieto among the other rivers in the municipality. The area in pink represents the urban zone of the city

Location
- Commonwealth: Puerto Rico
- Municipality: Ponce

Physical characteristics
- Source
  - location: Barrio Anón
  - coordinates: 18.1438485°N 66.6079505°W
  - elevation: 3,920 feet (1,190 m) (Note: Note: There are different ways of determining a stream's source. Here the two-year-old information from the maps of the Government of Puerto Rico (dated 2009-2010) is used over the 30-year-old (dated 1981) information from the USGS as it is more consistent with 2000-2011 Google images.)
- Mouth
  - location: Rio Cerrillos
  - elevation: 1,381 feet (421 m)
- Length: 4 km (2.5 mi)

Basin features
- Progression: Barrio Anón only
- River system: Río Bucaná
- Tributaries
  - left: Quebrada Rosales; Río Blanco

Prieto River is a river in the municipality of Ponce, Puerto Rico. It is located in the northeastern area of the municipality. Forming at an altitude of 3,920 feet (1,190 m), Río Prieto originates at the second highest point of any river in the municipality after Río Inabon. It empties into Río Cerrillos. Together with Río Blanco, Río Prieto is one of the two rivers in Ponce with mouths at the highest elevation (both at 1,381 feet (421 m)). This river is one of the 14 rivers in the municipality.

== Origin ==
Río Prieto has its origin in barrio Anón in Ponce, in the area of Toro Negro State Forest, half a kilometer southwest of Cerro Jayuya and about 0.75 kilometer southeast of Cerro de Punta. It is a tributary of Río Cerrillos and part of the Río Bucana watershed.

== Course ==
Running south from its origin, Río Prieto runs for about 3 kilometers before it is fed by Rio Blanco. Río Prieto winds its way through the mountains paralleling PR-139 for about 1 kilometer before it feeds into Río Cerrillos approximately 800 feet west of the intersection of PR-139 and Camino Cerrillo in Barrio Anón.

== See also ==
- List of rivers of Puerto Rico
- List of rivers of Ponce
