= Anón =

Barrio of Ponce, Puerto Rico

- Barrio
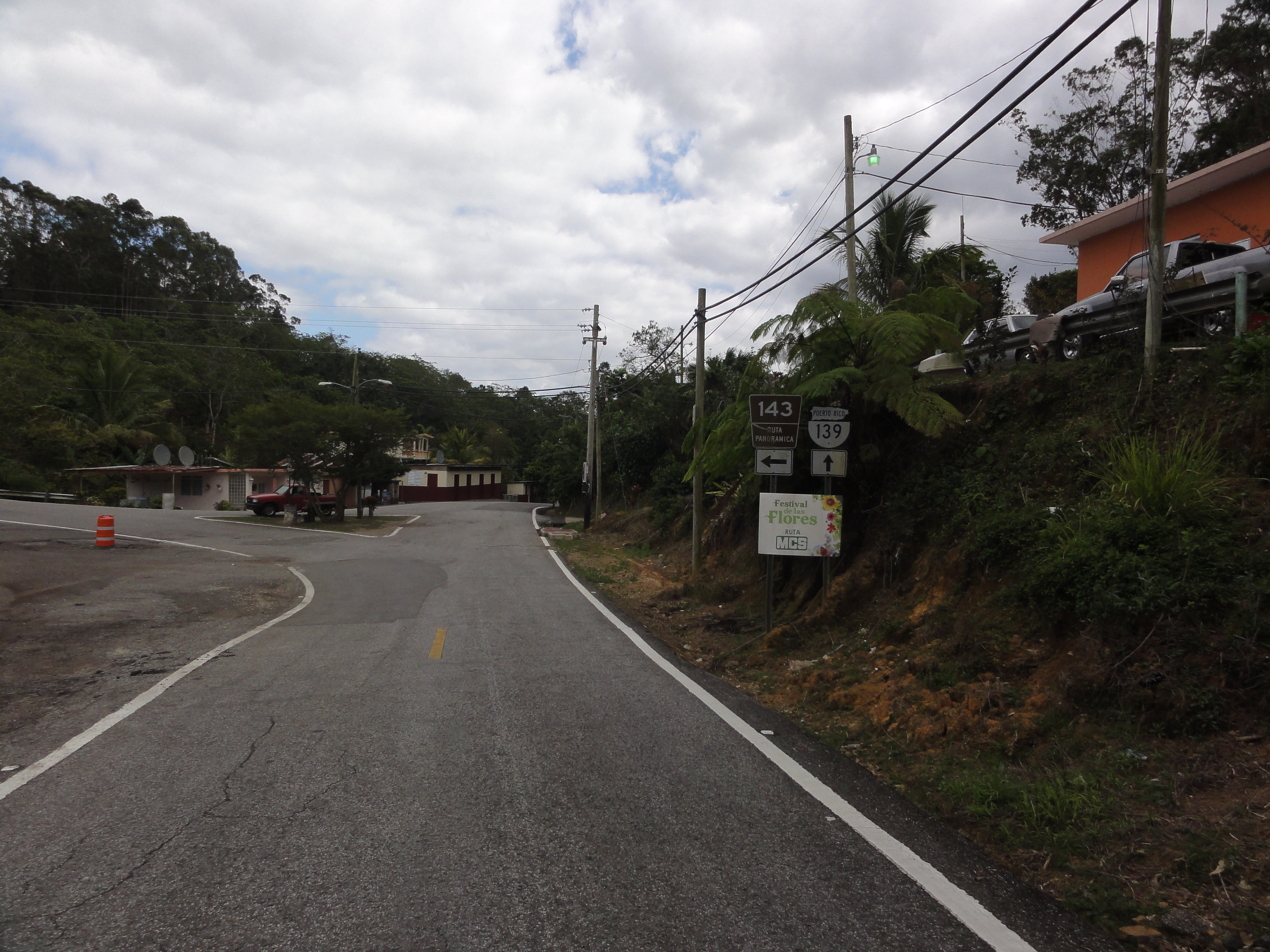
- Street scene at road PR-143 East and the northern terminus of PR-139 in Barrio Anon, Ponce, PR

- Location of barrio Anón within the municipality of Ponce shown in red

- Location of Puerto Rico
- Coordinates: 18°08′35″N 66°35′26″W
- Commonwealth: Puerto Rico
- Municipality: Ponce

Area
  - Total: 12.85 sq mi (33.3 km^{2})
  - Land: 12.85 sq mi (33.3 km^{2})
  - Water: 0 sq mi (0 km^{2})
- Elevation: 1,611 ft (491 m)

Population (2010)
  - Total: 1,670
  - Density: 130/sq mi (50/km^{2})
- Source: 2010 Census
- Time zone: UTC−4 (AST)

Anón (Barrio Anón) is one of the 31 barrios in the municipality of Ponce, Puerto Rico. Along with Marueño, Coto Laurel, Guaraguao, Quebrada Limon, Real, and San Patricio, and the coastal barrios of Canas and Capitanejo, Anón is one of the municipality's nine bordering barrios. Anón borders the municipalities of Jayuya and Juana Diaz. The name of this barrio is of native indigenous origin. It was founded in 1878. Barrio Anón is one of three Ponce barrios (the others are Barrio Guaraguao and Barrio San Patricio) located on the Cordillera Central mountain range.

== Location ==
Anón is a mountainous rural barrio located in the northern section of the municipality, north of the city of Ponce. Anon is located within the Cordillera Central and it is home to the highest peak elevation in Puerto Rico called Cerro de Punta. The toponymy, or origin of the name, is related to the fruit tree that belongs to the family Annonaceae.

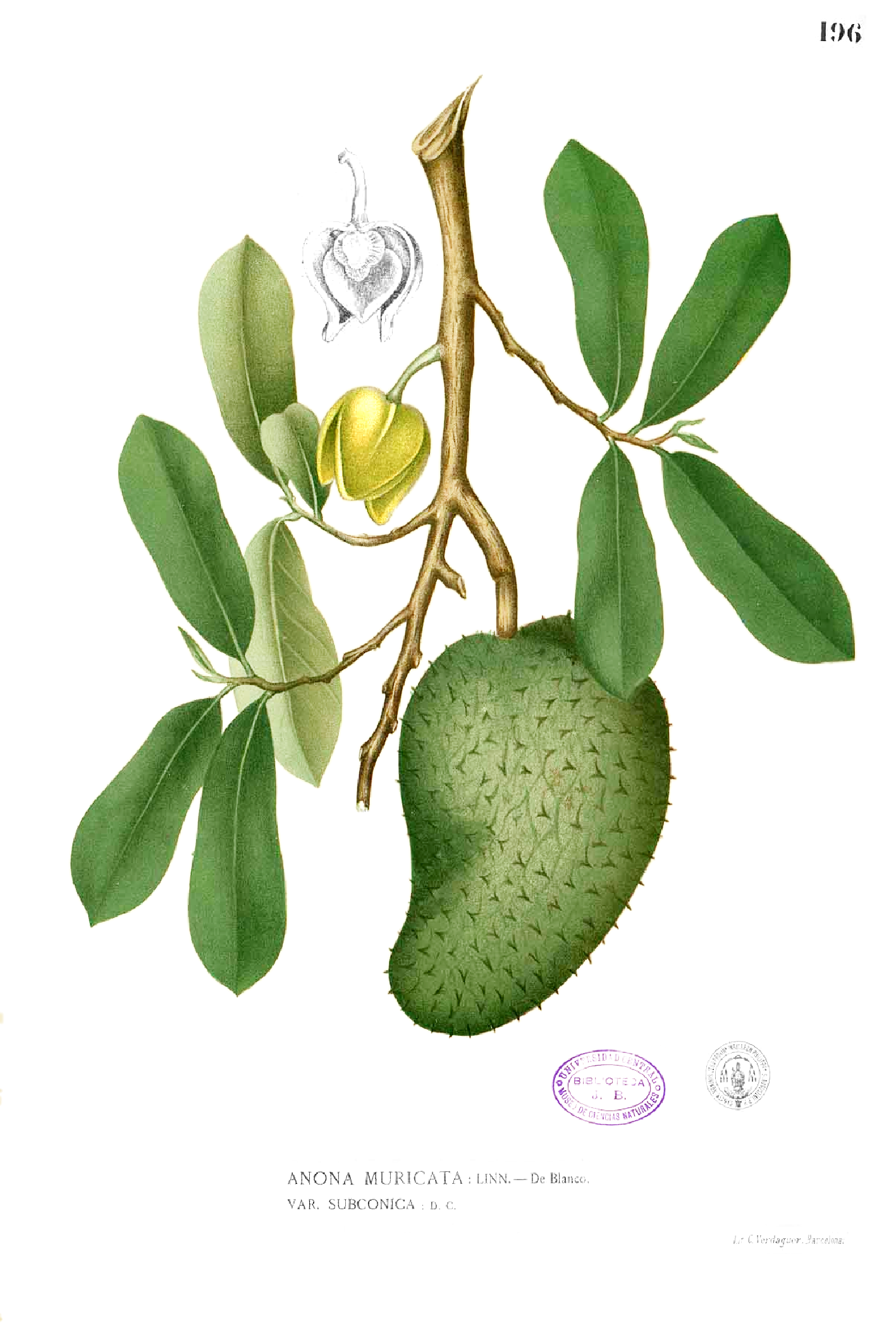
Annona muricata, or guanábana, the fruit of the tree after which this barrio is named.

== Boundaries ==
Anón is bounded on the North by PR-143 (Ruta Panorámica), on the South by the hills north of La Compuesta street and Las Mesas Road, on the West by Santo Domingo Hill, El Guayabo Road, Río Cerrillos, Río San Patricio, Cerrillo Road, and Tres Palos-Ramal 1 Road, and on the East by the hills west of PR-123.

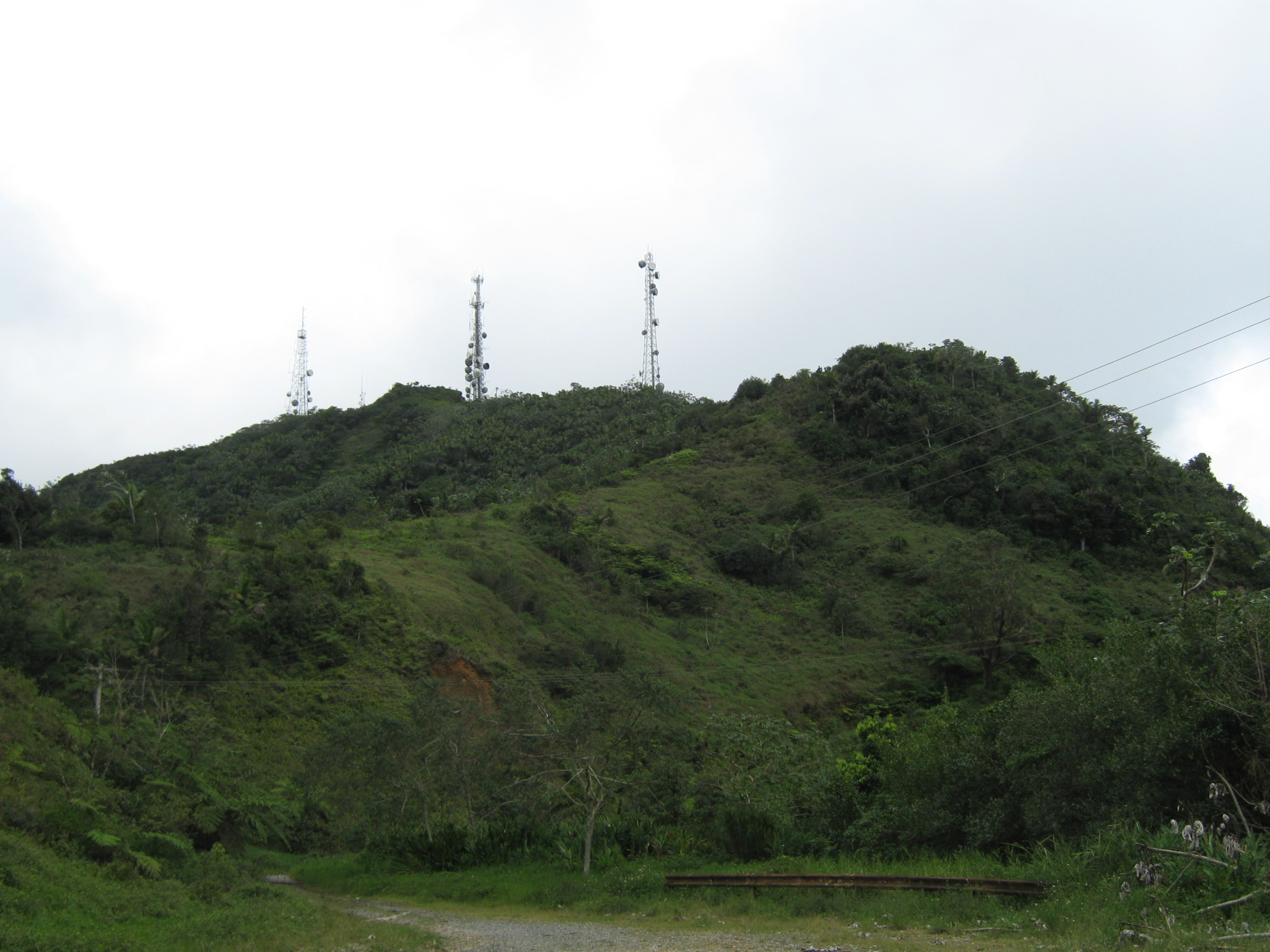
The 4390-ft Cerro de Punta peak in Barrio Anón

In terms of barrio-to-barrio boundaries, Anón is bounded in the North by Barrios Jauca, Zamas, Veguitas, and Saliente of the municipality of Jayuya, in the South by Maragüez and Real, in the West by San Patricio, and in the East by Barrio Collores of the municipality of Juana Díaz. Among all 31 barrios of Ponce, Anon has the distinction of bordering the most barrios of another municipality, namely, the four barrios of the municipality of Jayuya, or five barrios when Collores (municipality of Juana Díaz) is included.

== Demographics ==
Anón is home to the communities of Jurutungo, Los Chinos, Vista Alegre, Raices, and Hogares Seguros.

Historical population
Census	Pop.	Note	%±
1900	1,734		—
1910	1,667		−3.9%
1920	1,984		19.0%
1930	1,870		−5.7%
1940	2,008		7.4%
1950	2,084		3.8%
1960	2,100		0.8%
1970	1,977		−5.9%
1980	2,134		7.9%
1990	1,672		−21.6%
2000	1,669		−0.2%
2010	1,670		0.1%
U.S. Decennial Census; 1899 (shown as 1900) 1910-1930; 1930-1950 1960 1970 1980-2000 2010

In 2000, the population of Anón was 1,669 persons, and it had a density of 130 persons per square mile. In 2010, the population of Anón was 1670, and it had a density of 130 persons per square mile. Anón is the largest barrio in the municipality of Ponce by land area after Canas, but it is the third least populated, after San Patricio and Tibes.

== Infrastructure ==
Major roads serving Barrio Anón are PR-143, PR-139, PR-511, and PR-517.

== Geography ==
Anón has 12.85 square miles (33.3 km^{2}) of land area and no water area.

Anón is home to some of Puerto Rico's highest peaks. The highest point in Barrio Anón is Cerro de Punta which, at 4,390 feet, is also the highest point in Puerto Rico. Monte Jayuya is the barrio's second highest point at 4,300 feet. Barrio Anón is also home to the origin of the Anón and Inabón rivers. Rio Anón feeds into Rio Inabon within the boundaries of Barrio Anón to eventually empty as Rio Inabon into the Caribbean opposite Caja de Muertos. Rio Blanco and Rio Prieto are two other important rivers in Barrio Anón. Anón is also home to the Toro Negro State Forest; some 40% of the area of Toro Negro is located in Barrio Anón.

== Jurutungo ==
The community of Jurutungo is found deep in the central section of barrio Anón. Jurutungo is a Puerto Rican word that means "a place very, very far away, which is hard or tiresome to get to" (See Examples of typical Puerto Rican vocabulary). However, it is not known if the populated place in Barrio Anón was named after the meaning of the word, or if the word developed as a result of the remoteness of the Jurutungo populated place.

== See also ==
- List of communities in Puerto Rico
