= San Patricio River =

River of Puerto Rico

- Location of mouth

Location
- Commonwealth: Puerto Rico
- Municipality: Ponce

Physical characteristics
- Source
  - location: Corcho, Utuado
  - coordinates: 18.1177384°N 66.6068395°W
  - elevation: 1,917 feet (584 m)
- Mouth
  - location: Cerrillos River
  - elevation: 660 feet (200 m)
- Length: 6.3 km (3.9 mi)

Basin features
- Progression: San Patricio; Maragüez
- River system: Río Bucaná
- Tributaries
  - left: Quebrada La Mocha

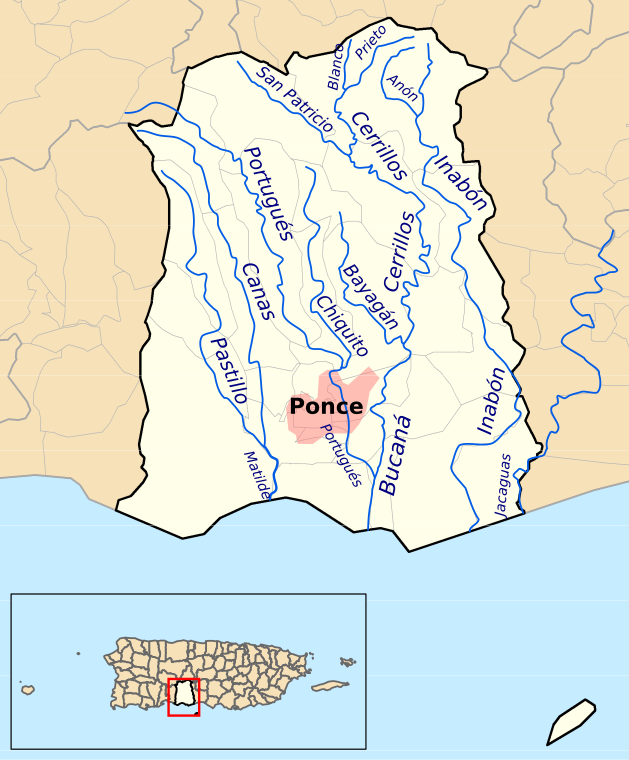
Map showing the location of Río San Patricio among the other rivers in the municipality. The area in pink represents the urban zone of the city.

San Patricio River (Spanish: Río San Patricio) is a river in the municipality of Ponce, Puerto Rico. It is part of the Bucaná River river system via Cerrillos River. San Patricio is one of the 14 rivers in the municipality.

== Origin ==
San Patricio River has its origin in the sector called Corcho, in the municipality of Utuado.

== Progression ==
The river's course is southward from Utuado and into barrio San Patricio of the municipality of Ponce. After progressing south through barrio San Patricio, the river enters barrio Maragüez also in the municipality of Ponce. From there it continues its southerly progression until it feeds into Río Cerrillos.

== See also ==
- List of rivers of Puerto Rico
- List of rivers of Ponce
