= Cerrillos River =

River of Puerto Rico

Cerrillos River Río Maragüez
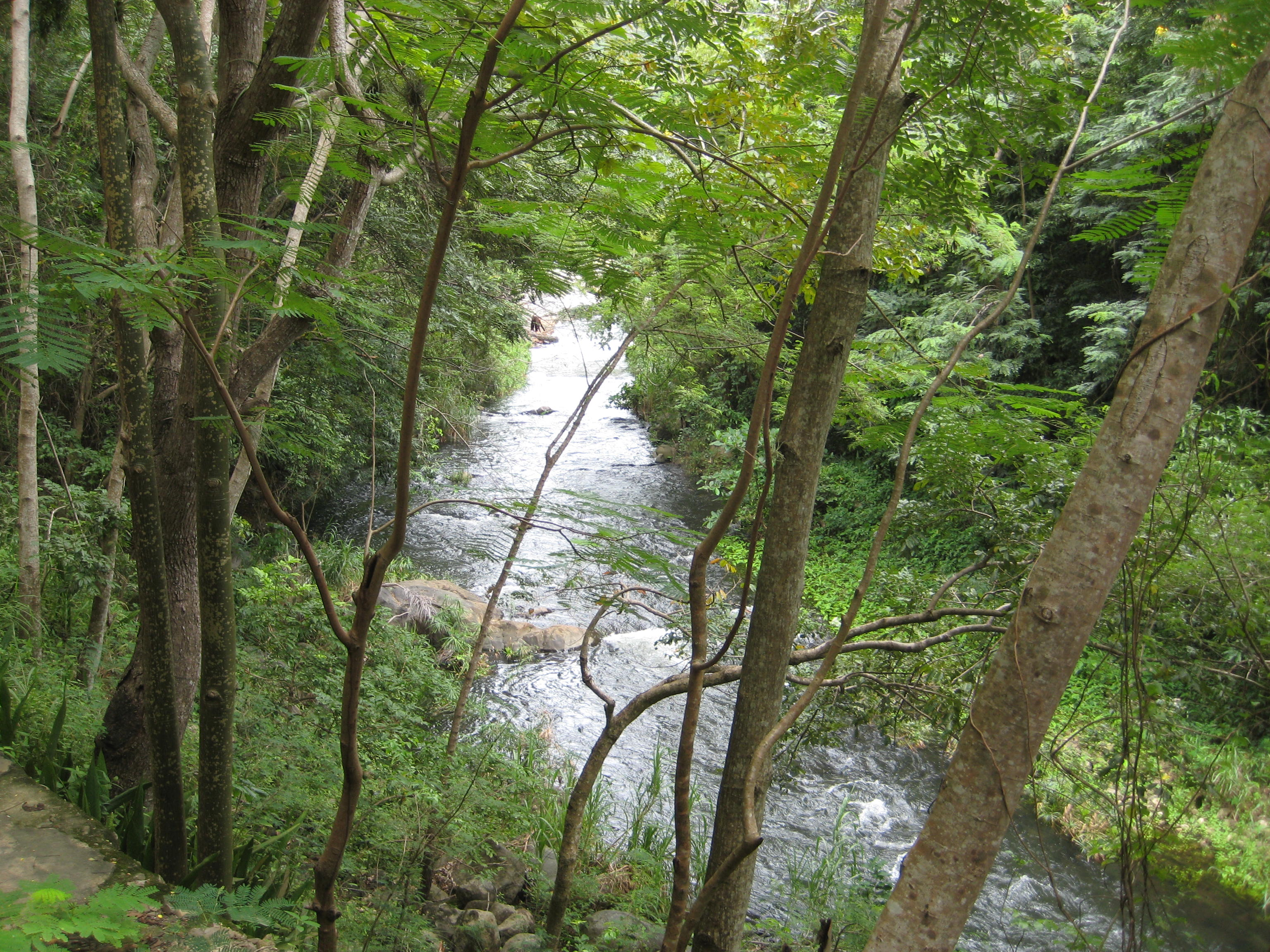
- Cerrillos River near the Lake Cerrillos Dam

- Location of mouth
- Etymology: Barrio Cerrillos
- Native name: Río Cerrillos (Spanish)

Location
- Commonwealth: Puerto Rico
- Municipality: Ponce

Physical characteristics
- Source
  - location: Barrio Anón
  - coordinates: 18.1319046°N 66.5798949°W
  - elevation: 1,200 feet (370 m)
- Mouth
  - location: Río Bucaná
  - elevation: 69 feet (21 m)
- Length: 18.5 miles (29.8 km)
- Basin size: 17.80 sq mi (46.1 km^{2})
- Discharge
  - average: 24,000 cu ft/s (680 m^{3}/s)

Basin features
- Progression: Anón; Maragüez; Cerrillos
- River system: Río Bucaná
- Tributaries
  - left: Río Bayagán; Quebrada Ausubo; Río San Patricio
  - right: Río Prieto

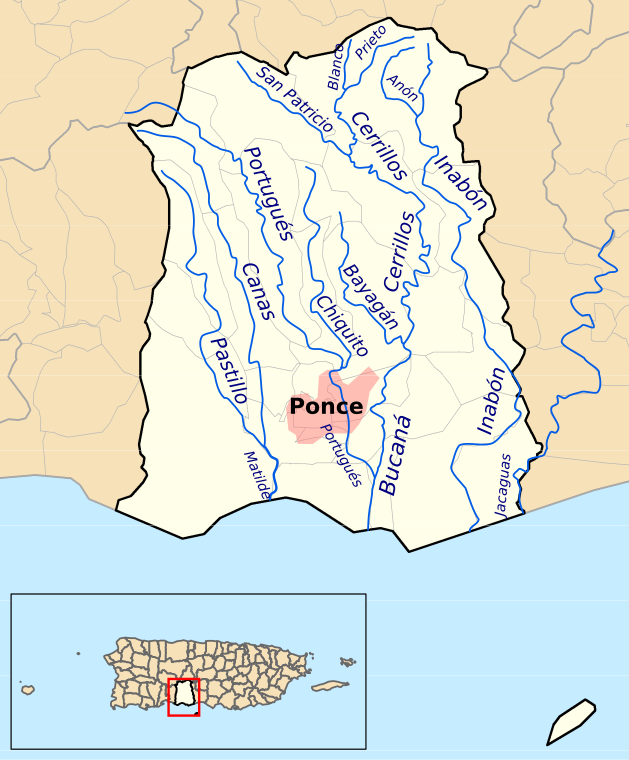
Map showing the location of Río Cerrillos among the other rivers in the municipality. The area in pink represents the urban zone of the city

Cerrillos River (Spanish: Río Cerrillos) is a river in the municipality of Ponce, Puerto Rico. Río Cerrillos has its origin in barrio Anón and runs south until it feeds into Bucaná River. Río Cerrillos is commonly known by the locals as Maragüez River, because most of its course runs through Barrio Maragüez. This river is one of the 14 rivers in the municipality. The river has a discharge of 24,000 cubic feet per second, making it the second most affluent river in the municipality after Río Jacaguas.

== Course ==
From its origin about 1 kilometer south of the intersection of PR-139 and PR-143, Río Cerrillos runs south for 1.8 kilometers where it is fed by Río Prieto west of PR-139. From this point on, Rio Cerrillos runs parallel to PR-139 for 2 kilometers in barrio Anón before reaching barrio Maragüez. Continuing on its southernly course for about 1.2 kilometers, Río Cerrillos is fed by Río San Patricio. Five kilometers further downstream Río Cerrillos forms Lake Cerrillos, as a result of its dam. Flowing out of the Cerrillos dam, Río Cerrillos runs south for 1 kilometer until it enters barrios Machuelo Arriba and barrio Cerrillos, being the boundary between the two barrios. The river continues its southern course parallel to PR-139 for 5 kilometers until it reaches PR-5139. In another kilometer downstream it is fed by Quebrada Ausubo, and another kilometer further south it is fed by Río Bayagán. At this point it feeds into Río Bucaná where it terminates.

The following table summarizes the course of Río Cerrillos in terms of roads crossed. Roads are listed as the river flows from its origin in the mountains of Barrio Anón, north of the city of Ponce, to its merging with Río Bayagán in Barrio Machuelo Arriba to form Río Bucaná (N/A = Data not available):

No.	Barrio	Road	Road's km marker	NBI ID	Bridge name (if any)	Direction (of bridge traffic)	Coordinates	Notes
1	Maragüez	PR-139	10.5	22051	Unnamed	Both	18°6′18.3954″N 66°35′16.1874″W	1.6 km N of entrance to Area Recreativa del Lago Cerrillos y Atracadero, Barrio Maragüez
2	Machuelo Arriba	PR-5139	2.5	29131	Unnamed	Both	18°3′34.9554″N 66°35′10.464″W	0.5 km E of INT of PR-139, PR-5139, and PR-139R (aka, Ave. Principal)
3	Machuelo Arriba	Camino Sector Wachin	not marked	28741	Unnamed	Both	18°3′30.1674″N 66°35′2.4″W	0.1 km S of PR-5139 and Cam. Sector Wachin; Off PR-5139 km 2.0

== Cerrillos Lake and Dam ==
Cerrillos is the feeder river for Lake Cerrillos Dam in Barrio Maragüez, in the municipality of Ponce. The lake is an artificial reservoir holding 47,900 acre-feet (59,100,000 m3) of water. The dam that made the lake possible was completed in 1992. The lake is surrounded by the Cerrillos State Forest north of the dam. The area immediately south of the dam is a park, the Luis A. Wito Morales Park.

== See also ==
- List of rivers of Puerto Rico
- List of rivers of Ponce
