= Río Blanco (Ponce, Puerto Rico) =

River of Puerto Rico

Location
- Commonwealth: Puerto Rico
- Municipality: Ponce

Physical characteristics
- Source
  - location: Barrio Anón
  - coordinates: 18.1438485°N 66.6079505°W
  - elevation: 2,970 feet (910 m) (Note: Note: There is no agreed definition of a stream's source. Here the two-year-old information from the maps of the Government of Puerto Rico (dated 2009-2010) is used over the 30-year-old (dated 1981) information from the USGS as it is more consistent with 2000-2011 Google images.)
- Mouth
  - location: Prieto River
  - elevation: 1,381 feet (421 m)
- Length: 2 km (1.2 mi)

Basin features
- Progression: Barrio Anon
- River system: Río Bucana
- Tributaries
  - left: Quebrada Jamiel

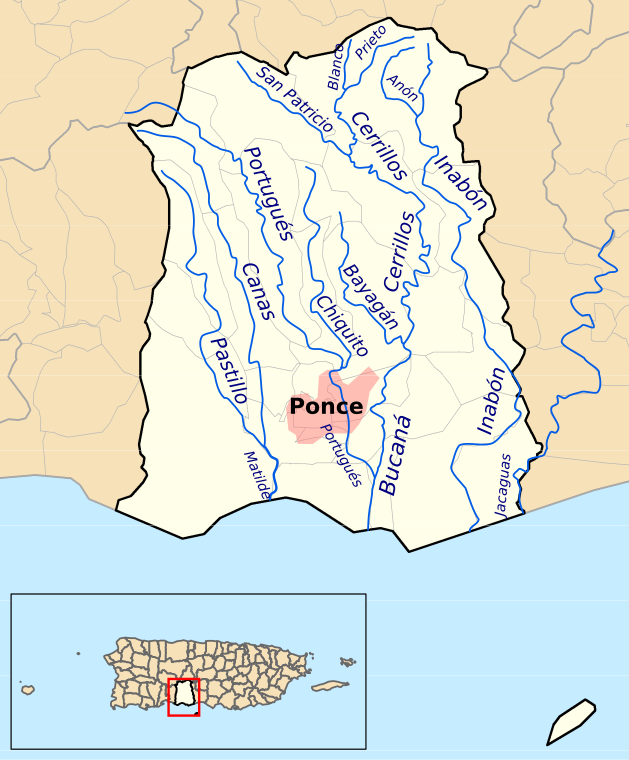
Map showing the location of Río Blanco among the other rivers in the municipality. The area in pink represents the urban zone of the city

Río Blanco (Spanish for white river) is a river in the municipality of Ponce, Puerto Rico. It is located in the northeastern area of the municipality. It empties into the Río Prieto. Together with the Río Prieto, the Río Blanco is one of the two rivers in Ponce with their mouth at the highest elevation (both at 1,381 feet). This river is one of the 14 rivers in the municipality.

== Origin and course ==
The Río Blanco originates in the mountains of barrio Anón in Ponce, right at the foot of PR-143, in the Toro Negro State Forest, and cuts through the northern mountains of Barrio Anón. It runs for about 1.8 kilometers before it is fed by Quebrada Jamiel (Jamiel Brook). After this it runs for about 0.2 kilometer before it feeds into Río Prieto, some 800 feet southwest of the intersection of PR-139 and Camino La Poblada.

== See also ==
- List of rivers of Puerto Rico
- List of rivers of Ponce
