= Río Inabón =

River of Puerto Rico

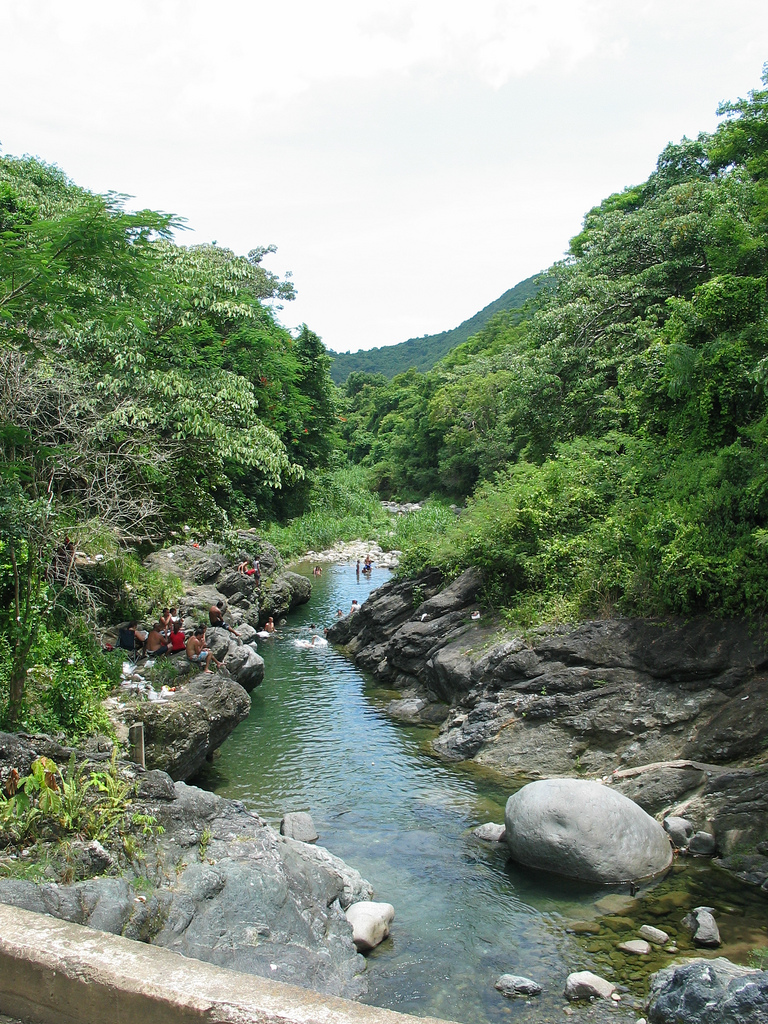
- Rio Inabon in Barrio Real in Ponce, Puerto Rico

- Location of mouth

Location
- Commonwealth: Puerto Rico
- Municipality: Ponce

Physical characteristics
- Source
  - location: Cerro Camacho, Barrio Anón, Ponce (near Jayuya)
  - coordinates: 17.9688559°N 66.5582270°W
  - elevation: 4,100 feet (1,200 m)
- Mouth
  - location: Caribbean Sea
  - elevation: 0 feet (0 m)
- Length: 19.89 miles (32.01 km)
- Basin size: 38.18 mi^{2} (98.9 km^{2})
- Discharge
  - average: 15,000 cu ft/s (420 m^{3}/s)

Basin features
- Progression: Anón; Real; Coto Laurel; Capitanejo/Vayas
- River system: Río Inabón
- Tributaries
  - left: Río Anón
  - right: Río Guayo; Quebrada Emajagua

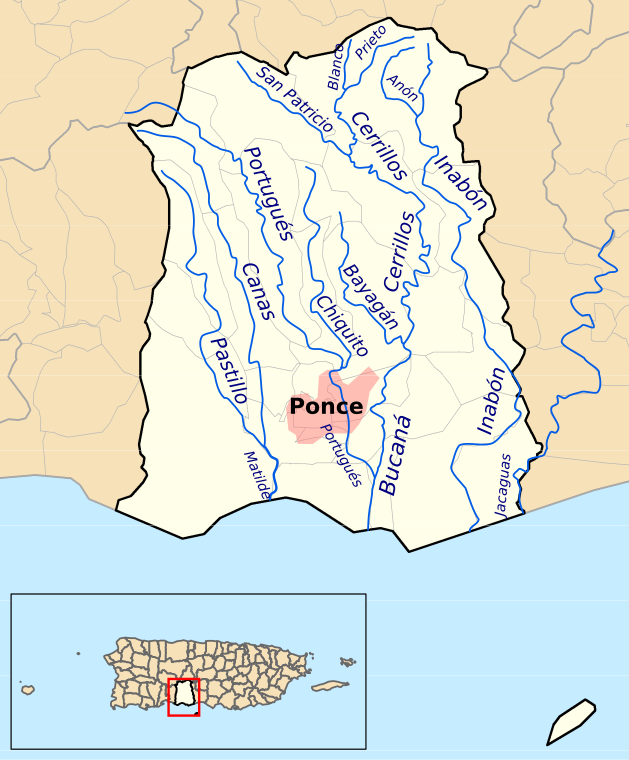
Map showing the location of Río Inabón among the other rivers in the municipality. The area in pink represents the urban zone of the city.

Río Inabón is one of the 14 rivers in the municipality of Ponce, Puerto Rico. With a length of some 32.01 kilometers (19.89 mi), it is Ponce's second longest river after Río Jacaguas. It is fed by the Río Anón, Río Guayo (which itself is fed by the Chiquita Brook and the Indalecia Brook) and the Emajagua Brook. It is also fed by Río Bacas and Río de las Raices. Originating at an altitude of approximately 4,100 feet (1,200 m), it forms at a higher altitude than any of the other 13 rivers in the municipality, and at one of the highest points of any river in Puerto Rico. With a watershed area covering 38.18 square miles, Río Inabón also has the second largest basin area of any of the municipality's 14 rivers after Río Jacaguas.

== Origin and course ==
Río Inabón has its origin at 4,100 feet (1,200 m) above sea level in Cerro Camacho, in barrio Anón, near Anón's boundary with the municipality of Jayuya. The river runs mostly parallel to PR-511.

== Uses ==
"A provision in The Treaty of Paris of 1898 grants the Serrallés family exclusive rights to the Río Inabón. This river winds through Puerto Rico’s volcanic mountains, and is the exclusive water source for DonQ Rum". Today Río Inabón is one of the most popular rivers for swimming in southern Puerto Rico. Some 10 private reservoirs in the Ponce area are fed by the waters of Río Inabón.

== Environmental contamination ==
In January 2011, Puerto Rico Representative Víctor Vassallo Anadón presented a bill into the Puerto Rico House of Representatives that would improve the sewer system of residents near the river to avoid contaminating it with sewer waters.

== Endangered species ==
The fern Thelypteris inabonensis found at the headwaters of Río Inabón and at the Toro Negro State Forest has been identified by the U.S. Fish and Wildlife Service as an endangered species.

== Flow ==
The flow of water in the river is controlled by the floodgates at Toa Vaca Lake, located in the municipality of Villalba. Río Inabon has a discharge of 15,000 ft^{3}/s. The Inabón has been known to overflow easily in times of heavy rains. Several rescues have taken place when the river has increased its level rapidly, a phenomenon known as flash flood. Due to its proximity to the eastern end of Aeropuerto Mercedita, the river has affected the operation of the airport in times of heavy rains. This was the case with the hurricane Maria in September 2017.

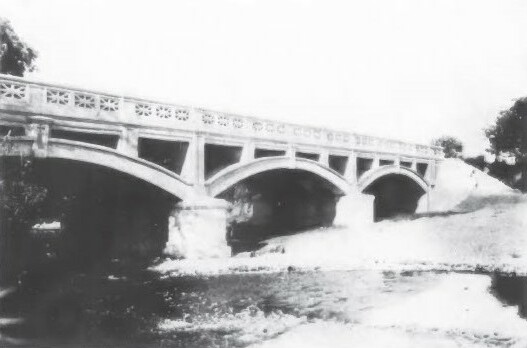
Bridge over Río Inabón on PR-1 between Ponce and Santa Isabel in 1920.

=== Course of the river ===
The following table summarizes the course of Río Inabón in terms of roads crossed. Roads are listed as the river flows from its origin in the mountains of Barrio Anón, north of the city of Ponce, to the Caribbean Sea in the south (N/A = Data not available):

No.	Barrio	Road	Road's km marker	NBI ID	Bridge name (if any)	Direction (of bridge traffic)	Coordinates	Notes
1	Anón	Unnamed	not marked	23401	Unnamed	Both	18°7′55.8114″N 66°34′47.244″W	0.1 km East of PR-511, km 12.7, on Unnamed Road*
2	Anón	PR-511	12.5*	27031	Unnamed	Both	18°7′28.524″N 66°34′41.484″W	0.3 km North of Calle Guarayo
3	Anón	Unnamed	not marked	29441	Unnamed	Both	18°7′20.1″N 66°34′39.54″W	0.1 km West of PR-511, km 12.7, on Unnamed Road (0.1 km north of Calle Guayaro)*
4	Anón	PR-511	11.7*	29421	Unnamed	Both	18°7′15.1674″N 66°34′18.2994″W	0.1 km South of Camino Rosaly. (From this point southward, Río Inabón runs on the west side of PR-511)
5	Real	Calle Sector Jurutungo	not marked	29431	Unnamed	Both	18°5′52.3674″N 66°33′48.8514″W	At Charca Puente del Agua, 0.1 km West of PR-511, km 12.65, on Camino Sector Jurutungo; 0.3 km North of Capilla Catolica San Martin*
6	Coto Laurel	PR-14	9.8	22041	Unnamed	Both	18°3′0.4314″N 66°32′41.4594″W	0.5 km NE of Barrio Coto Laurel; 0.1 km west of INT PR-14 & PR-511.
7	Sabana Llana	PR-52	94.3	N/A	Unnamed	Southbound	18°2′23.136″N 66°32′15.072″W	PR-52 SB in Municipality of Juana Diaz
8	Sabana Llana	PR-52	94.3	N/A	Unnamed	Northbound	18°2′22.416″N 66°32′14.64″W	PR-52 NB in Municipality of Juana Diaz
9	Sabana Llana	C. Ramal/Av. San Cristobal	N/A	25141	Unnamed	Both	18°2′19.9314″N 66°32′14.172″W	Calle Ramal (Calle Laredo) is accessible via Ave. San Cristobal located behind Hospital San Cristobal; Bridge is parallel to the PR-52 km 94.3, bridges
10	Capitanejo, Vayas	PR-1	120.4	251	Unnamed	Both	18°0′14.796″N 66°33′12.132″W	0.1 km west of PR-507, Ponce, immediately east of Aeropuerto Mercedita (6.5 km E of Ponce). Bridge has Ponce's Barrio Vayas to its west and Juana Diaz's Barrio Capitanejo to its east.

- *Marker requires field verification.

== See also ==
- List of rivers of Puerto Rico
- List of rivers of Ponce
