= Bayagán River =

River of Ponce, Puerto Rico

Río Bayagán
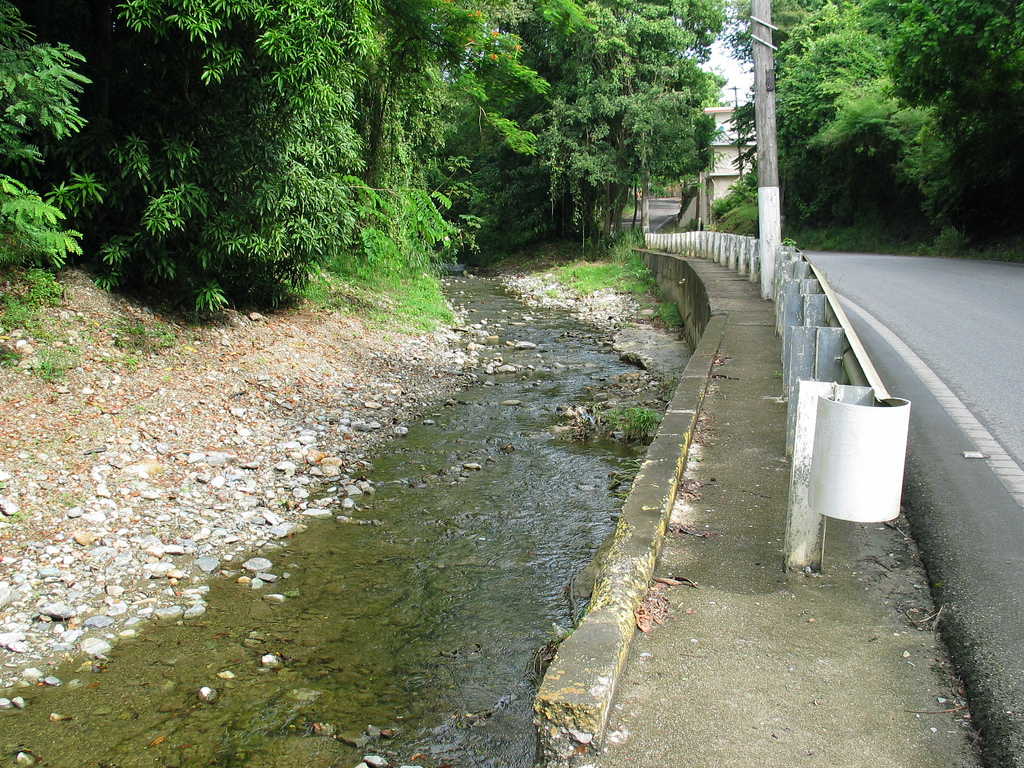
- Río Bayagán running alongside PR-505 in Barrio Machuelo Arriba, Ponce, Puerto Rico

- Location of mouth

Location
- Commonwealth: Puerto Rico
- Municipality: Ponce

Physical characteristics
- Source
  - location: Barrio Montes Llanos
  - coordinates: 18.0435751°N 66.5857282°W
  - elevation: 1,650 feet (500 m)(intermittent); 141 feet (43 m) (perennial)
- Mouth
  - location: Rio Cerrillos, Barrio Machuelo Arriba
  - elevation: 42 feet (13 m)
- Length: 9 km (5.6 mi)

Basin features
- Progression: Barrio Montes Llanos, Barrio Machuelo Arriba
- River system: Río Bucaná

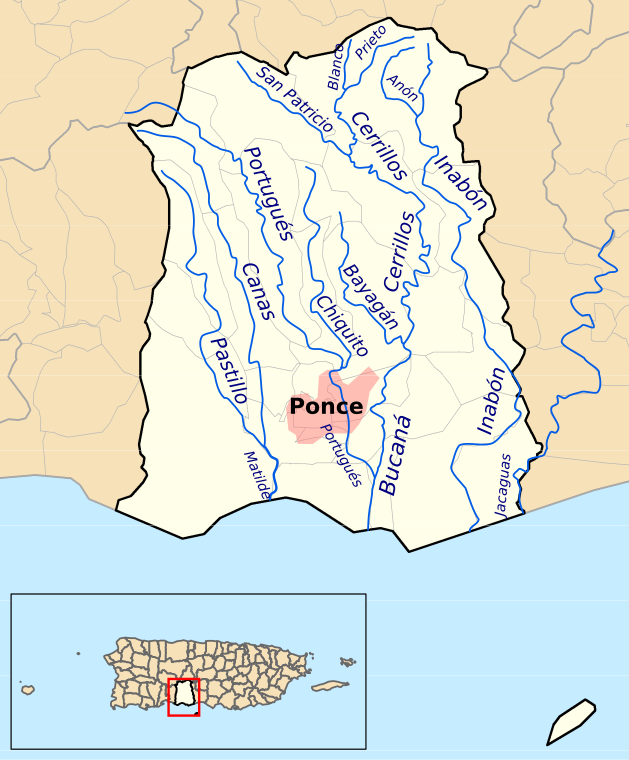
Map showing the location of Río Bayagán among the other rivers in the municipality. The area in pink represents the urban zone of the city

Río Bayagán is a river in the municipality of Ponce, Puerto Rico. Bayagán is a tributary of Cerrillos River. It has a length of approximately six kilometers and runs in a southerly direction, mostly along PR-505. It originates in barrio Montes Llanos and runs south through barrio Machuelo Arriba for about nine kilometers until it meets Río Cerrillos. It is part of the Bucaná River watershed. This river is one of the 14 rivers in the municipality.

== Origin ==
Río Bayagán has its origin in Montes Llanos, in an area about two kilometers northwest of Pico Pinto (English: Pinto Peak). This river extends from the mountains in Montes Llanos and gathers waters from the streams in the vicinity of 18.08908 North and 66.61629 West, in the area of Hacienda Usera.

== Course and extension ==
Río Bayagán progresses in a southern direction through barrio Machuelo Arriba making its way southward until its mouth. Rio Bayagan's mouth is at coordinates 18.043575 North and 66.585728 West, just west of Urbanización Valle Alto in the city of Ponce. At that point it feeds into Rio Cerrillos, at an altitude of 42 feet. Rio Cerrillos will, in turn feed, into Río Bucaná further downstream, with the latter emptying into the Caribbean Sea about eight kilometers further downstream.

The following table summarizes the course of Río Bayagán in terms of roads crossed. Roads are listed as the river flows from its origin in the mountains of Montes Llanos, north of the city of Ponce, to its merging with Rio Cerrillos in Barrio Machuelo Arriba to form Rio Bucana (N/A = Data not available):

| No. | Barrio | Road | Road's km marker | NBI ID | Bridge name (if any) | Direction (of bridge traffic) | Coordinates | Notes |
|---|---|---|---|---|---|---|---|---|
| 1 | Machuelo Arriba | PR-505 | 1.9 | 16361 | Unnamed | Both | unknown | |
| 2 | Machuelo Arriba | PR-139 | 1.7 | 18591 | Unnamed | Both | 18°2′48.0114″N 66°35′13.02″W | |

== Length and type ==
Bayagán is only six kilometers long. However, the river is mostly an intermittent river, being perennial only about half a kilometer of its final course. Like several other rivers in southern Puerto Rico, Río Bayagán flows perennially only during the rainy season.

== See also ==
- List of rivers of Puerto Rico
- List of rivers of Ponce
