= Puerto Rico Highway 515 =

Highway in Puerto Rico

Highway 515
- Ruta 515

Route information
- Maintained by Puerto Rico DTPW
- Length: 1.5 km (0.93 mi)

Major junctions
- West end: PR-123 in Guaraguao
- East end: PR-10 in San Patricio

Location
- Country: United States
- Territory: Puerto Rico
- Municipalities: Ponce

Highway system
- Roads in Puerto Rico; List
← PR-511	→ PR-516

Puerto Rico Highway 515 (PR-515) is a short tertiary highway in Ponce, Puerto Rico. The road runs east to west in barrio Guaraguao. It originates at the boundary between barrio Guaraguao and barrio San Patricio on PR-10 and runs west until its terminus with PR-123. The road is approximately 0.75 mile long.

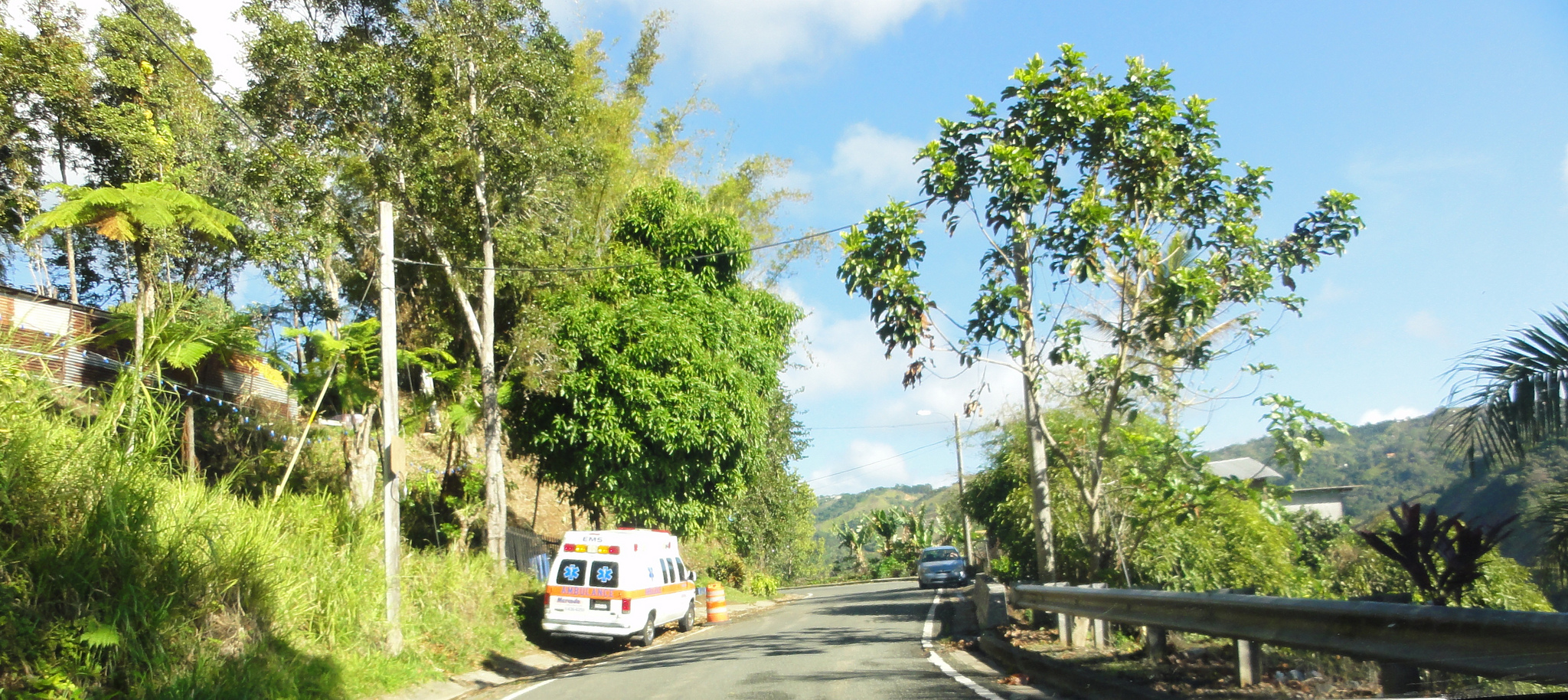
Puerto Rico Highway 515 in Guaraguao

== Major intersections ==
The entire route is located in Ponce.

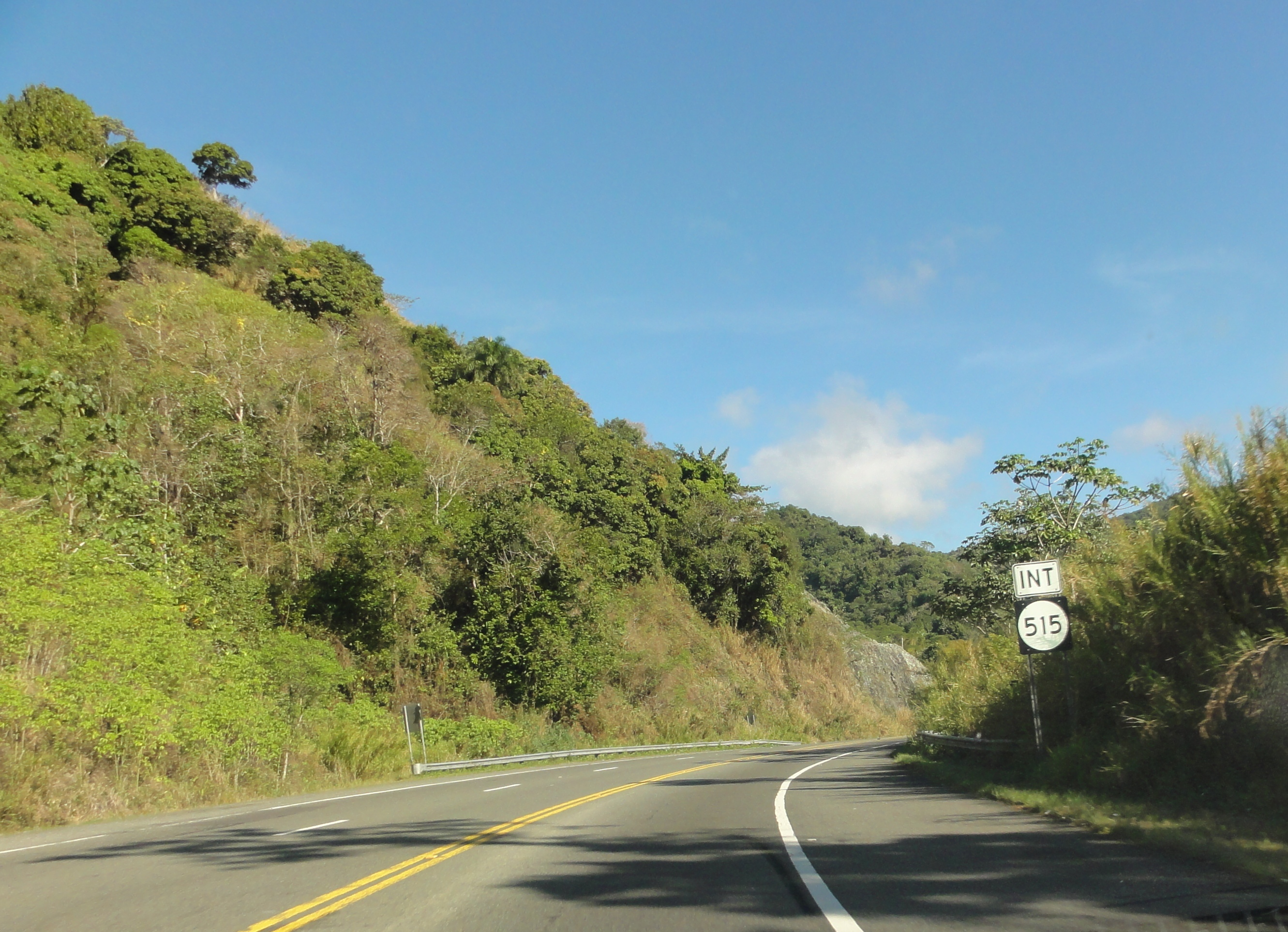
Road sign on northbound PR-10 announcing intersection with PR-515 in Barrio Guaraguao, Ponce, Puerto Rico

Location	km	mi	Destinations	Notes
Guaraguao	0.0	0.0	PR-123 – Ponce, Adjuntas	Western terminus of PR-515
San Patricio	1.5	0.93	PR-10 (Carretera Salvador "Chiry" Vasallo Ruiz) – Ponce, Adjuntas	Eastern terminus of PR-515
1.000 mi = 1.609 km; 1.000 km = 0.621 mi

== See also ==
- List of highways in Ponce, Puerto Rico
