= Guayo River =

River of Puerto Rico

Coordinates: 18.0413525°N 66.5376723°W

- Native name: Río Guayo (Spanish)

Location
- Commonwealth: Puerto Rico
- Municipality: Juana Díaz

Physical characteristics
- Source
  - location: Barrio Collores, Juana Diaz
  - elevation: 141 ft
- Mouth
  - location: Rio Inabon (Ponce)

Basin features
- Progression: Municipality of Juana Diaz
- Tributaries
  - right: Quebrada Indalecia

The Guayo River (Spanish: Río Guayo) is a river near barrio Collores in the municipality of Juana Diaz, Puerto Rico.

== See also ==
- List of rivers of Puerto Rico
