= Maragüez =

Barrio of Ponce, Puerto Rico

- Barrio
- Location of barrio Maragüez within the municipality of Ponce shown in red

- Location of Puerto Rico
- Coordinates: 18°05′53″N 66°35′20″W
- Commonwealth: Puerto Rico
- Municipality: Ponce

Area
  - Total: 6.40 sq mi (16.6 km^{2})
  - Land: 5.34 sq mi (13.8 km^{2})
  - Water: 1.06 sq mi (2.7 km^{2})
- Elevation: 774 ft (236 m)

Population (2010)
  - Total: 545
  - Density: 102.1/sq mi (39.4/km^{2})
- Source: 2010 Census
- Time zone: UTC−04:00 (AST)

Maragüez (Barrio Maragüez) is one of the 31 barrios of the municipality of Ponce, Puerto Rico. Along with Magueyes, Tibes, Portugués, Montes Llanos, Machuelo Arriba, Sabanetas, and Cerrillos, Maragüez is one of the municipality's eight rural interior barrios. The name of this barrio is of native Indian origin. It was created in 1878.

== Location ==
Maragüez is a rural barrio located in the northeastern section of the municipality, northeast of the city of Ponce at latitude 18.106178 N, and longitude -66.595986 W.

== Boundaries ==
It is bounded on the North by barrios Anón and San Patricio, in the South by barrio Cerrillos, in the West by barrios Monte Llano and Machuelo Arriba, and in the East by barrios Anón and Real. Río Cerrillos runs a large stretch of its course through barrio Maragüez, and is known locally (and unofficially) as Rio Maragüez.

== Features and demographics ==
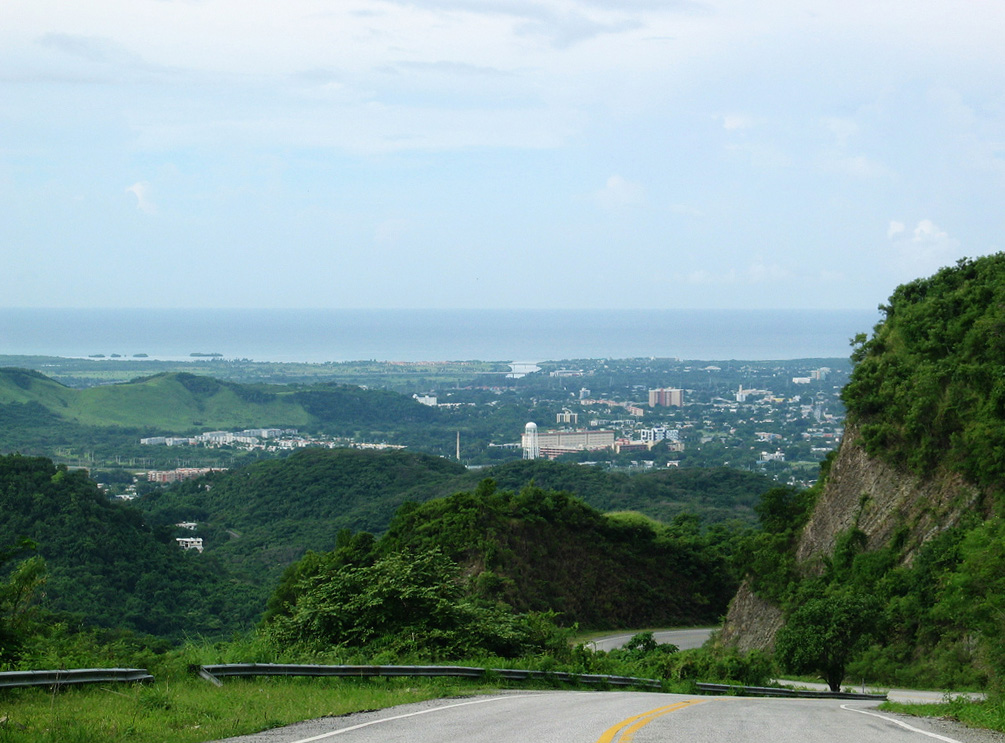
Puerto Rico Highway 139 (PR-139) in Barrio Maraguez, heading South-bound, with the City of Ponce and the Rio Portugues channel in the background and the Caribbean Sea in the far background

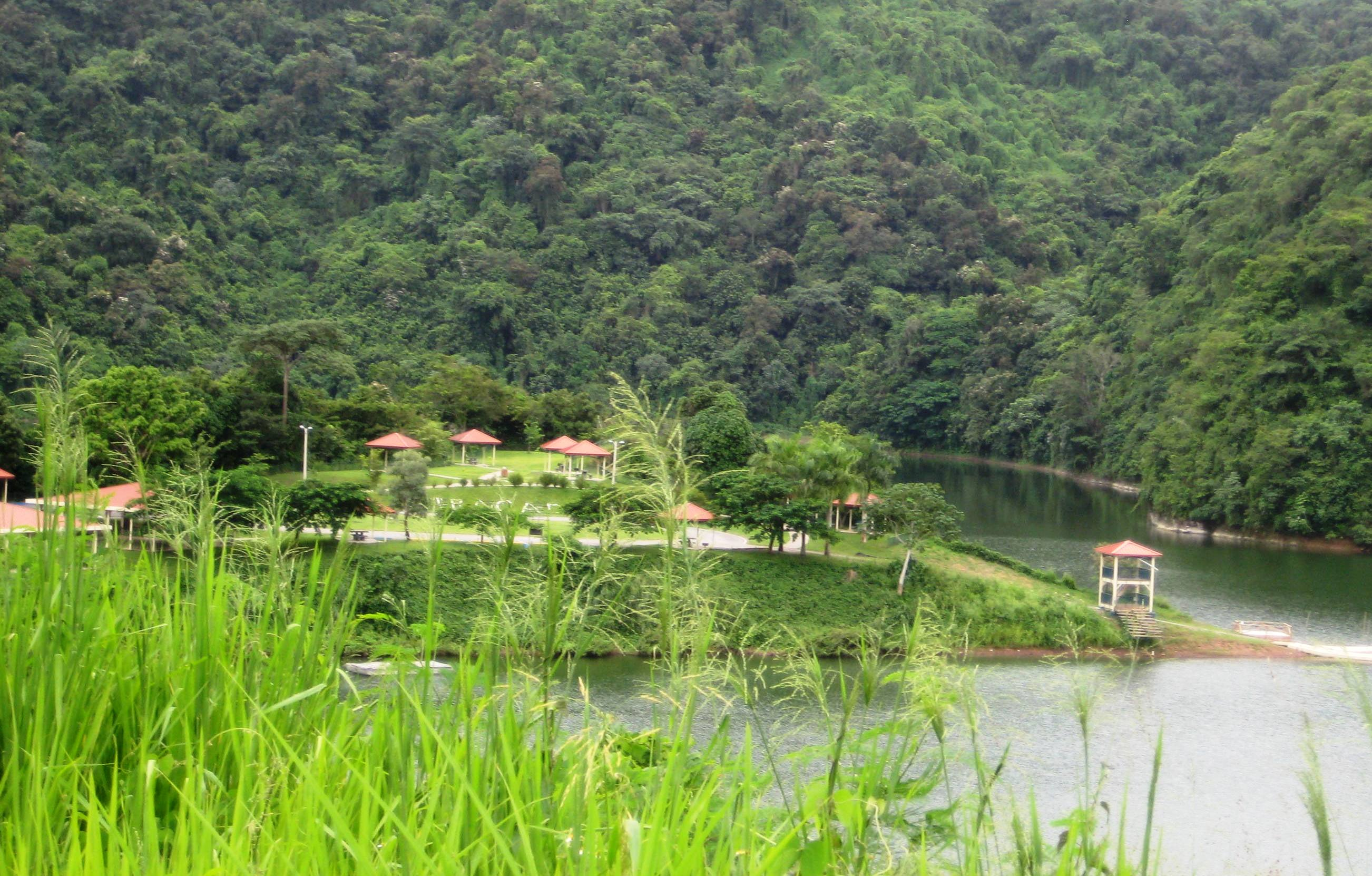
Parque Cerrillos

In 1920 Maragüez had a population of 616 inhabitants. By 2000, the population of Maragüez had grown to only 754 persons, making it the fourth least populated barrio of the municipality after 80 years. At 142 persons per square mile, Maragüez is also the fourth least densely populated barrio in the municipality. The main road serving barrio Maragüez is PR-139.

In 2010, the population of Maragüez was 545 persons, and it had a density of 102.1 persons per square mile.

The highest point in Barrio Maragüez stands at 2,132 feet and is located at the extreme northeast tip of the barrio. Another notable land feature is the Cerro Santo Domingo which stands at 2,004 feet.

Historical population
| Census | Pop. | Note | %± |
|---|---|---|---|
| 1900 | 1,756 | | — |
| 1910 | 1,752 | | −0.2% |
| 1920 | 1,643 | | −6.2% |
| 1930 | 1,671 | | 1.7% |
| 1940 | 1,717 | | 2.8% |
| 1950 | 1,642 | | −4.4% |
| 1960 | 1,674 | | 1.9% |
| 1970 | 1,747 | | 4.4% |
| 1980 | 1,947 | | 11.4% |
| 1990 | 781 | | −59.9% |
| 2000 | 754 | | −3.5% |
| 2010 | 545 | | −27.7% |
U.S. Decennial Census; 1899 (shown as 1900) 1910-1930; 1930-1950 1960 1980-2000 2010

== Landmarks ==
The Cerrillos Dam over Río Cerrillos is located in barrio Maraguez. Cerrillos Lake is located in Barrio Maragüez.

== See also ==
- List of communities in Puerto Rico
