= Jacaguas River =

River of Puerto Rico

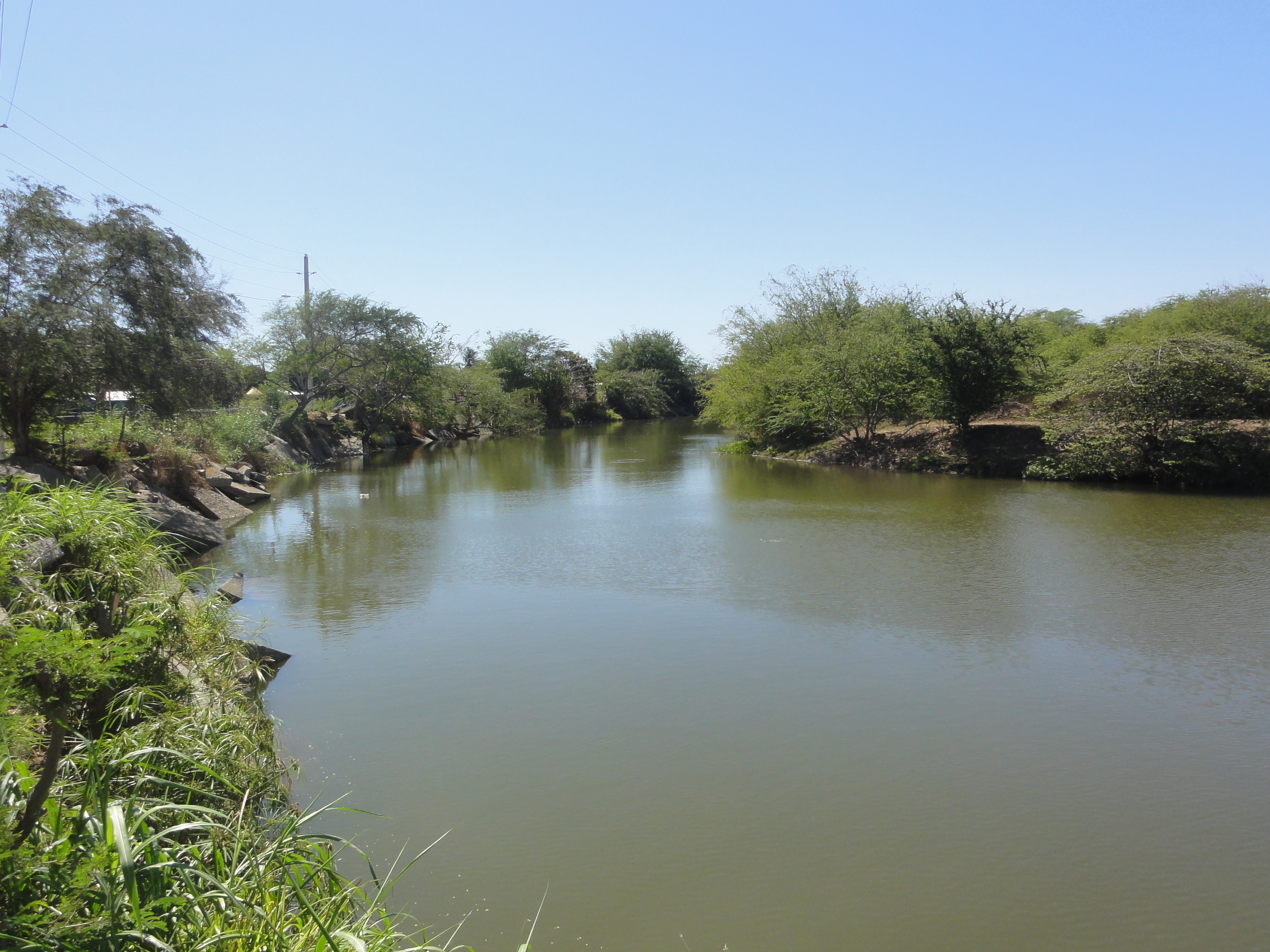
- Jacaguas River, as seen from barrio Capitanejo, Juana Díaz, some 100 feet before it empties into the Caribbean Sea

- Location of mouth

Location
- Commonwealth: Puerto Rico

Physical characteristics
- Source
  - location: Villalba
  - elevation: 2,099 feet (640 m)
- Mouth
  - location: Caribbean Sea
  - coordinates: 17.9738553°N 66.5393380°W
  - elevation: 0 feet (0 m)
- Length: 24.68 miles (39.72 km)
- Basin size: 59.85 sq mi (155.0 km^{2})
- Discharge
  - average: 37,000 cu ft/s (1,000 m^{3}/s)

Basin features
- Progression: Juana Diaz, Ponce
- River system: Jacaguas River
- Tributaries
  - left: Quebrada Jaguayes; Quebrada Chorrera
  - right: Quebrada Guanabana

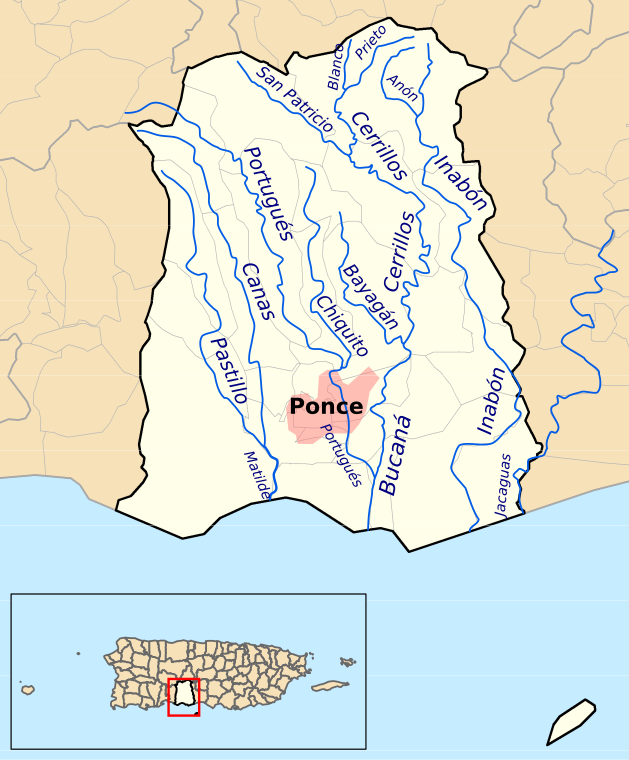
Map showing the location of Río Jacaguas among the other rivers in the municipality. The area in pink represents the urban zone of the city

Jacaguas River (Spanish: Río Jacaguas) is a river in the southern coast of Puerto Rico. It originates in the municipality of Villalba, flowing from north to south through municipalities of Ponce and Juana Díaz, draining into the Caribbean Sea east of the city of Ponce. One of the 14 rivers that flow through the municipality of Ponce, it is also its longest, at 39.72 kilometers (24.68 mi). The river has a discharge of 37,000 ft^{3}/second, making it also the one with the greatest discharge.

== Origin and course ==
Jacaguas has its origin in the southern foothills of the Cordillera Central, in the municipality of Villalba, Puerto Rico, on the boundary between barrio Vacas and barrio Hato Puerco Arriba, at an altitude of approximately 2,099 feet (640 m) above sea level. It crosses the municipalities of Villalba and Juana Díaz, where it forms the Guayabal Lake, before approaching the municipality of Ponce where it becomes the municipal boundary between Ponce and Juana Díaz throughout most of the rest its trajectory. From there it empties into the Caribbean Sea.

== See also ==
- List of rivers of Puerto Rico
- List of rivers of Ponce
