= Jauca =

Barrio of Jayuya, Puerto Rico

- Barrio
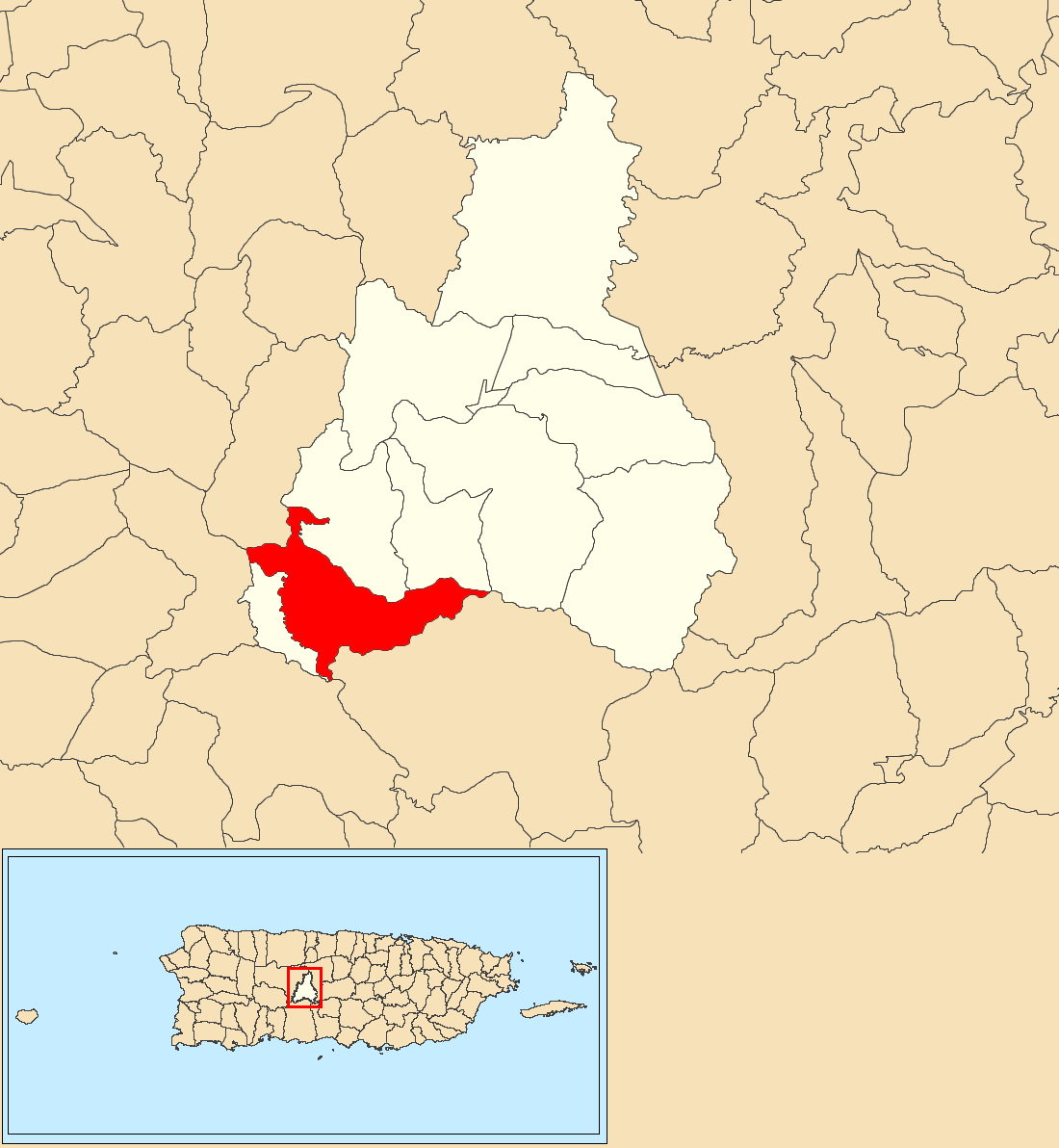
- Location of Jauca within the municipality of Jayuya shown in red

- Location of Puerto Rico
- Coordinates: 18°10′11″N 66°37′39″W
- Commonwealth: Puerto Rico
- Municipality: Jayuya

Area
  - Total: 3.71 sq mi (9.6 km^{2})
  - Land: 3.71 sq mi (9.6 km^{2})
  - Water: 0.00 sq mi (0 km^{2})
- Elevation: 2,539 ft (774 m)

Population (2010)
  - Total: 116
  - Density: 31.3/sq mi (12.1/km^{2})
- Source: 2010 Census
- Time zone: UTC−4 (AST)
- ZIP Code: 00664
- Area code: 787/939

Jauca is a barrio in the municipality of Jayuya, Puerto Rico. Its population in 2010 was 116. In 1948, Jauca was established from part of what was Jayuya Arriba (Jayuya barrio-pueblo).

Historical population
| Census | Pop. | Note | %± |
|---|---|---|---|
| 1950 | 236 | | — |
| 1960 | 246 | | 4.2% |
| 1970 | 130 | | −47.2% |
| 1980 | 165 | | 26.9% |
| 1990 | 264 | | 60.0% |
| 2000 | 211 | | −20.1% |
| 2010 | 116 | | −45.0% |
U.S. Decennial Census; 1950 1980-2000 2010

== See also ==
- List of communities in Puerto Rico
