= Bucaná River =

River of Puerto Rico

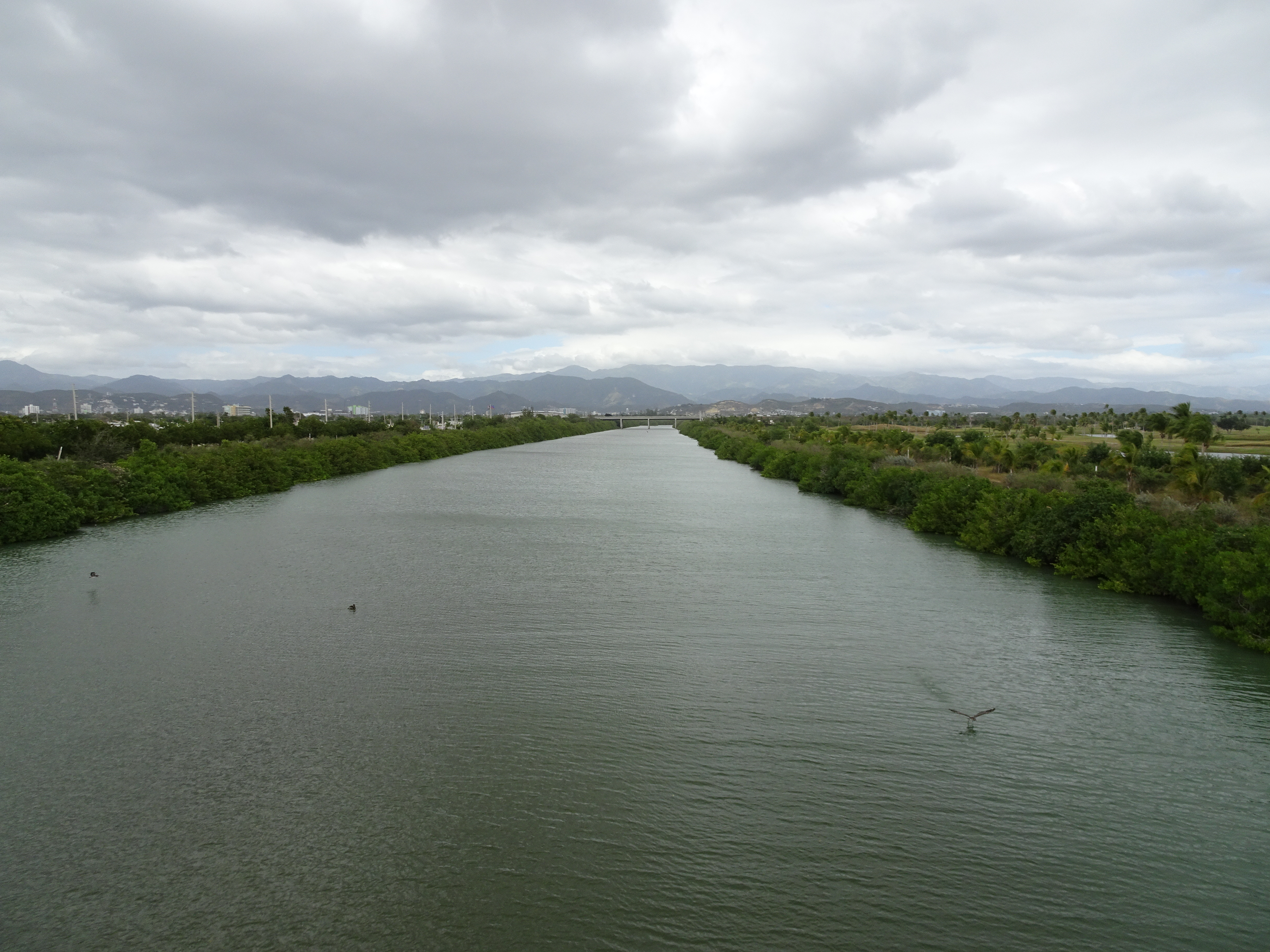
- Río Bucaná, looking north, from Puente de la Avenida Caribe, Barrio Playa, Ponce
- Native name: Río Bucaná (Spanish)

Location
- Commonwealth: Puerto Rico
- Municipality: Ponce

Physical characteristics
- Source
  - location: Barrio Machuelo Arriba
  - coordinates: 17.9685786°N 66.5998946°W
  - elevation: 115 feet (35 m)
- Mouth
  - location: Barrio Playa, Caribbean Sea
  - elevation: 0 feet (0 m) (Caribbean Sea)
- Length: 5.69 mi (9.16 km)
- Basin size: 28.45 mi^{2} (73.7 km^{2})

Basin features
- Progression: Machuelo Abajo; Sabanetas; Bucaná; Playa (Ponce)
- River system: Río Bucaná
- Tributaries
  - left: Rio Portugues
  - right: Rio Cerrillos

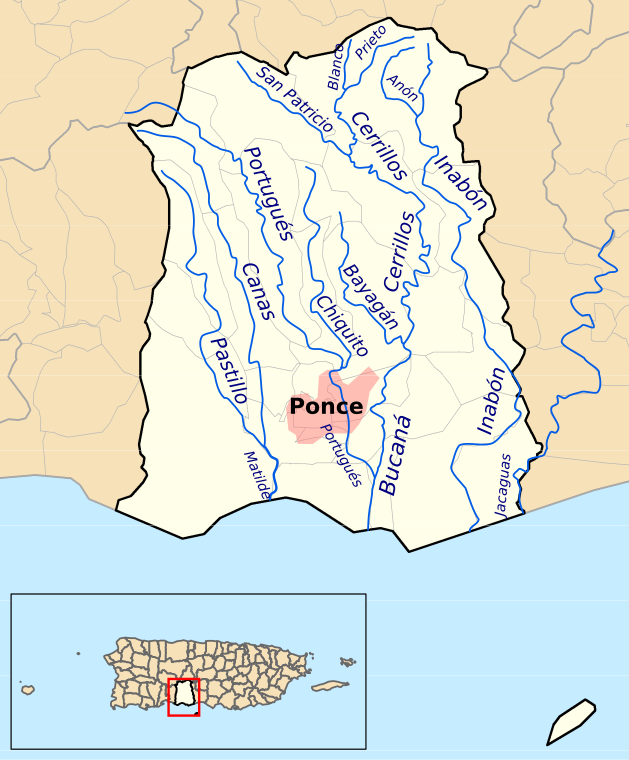
Map showing the location of Río Bucaná among the other rivers in the municipality. The area in pink represents the urban zone of the city

Bucaná River (Spanish: Río Bucaná) is a river in the municipality of Ponce, Puerto Rico. Río Bucaná has its origin in barrio Machuelo Arriba where it forms at an altitude of 115 feet (35 m). It forms from the confluence of Río Cerrillos and Río Bayagán.^{[note a]} It is also fed by Río Portugues during its southernly run. Río Bucaná used to run for some 29.5 kilometers (18.3 mi) prior to canalization and other diversion work by the U.S. Army Corps of Engineers. It now runs for 5.89 miles (9.48 km) to drain into the Caribbean Sea. This river is one of the 14 rivers in the municipality.

== Tributaries ==
Río Bucaná is formed in barrio Machuelo Arriba by the confluence of the Bayagán and Cerrillos rivers. It has two tributaries, Río Portugues and Río Cerrillos.

== Course ==
Río Bucaná originates in Cordillera Central at Monte Jayuya and runs in a winding fashion to the south receiving feeds from Rio Jauca, Rio Bayagan and Quebrada Guayo. Río Bucaná is channelized from the point it enters the city of Ponce and until it is fed by Rio Portugues (a river that is also channelized) in Barrio Bucaná at the southern tip of Julio Enrique Monagas Family Park. The channelization project started in 1974 and was completed in 1997. It was a multimillion-dollar investment, with just the first phase costing $120 million. The river empties into the Caribbean Sea near La Guancha. A section of the river used to run alongside Route 14, near the former Hospital de Distrito (now Hospital San Lucas), but it has since been diverted.

The following table summarizes the course of Río Bucaná in terms of roads crossed. Roads are listed as the river flows from its origin at the confluence of Río Bayagán and Río Cerrillos rivers, located in Barrio Machuelo Arriba, north of the city of Ponce, to its emptying into the Caribbean Sea in Barrio Bucaná in the south (N/A = Data not available):

No.	Barrio	Road	Road's km marker	NBI ID	Bridge name (if any)	Direction (of bridge traffic)	Coordinates	Notes
1	Machuelo Arriba	PR-14 (Av. Tito Castro)	5.4	23051	Unnamed	Both	18°2′21.2994″N 66°34′56.604″W	0.2 km W of Walmart of Coto Laurel
2	Machuelo Abajo	PR-10	3.8	14331	Unnamed	NB	18°2′2.256″N 66°35′1.2114″W	PR-10 North ramp into PR-14 East, km 3.4
3	Machuelo Abajo	PR-10	3.8	24891	Unnamed	SB	18°2′1.7514″N 66°35′1.932″W	
4	Sabanetas	PR-1 (Av. La Ceiba)	125.0	12291	La Ceiba	WB	18°0′21.7434″N 66°35′34.4034″W	next to Ponce Candy Industries
5	Sabanetas	PR-1 (Av. La Ceiba)	125.0	12291	La Ceiba	EB	18°0′21.24″N 66°35′34.5474″W	next to Ponce Candy Industries
6	Bucaná	PR-52	103.7	23351	Unnamed	WB	17°59′8.3394″N 66°35′51.5034″W	
7	Bucaná	PR-52	103.7	23351	Unnamed	EB	17°59′7.7274″N 66°35′51.5034″W	
8	Playa	Avenida Caribe	not marked	N/A	Unnamed	Both	17°58′30.8994″N 66°35′56.364″W	0.25 km NE of Hotel Ponce Hilton

== Uses ==
Río Bucaná is largely used for irrigation of crops on the southern plains of Puerto Rico located east of the city of Ponce.

== See also ==
- List of rivers of Puerto Rico
- List of rivers of Ponce

== Notes ==
1.One reliable source, (Puerto Rico Department of Environmental Resources) dated February 2007, states that this river forms from the confluence of Río Cerrillos and Río Bayagán. However, another reliable source, (Puerto Rico Office of Management and Budget) not dated but using data with dates that fluctuate between 2001 and 2010, shows the river forms from various minor streams, and that Río Cerrillos is a feeder river to Río Bucaná. In this article we are using the first source as the most reliable. Still, given that the U.S. Corps of Engineers has been working in redirecting and canalizing Río Bucaná, the reader is advised that the actual origin of the current river may be one of the two stated above or may well be different yet.
