= Puerto Rico Highway 143 =

Highway in Puerto Rico

Highway 143
- Ruta 143

Route information
- Maintained by Puerto Rico DTPW
- Length: 58.7 km (36.5 mi)
- Existed: 1953–present

Major junctions
- West end: PR-123 in Saltillo
- PR-10 in Saltillo; PR-503 in Consejo; PR-140 in San Patricio–Pica–Consejo; PR-139 in Jauca–Anón; PR-511 in Jauca–Anón; PR-149 in Ala de la Piedra–Villalba Arriba; PR-151 in Caonillas Arriba; PR-155 in Bermejales–Bauta Arriba–Pedro García; PR-723 in Helechal–Hayales; PR-152R in Helechal
- East end: PR-162 in Helechal

Location
- Country: United States
- Territory: Puerto Rico
- Municipalities: Adjuntas, Utuado, Ponce, Jayuya, Juana Díaz, Orocovis, Villalba, Coamo, Barranquitas

Highway system
- Roads in Puerto Rico; List
← PR-142	→ PR-144

Puerto Rico Highway 143 (PR-143) is a secondary highway that connects the town of Adjuntas to the town of Barranquitas. This roads extends from PR-123 to PR-162 along the Cordillera Central.

== Route description ==
Heading east from Adjuntas, PR-143 runs through the northern border of the municipality of Ponce, before reaching Orocovis and then Barranquitas.

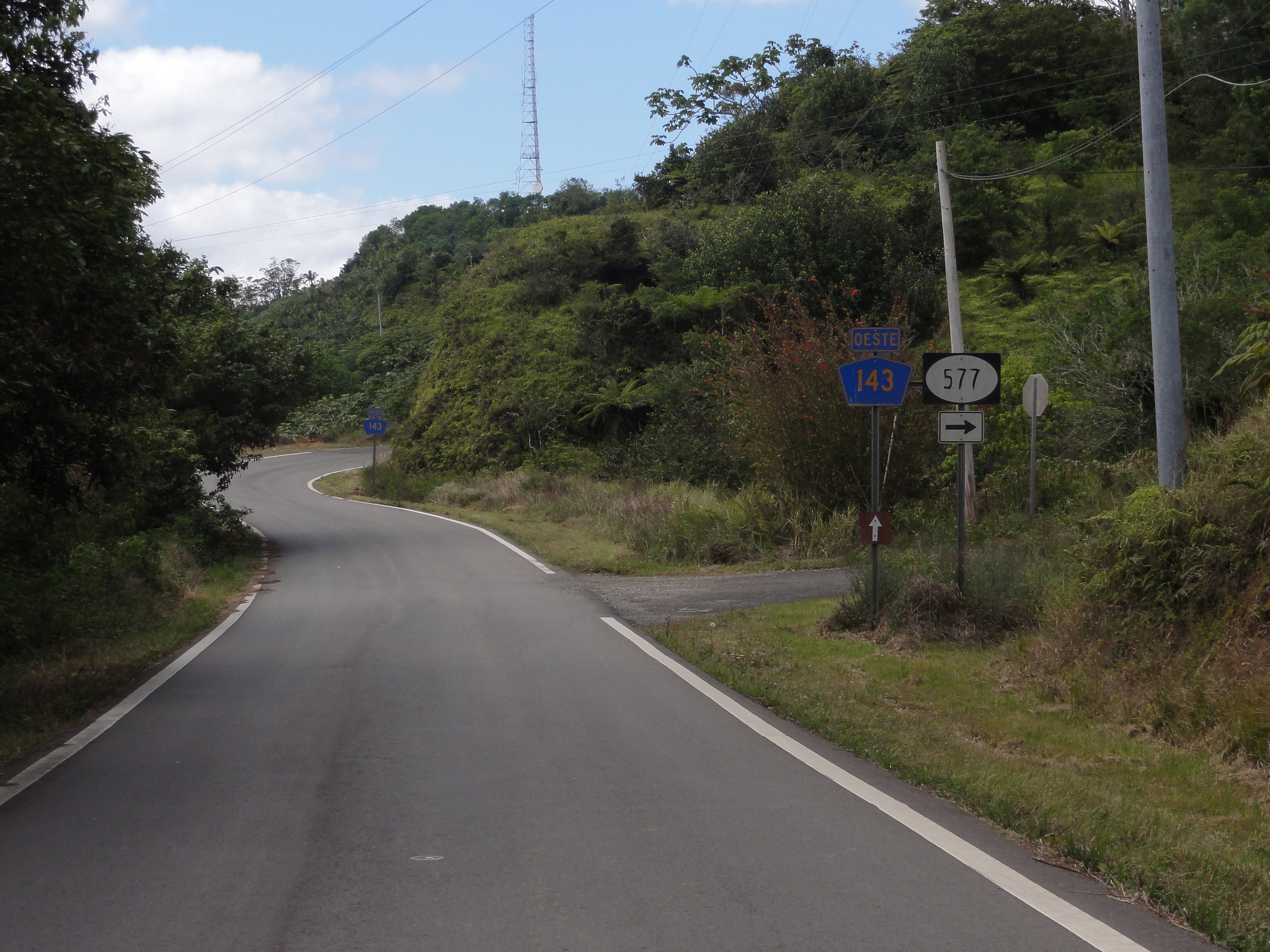
A scene on PR-143 westbound in Barrio Anón, Ponce, Puerto Rico

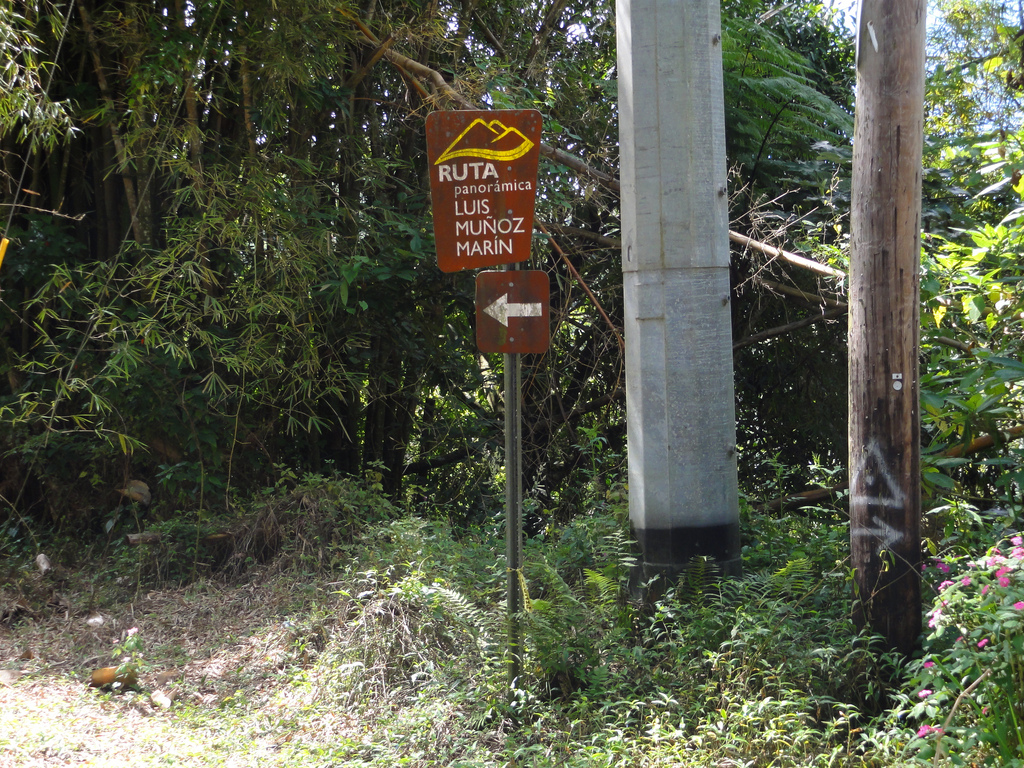
A sign on westbound PR-143 in Barrio Ala de la Piedra, Orocovis, Puerto Rico, pointing out Ruta Panorámica near PR-149

=== Tourist attractions ===
The road is a major part of Puerto Rico's Panoramic Route, being the major middle component of such route. It crosses Toro Negro State Forest, and leads to such landmarks as Cerro de Punta and Lago El Guineo lake. The Orocovis-Villalba lookout and Cerro Maravilla as well as a number of local restaurants can be found along the way.

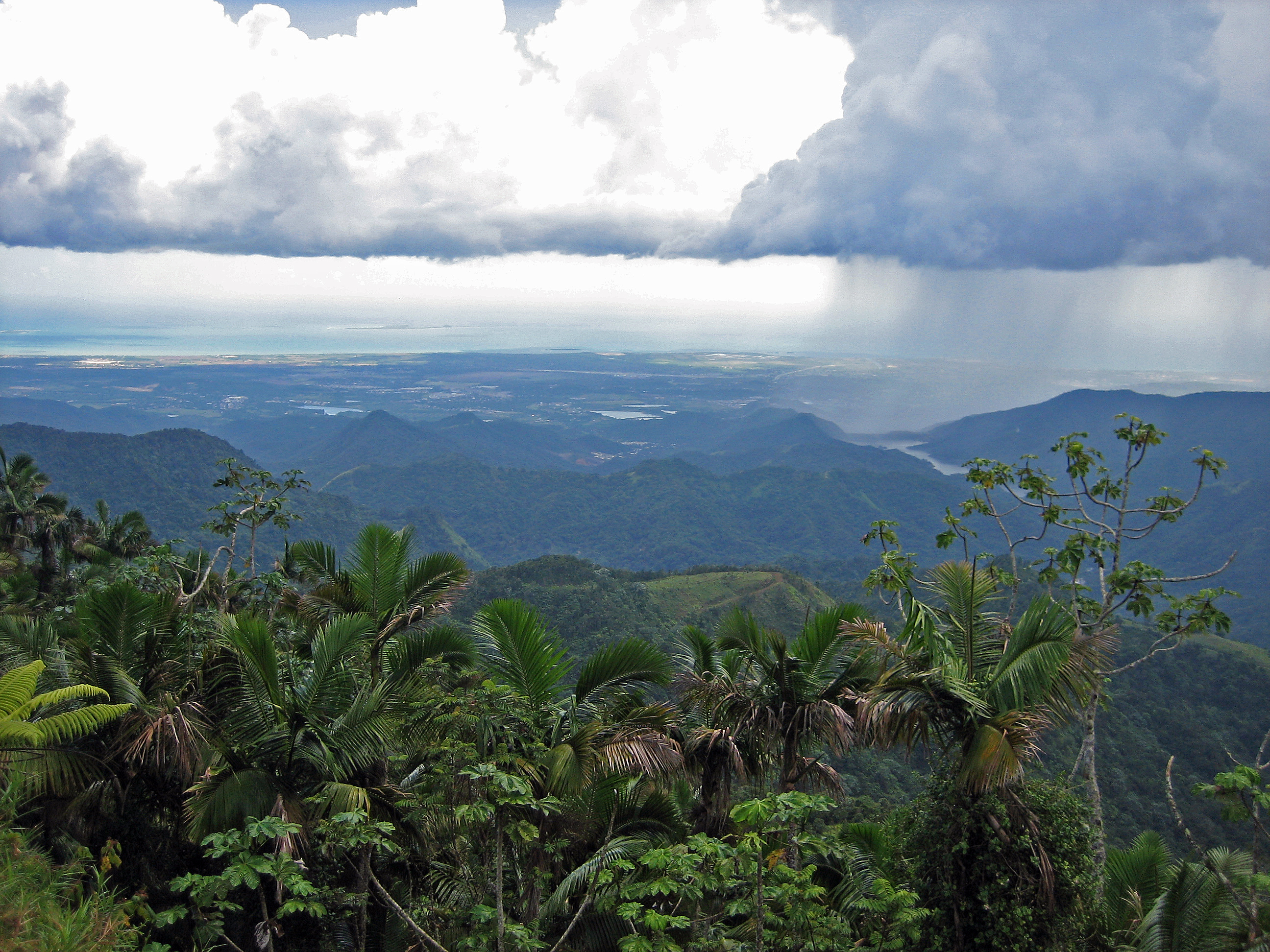
View of the southern coast of Puerto Rico from PR-143

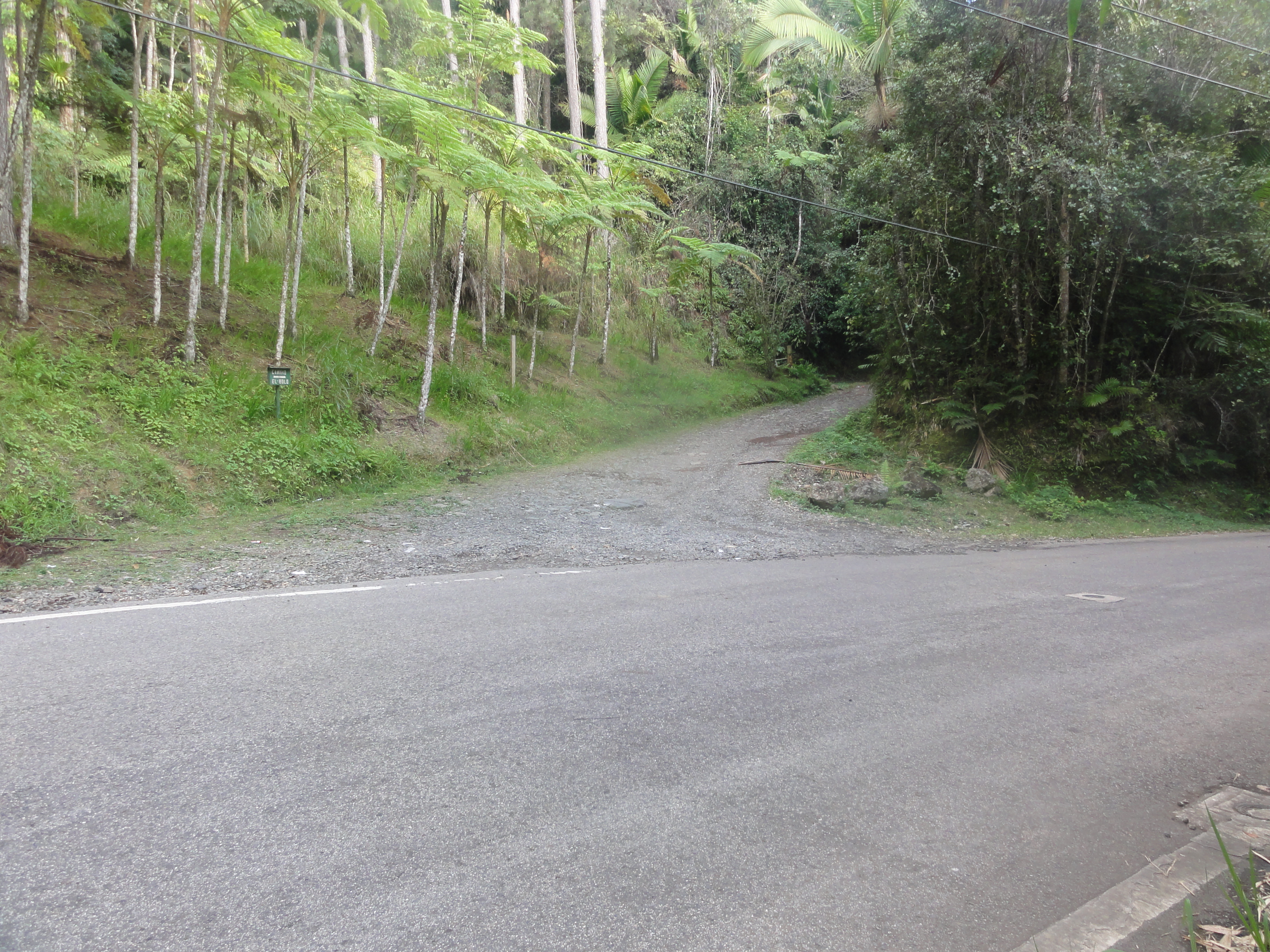
North entrance of Camino El Bolo trail of Toro Negro State Forest at PR-143 in Orocovis

=== Route features ===
No.	km	Feature	Direction	Notes
0	0.0	PR-10	North and South	To Ponce (SB) or to Adjuntas (NB)
1	3.3	PR-521	North	To Jayuya
2	3.9	PR-503 (also to PR-505)	South	To Ponce
3	7.3	PR-140	North	To Jayuya
4	7.9	San Patricio Elementary School	North	-
5	11.6	PR-139	South	To Ponce
6	12.4	PR-511	South	To Ponce (blocked by landslides as of 01/15)
7	16.7	Cerro de Punta	North	Tallest mountain in PR
8	18.2	Monte Jayuya	North	Radio/TV Towers
9	21.2	PR-577	North	Cerro Maravilla
10	28.1	PR-149	South	To Villalba
11	28.5	PR-149 and sign to Toro Negro State Forest	North	To Ciales
12	32.4	PR DRNA Toro Negro State Forest Office	North	-
13	39.6	Mirador Villaba-Orocovis (Scenic Lookout)	South	-

== Major intersections ==
Municipality	Location	km	mi	Destinations	Notes
Adjuntas	Saltillo	0.0	0.0	PR-123 – Adjuntas, Ponce	Western terminus of PR-143; western terminus of the Ruta Panorámica concurrency; the Ruta Panorámica continues toward Adjuntas
Adjuntas	Saltillo	0.5– 0.6	0.31– 0.37	PR-10 (Carretera Rigoberto "Pucho" Ramos Aquino) – Adjuntas, Ponce	
Adjuntas	Portugués	3.4	2.1	PR-521 – Vegas Arriba	
Utuado	Consejo	3.9	2.4	PR-503 south (Carretera David Medina Feliciano) – Ponce	
Ponce–Jayuya– Utuado municipal tripoint	San Patricio–Pica– Consejo tripoint	7.4	4.6	PR-140 north – Jayuya	
Jayuya–Ponce municipal line	Jauca–Anón line	11.8	7.3	PR-139 – Ponce	
Jayuya–Ponce municipal line	Jauca–Anón line	12.7	7.9	PR-511 – Ponce	Blocked by landslides as of January 2015
Ponce	Anón	21.9	13.6	PR-577 – Cerro Maravilla	
Juana Díaz	No major junctions				
Orocovis–Villalba municipal line	Ala de la Piedra–Villalba Arriba line	29.0 45.4 (Note: Kilometer markers represent the distance along PR-149 rather than PR-143.)	18.0 28.2	PR-149 (Carretera José Joaquín Rodríguez Rodríguez) – Villalba	Southern terminus of PR-149 concurrency
Orocovis	Ala de la Piedra	44.8 29.1	27.8 18.1	PR-149 (Carretera José Joaquín Rodríguez Rodríguez) – Ciales, Jayuya	Northern terminus of PR-149 concurrency
Orocovis	Bauta Abajo	34.0	21.1	PR-564 – Bauta Abajo	
Orocovis	Bauta Abajo	39.3	24.4	PR-590 – Bauta Abajo	
Villalba	Caonillas Arriba	41.5– 41.6	25.8– 25.8	PR-151 south – Villalba	
Orocovis–Coamo municipal line	Bermejales–Pedro García line	46.4	28.8	PR-595 – Pedro García	
Orocovis–Coamo municipal line	Bermejales–Bauta Arriba– Pedro García tripoint	46.7	29.0	PR-155 – Coamo, Orocovis	
Coamo	Hayales	51.1	31.8	PR-569 – Orocovis, Sabana	
Coamo–Barranquitas municipal line	Hayales–Palo Hincado line	52.5	32.6	PR-720 – Palo Hincado	
Coamo–Barranquitas municipal line	Hayales–Helechal line	54.1	33.6	PR-723 (Ruta Panorámica) – Aibonito, Pulguillas	Eastern terminus of the Ruta Panorámica concurrency; the Ruta Panorámica continues toward Aibonito
Barranquitas	Helechal	58.1	36.1	PR-152R north (Avenida Ingeniero José Zayas Green) – Barranquitas	
Barranquitas	Helechal	58.7	36.5	PR-162 – Barranquitas, Aibonito	Eastern terminus of PR-143
1.000 mi = 1.609 km; 1.000 km = 0.621 mi: Closed/former; Concurrency terminus

== See also ==
- List of highways in Ponce, Puerto Rico
- 1953 Puerto Rico highway renumbering
