= Puerto Rico Highway 723 =

Highway in Puerto Rico

Highway 723
- Ruta 723

Route information
- Maintained by Puerto Rico DTPW
- Length: 9.6 km (6.0 mi)
- Existed: 1953–present

Major junctions
- West end: PR-143 in Helechal–Hayales
- PR-558 in Pulguillas
- East end: PR-14 in Asomante–Pasto

Location
- Country: United States
- Territory: Puerto Rico
- Municipalities: Coamo, Aibonito

Highway system
- Roads in Puerto Rico; List
← PR-722	→ PR-735

Puerto Rico Highway 723 (PR-723) is a rural road that goes from the municipality of Aibonito to southern Barranquitas via northeastern Coamo, Puerto Rico. With a length of 9.6 kilometers (6.0 mi), it begins at its intersection with PR-14 on the Pasto–Asomante line, passing through Pulguillas barrio until its end at its junction with PR-143 on the Coamo–Barranquitas municipal line.

== Route description ==
This highway consists of two lanes in all of the entire length, one per direction, due to its rural characteristics. It is also part of the Ruta Panorámica, offering scenic views of southern Puerto Rico and the Cordillera Central. Near this highway, the Battle of Asomante took place, where Spanish and American troops met forces as part of the Spanish–American War of 1898.

Puerto Rico Highway 723 by municipality

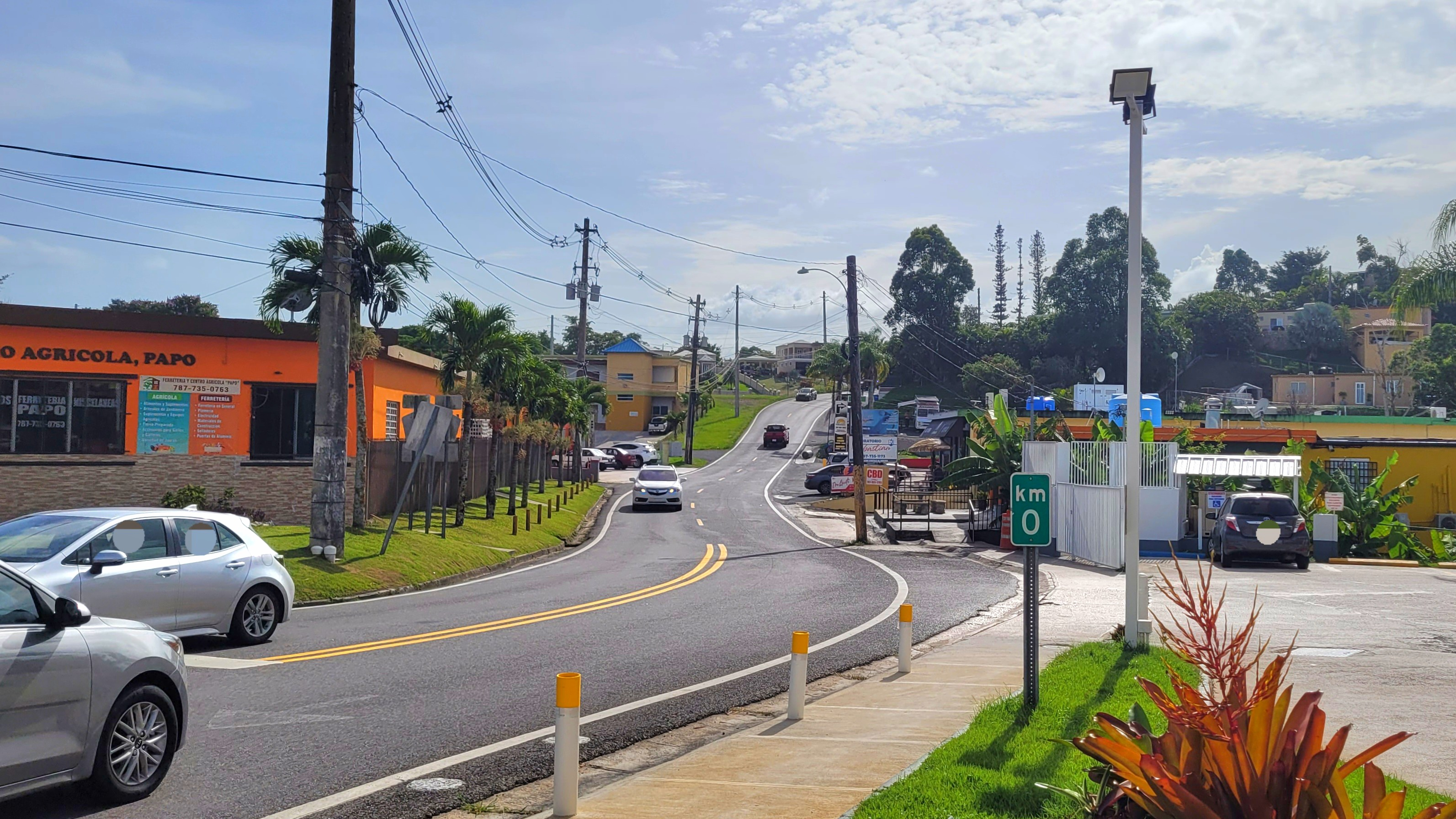
Eastern terminus at PR-14 junction in Asomante, Aibonito, looking west

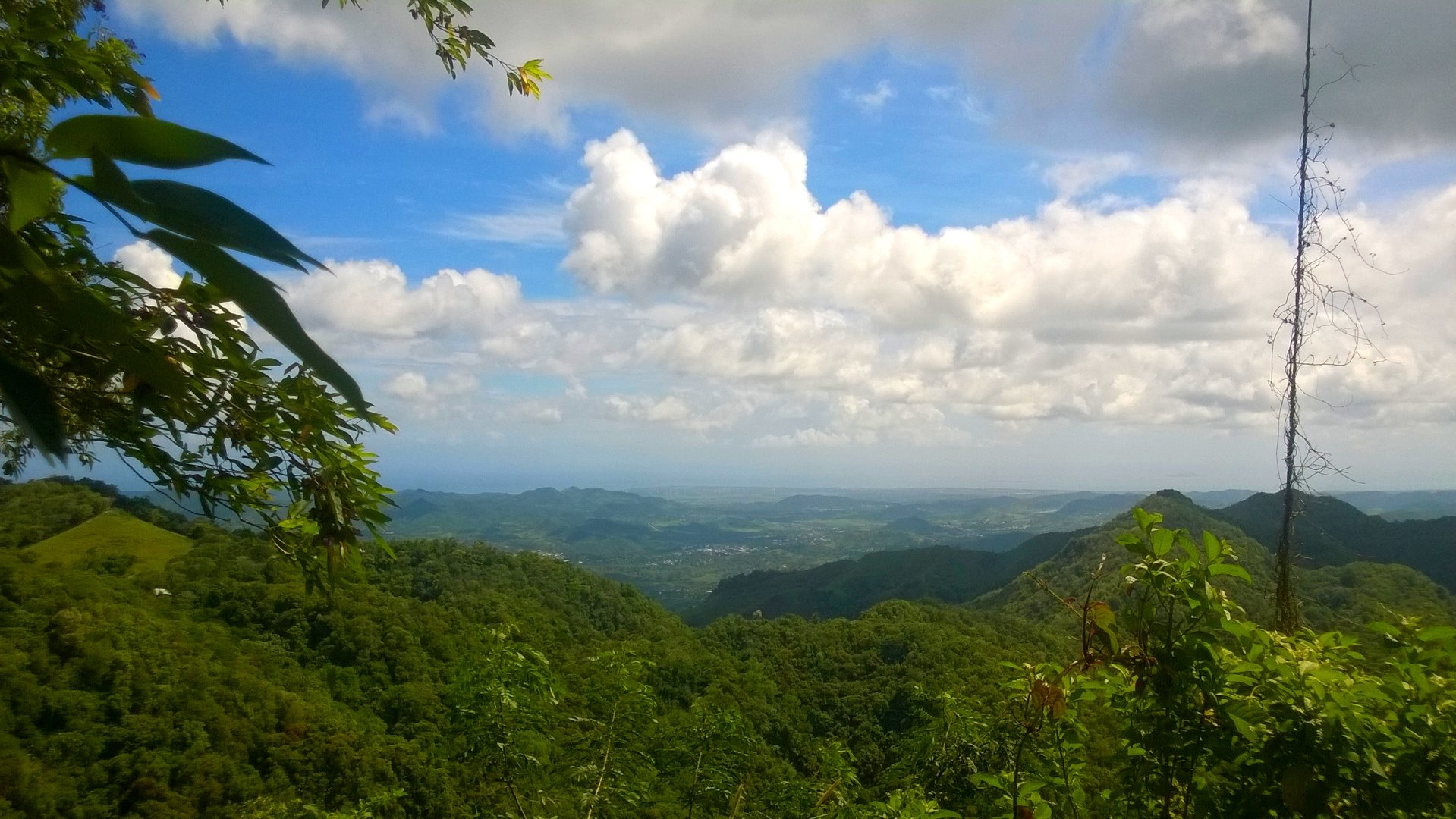
Scenic view in Pulguillas, Coamo, looking south

=== Communities served ===
The following barrios are located along Puerto Rico Highway 723:

- Asomante, from PR-14 in Aibonito to the Coamo municipal limit
- Pulguillas, from the Aibonito municipal limit to the Hayales line
- Hayales, from the Pulguillas line to PR-143 on the Barranquitas municipal limit

== History ==
Prior to its numerical designation, PR-723 was only known as Carretera de Pulguillas. The current numerical designation corresponds to the 1953 Puerto Rico highway renumbering, a process implemented by the Puerto Rico Department of Transportation and Public Works (Spanish: Departamento de Transportación y Obras Públicas) that increased the insular highway network to connect existing routes with different locations around Puerto Rico.

== Major intersections ==
Municipality	Location	km	mi	Destinations	Notes
Barranquitas–Coamo municipal line	Helechal–Hayales line	9.6	6.0	PR-143 – Barranquitas, Adjuntas	Western terminus of PR-723; the Ruta Panorámica continues toward Orocovis
Coamo	Pulguillas	6.3	3.9	PR-558 – Pulguillas	
Aibonito	Asomante–Pasto line	0.0	0.0	PR-14 (Carretera Central) – Aibonito, Coamo	Eastern terminus of PR-723; western terminus of the Carretera Central concurrency; the Ruta Panorámica continues toward Aibonito; the Carretera Central continues toward Coamo
1.000 mi = 1.609 km; 1.000 km = 0.621 mi: Concurrency terminus
