= Cueva La Espiral =

- U.S. National Register of Historic Places
- Location: Address restricted in Bauta Abajo, Orocovis, Puerto Rico
- MPS: Prehistoric Rock Art of Puerto Rico MPS
- NRHP reference No.: 11000673
- Added to NRHP: September 20, 2011

La Espiral Cave (Spanish: Cueva La Espiral) is a cave and archaeological site located in the Bauta Abajo barrio in the municipality of Orocovis, Puerto Rico.

The archaeological site consists of two outcrops containing approximately 170 rock art images dating from A.D. 600–1500. The site was listed in the National Register of Historic Places on September 20, 2011.
