= Alejandro González Malavé =

Puerto Rican law enforcement officer

- Born: May 20, 1957; San Juan, Puerto Rico
- Died: April 29, 1986 (aged 28); Bayamón, Puerto Rico
- Police career
- Country: Puerto Rico
- Department: Puerto Rico Police
- Service years: 1979–1986

Alejandro González Malavé (May 20, 1957 – April 29, 1986) was a Puerto Rican undercover agent who gained infamy with the Cerro Maravilla case scandal. In 1973, still a High School student, Malavé was recruited as an undercover agent.

González came from a poor family. He grew up with his parents and a younger brother in the Monacillos neighborhood of Río Piedras, Puerto Rico, an outspoken university political leader, joined the Puerto Rico Police in 1979, the same year he went to work undercover. He infiltrated an organization of radical pro independence students and was the driver when Carlos Soto Arriví and Arnaldo Darío Rosado were murdered during a police set up at Cerro Maravilla.

When the Cerro Maravilla inquest was televised all over Puerto Rico, González, one of the accused, gained widespread infamy all across the island. His face became a common sight on Puerto Rican newspaper covers, and he received constant air time on television, because he had to take the stand many times during the trial. Although the scandal played a role in squashing the reelection plans of Governor Carlos Romero Barceló, the alleged conspiracy was never proven. González was tried, but acquitted on all charges.

On the evening of April 29, 1986, just two months after his acquittal, González was assassinated in front of his mother's house in Bayamón. He received three gunshot wounds while his mother was slightly injured. A few hours later, a group calling itself the "Volunteer Organization for the Revolution" called local news agencies claiming responsibility. In their statements they swore to kill, "one by one", all the police officers involved in the deaths in Cerro Maravilla.

== See also ==
- List of Puerto Ricans
