= Puerto Rico Highway 577 =

Highway in Puerto Rico

Highway 577
- Ruta 577
- PR-577 highlighted in red

Route information
- Maintained by Puerto Rico DTPW
- Length: 0.2 km (0.12 mi; 660 ft)

Major junctions
- South end: PR-143 in Anón
- North end: Cerro Maravilla in Anón–Saliente

Location
- Country: United States
- Territory: Puerto Rico
- Municipalities: Ponce

Highway system
- Roads in Puerto Rico; List
← PR-568	→ PR-578

Puerto Rico Highway 577 (PR-577) is a short tertiary mountainous state road that connects PR-143 (also known as Ruta Panorámica [Scenic Route] in this sector) to the Cerro Maravilla communications towers, in Barrio Anón, Ponce, Puerto Rico. The road's northern terminus is at the Cerro Maravilla communications towers atop the Cerro Maravilla mountain, and its southern terminus is at its intersection with PR-143.

== Route description ==
PR-577 is a short road, approximately one-quarter mile in length. The road's primary purpose is to provide access to the television, radio and telephone communications towers located at the top of the Cerro Maravilla mountain. The road is somewhat steep, but it is safe to climb it in an automobile. Care must be exercised, however, if using the road while raining. It is an asphalt road. The road is not a full two-lane road but, instead, as it is the case with many of Puerto Rico's mountain roads, it is approximately 1 and 1/2 lanes wide. As a result, if traveling this road in a vehicle, it is necessary to reduce the speed to almost a crawl when another vehicle is approaching in the opposite direction.

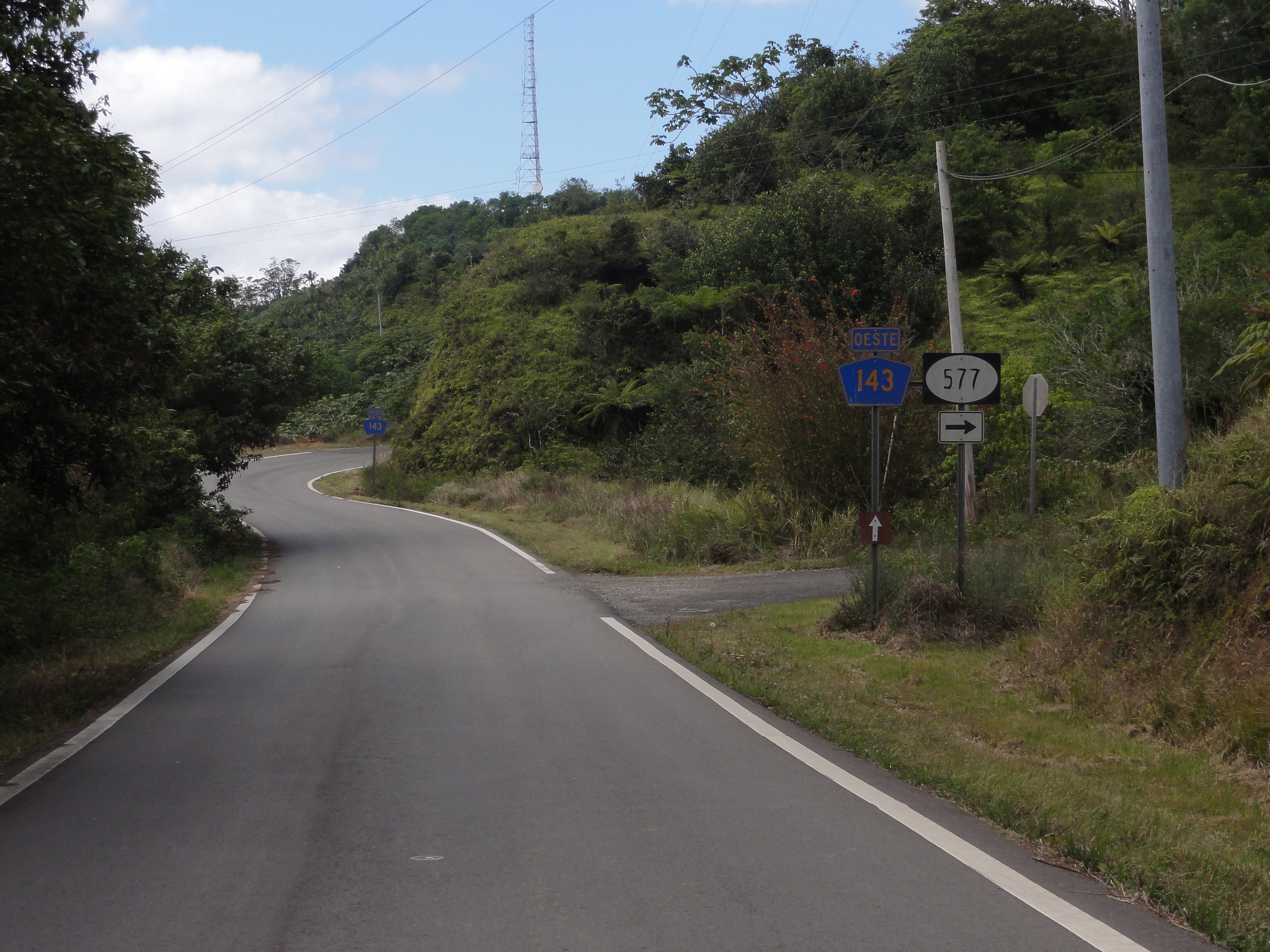
PR-143 (Ruta Panorámica) west in Barrio Anón, Ponce, approaching PR-577 on the right

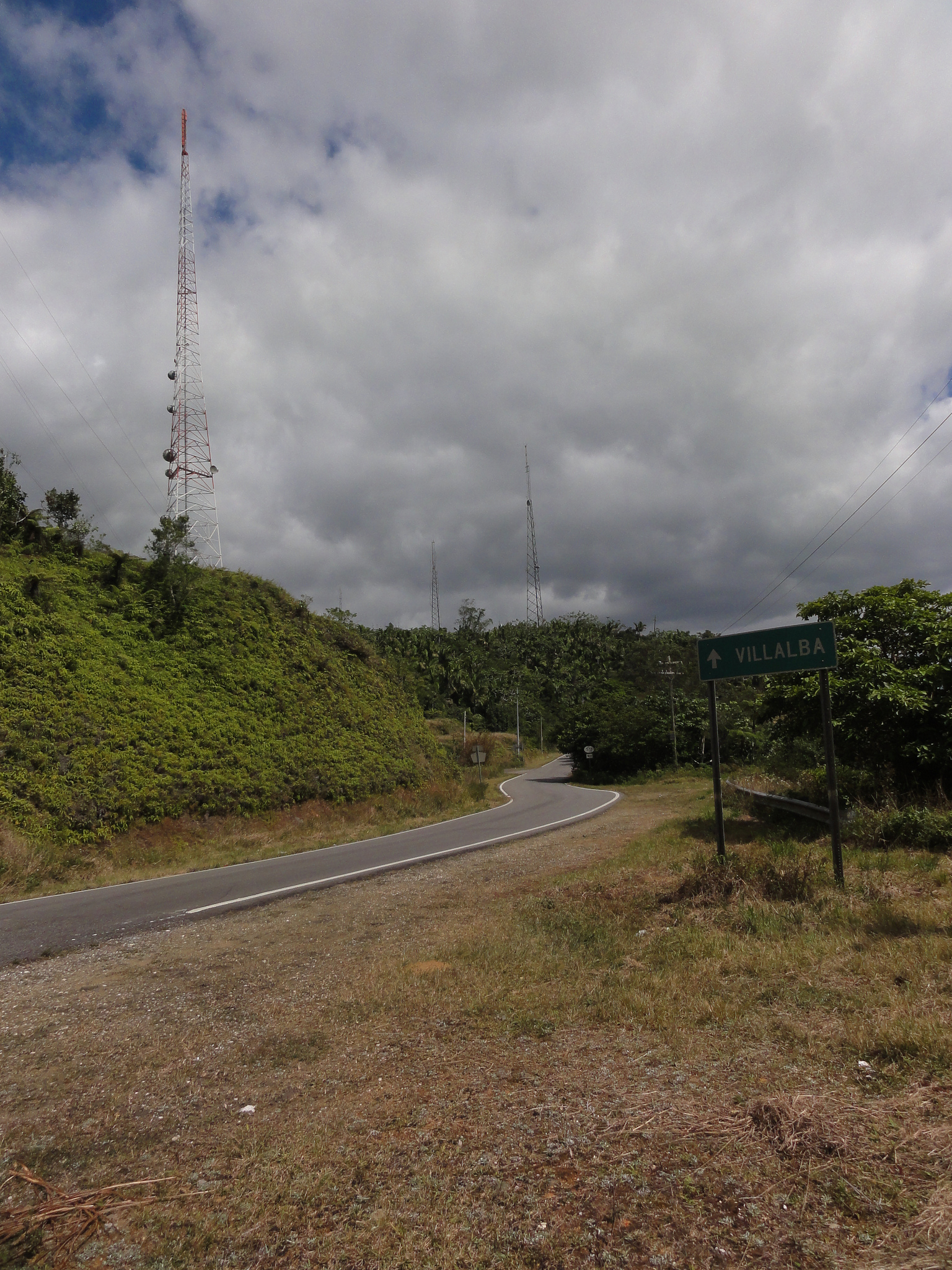
PR-143 (Ruta Panorámica) east in Barrio Anón, Ponce, approaching PR-577 (on the left), which leads to Cerro Maravilla. Note the white "PR-577" road sign barely visible on the right

=== Significance ===
The Cerro Maravilla mountain gained notoriety in Puerto Rico and internationally as the site where Puerto Rico Police ambushed two young Puerto Rican independence advocates in 1978, murdering both, in an incident now known as the Cerro Maravilla murders. The men, aged 18 and 23, had been lured to the place by an undercover police agent to attempt to destroy the communications towers in an effort to call attention to the incarceration of Puerto Rican political prisoners in the United States. The killing of the two men was covered up by the Puerto Rico Police and several high-level Puerto Rico government officials, and were not investigated diligently by the FBI, for which a later FBI director apologized.

== Major intersections ==
Municipality	Location	km	mi	Destinations	Notes
Ponce	Anón	0.0	0.0	PR-143 (Ruta Panorámica) – Adjuntas, Barranquitas	Southern terminus of PR-577
Ponce–Jayuya municipal line	Anón–Jauca line	0.2	0.12	Northern terminus of PR-577 at Cerro Maravilla; dead end road	
1.000 mi = 1.609 km; 1.000 km = 0.621 mi

== See also ==
- List of highways in Ponce, Puerto Rico
