= Cerro Maravilla =

Puerto Rico's fourth highest peak

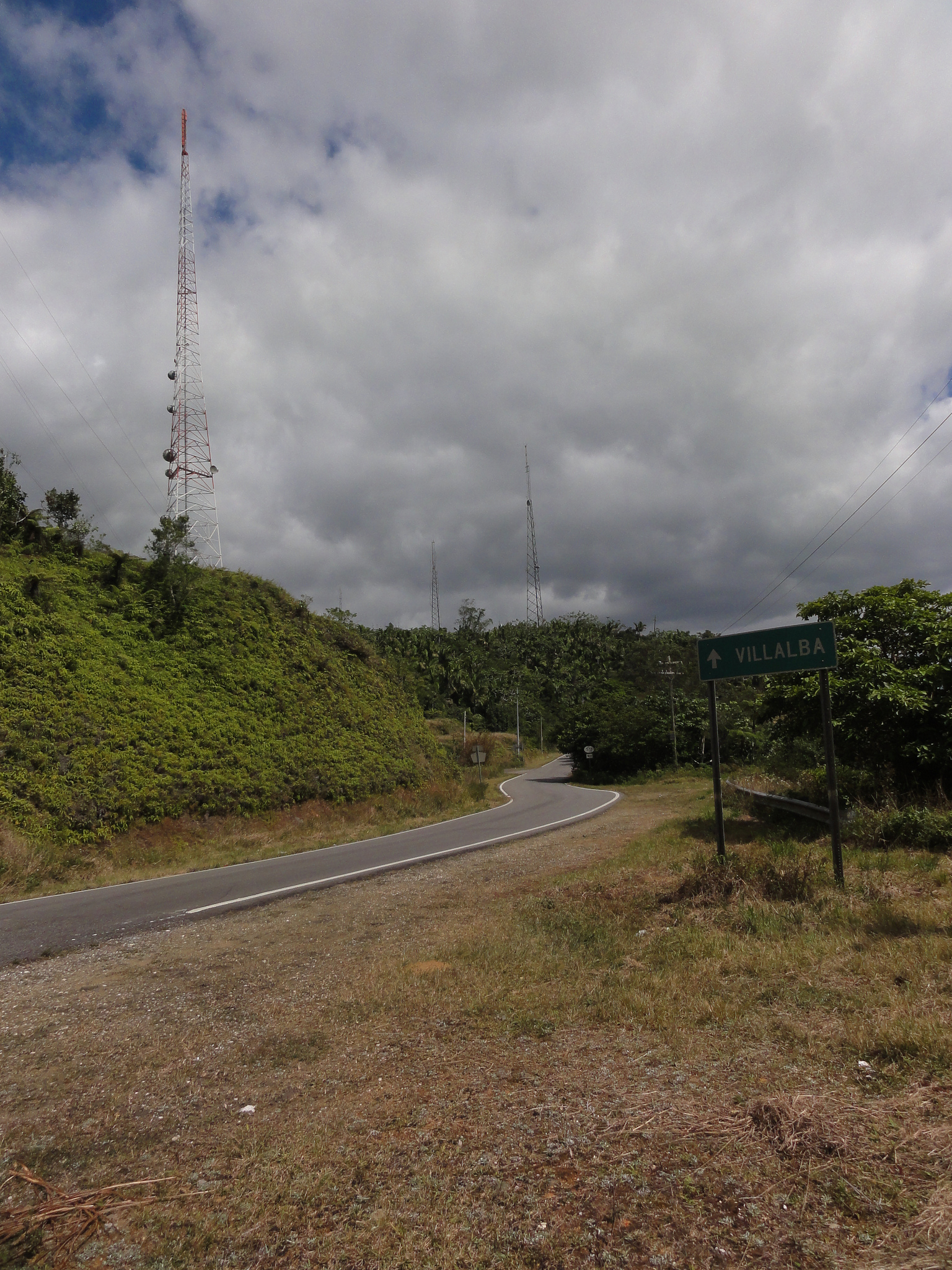
- Communications towers at Cerro Maravilla

Highest point
- Elevation: 3,953 ft (1,205 m)
- Coordinates: 18°09′11″N 66°33′15″W

Geography
- Location within Puerto Rico
- Location: Barrio Anón; Ponce, Puerto Rico
- Parent range: Cordillera Central

Climbing
- Easiest route: PR-143 (km 21.9) at PR-577; Barrio Anón; Ponce, Puerto Rico

Cerro Maravilla is Puerto Rico's fourth highest peak at 1,205 meters (3,953 ft). It is located on the northern edge Barrio Anón in Ponce, close to the border with the municipality Jayuya, and is part of the Cordillera Central (Central Mountain Range). It is known as El Cerro de los Mártires ("Mountain of the Martyrs") and characterized as the most infamous peak in Puerto Rico, due to the 1978 Cerro Maravilla murders which took place here.

== Location and access ==
The peak is located at the end of the 0.5 km-long Puerto Rico Highway 577, which is accessible via Puerto Rico Highway 143, traveling either westbound or eastbound. PR-143 is a secondary two-way, two-lane mountainous road that is relatively well traveled. The peak's coordinates are: 18°09′11″N 66°33′15″W.

The height of the mountain makes for some interesting sights. For example, on clear days both the northern and southern coasts of the island can be appreciated simultaneously. In the winter season, the air is crisp and the temperature at night will usually fluctuate between the 40s and 60s degrees Fahrenheit. The chirping of the familiar "coquis" is prominent after nightfall.

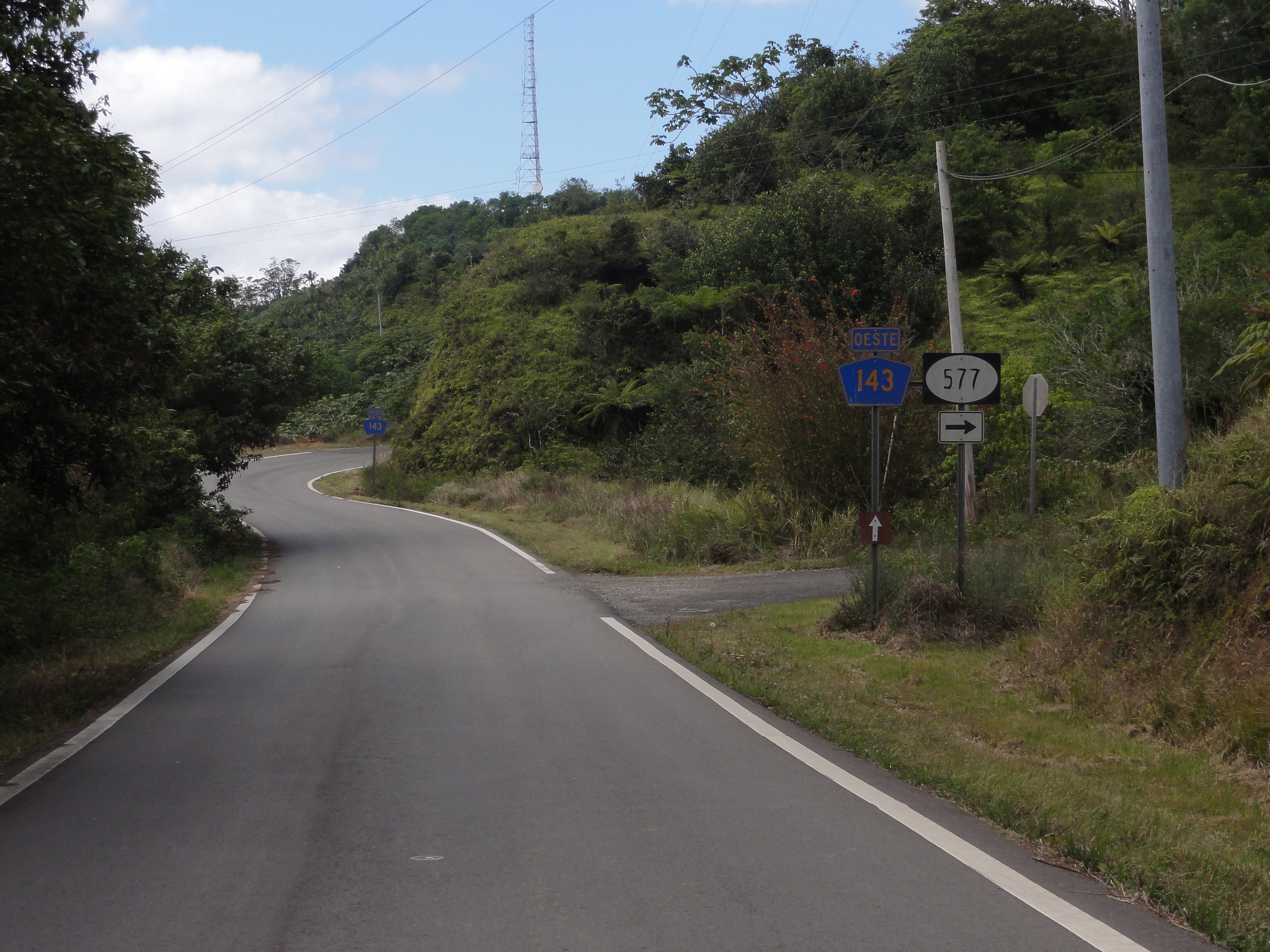
PR-143 Westbound approaching PR-577 which leads to Cerro Maravilla, in Barrio Anón, Ponce

== Cerro Maravilla incident ==
The peak might be best known for being the place where two Puerto Rico independence activists were slain on 25 July 1978 in a police ambush (see Cerro Maravilla murders.) This controversy has since turned the mountain into a meeting point for supporters of the independence of the Puerto Rican Commonwealth to gather annually to remember the murdered activists and condemn the current colonial status.

== Climate ==
Cerro Maravilla has a subtropical highland climate (Cfb) under the Köppen climate classification. The surrounding area over 1,000 meters (3,300 feet) is one of the few places in the island to have a true temperate climate. Although the temperature remains mild year round, night temperatures in winter may reach the mid 40s at times.

Climate data for Cerro Maravilla, Puerto Rico (1981-2010 normals, extremes 1969-2012)
Month	Jan	Feb	Mar	Apr	May	Jun	Jul	Aug	Sep	Oct	Nov	Dec	Year
Record high °F (°C)	85 (29)	87 (31)	81 (27)	82 (28)	85 (29)	90 (32)	87 (31)	85 (29)	88 (31)	85 (29)	88 (31)	83 (28)	90 (32)
Mean daily maximum °F (°C)	65.5 (18.6)	65.8 (18.8)	66.6 (19.2)	67.2 (19.6)	68.0 (20.0)	70.4 (21.3)	71.6 (22.0)	71.4 (21.9)	71.1 (21.7)	70.6 (21.4)	68.7 (20.4)	66.0 (18.9)	68.6 (20.3)
Daily mean °F (°C)	60.8 (16.0)	60.7 (15.9)	61.5 (16.4)	62.5 (16.9)	63.9 (17.7)	66.2 (19.0)	67.0 (19.4)	66.9 (19.4)	66.5 (19.2)	66.2 (19.0)	64.0 (17.8)	61.8 (16.6)	64.0 (17.8)
Mean daily minimum °F (°C)	56.0 (13.3)	55.7 (13.2)	56.4 (13.6)	57.9 (14.4)	59.8 (15.4)	62.0 (16.7)	62.3 (16.8)	62.4 (16.9)	61.8 (16.6)	61.7 (16.5)	59.3 (15.2)	57.6 (14.2)	59.4 (15.2)
Record low °F (°C)	43 (6)	40 (4)	43 (6)	41 (5)	45 (7)	51 (11)	52 (11)	52 (11)	52 (11)	52 (11)	51 (11)	40 (4)	40 (4)
Average precipitation inches (mm)	3.81 (97)	3.64 (92)	5.12 (130)	8.57 (218)	12.14 (308)	7.06 (179)	6.09 (155)	10.39 (264)	13.68 (347)	15.66 (398)	9.03 (229)	4.13 (105)	99.32 (2,522)
Average precipitation days (≥ 0.01 in)	11.8	11.2	11.7	14.1	16.4	11.8	11.4	15.2	17.6	20.0	15.0	12.0	168.2
Source: NOAA

== See also ==
- Cerro Maravilla incident
