= Cerro Maravilla murders =

1978 murder of two young Puerto Rican pro-independence activists

- Location: Ponce, Puerto Rico
- Date: July 25, 1978 (EST)
- Target: Supporters of Puerto Rican independence
- Attack type: Assassination, murder
- Weapons: Machine guns, rifles, pistols
- Deaths: 2
- Perpetrator: Puerto Rico Police

Cerro Maravilla, location of the murders

The Cerro Maravilla murders, also known as the Cerro Maravilla massacre, occurred on July 25, 1978, at Cerro Maravilla, a mountain in Ponce, Puerto Rico, wherein two young Puerto Rican pro-independence activists, Carlos Enrique Soto Arriví (Note: In this Spanish name, the first or paternal surname is Soto and the second or maternal family name is Arriví.) (born December 8, 1959) and Arnaldo Darío Rosado Torres (Note: In this Spanish name, the first or paternal surname is Rosado and the second or maternal family name is Torres.) (born November 23, 1953), were murdered in a Puerto Rico Police ambush after being entrapped. The event sparked a series of political controversies where, in the end, the police officers were found guilty of murder and several high-ranking local government officials were accused of planning and/or covering up the incident.

Originally declared a police intervention against terrorists, the local media quickly questioned the officers' testimonies as well as the only surviving witness for inconsistencies. Carlos Romero Barceló (PNP), then Governor of Puerto Rico, ordered the local Justice Department to launch various investigations, and asked the Federal Bureau of Investigation (FBI) and the US Justice Department to aid in the investigations, which concluded that there was no wrongdoing on the officers' part. However, after the main local opposing political party (PPD) launched its own inquiries, new evidence and witness testimonies surfaced which uncovered gross negligence and murder on the officers' part, as well as the possibility of a local and federal cover-up. Trials were held and a total of 10 officers were convicted of various crimes.

The incident and subsequent events have become one of the most controversial events in Puerto Rico's political history, frequently called "the worst political cover-up in the history of the island". The event is often used by Puerto Rican independence activists as an example of political repression against the independence movement. Joy James commented that "the Cerro Maravilla massacre clearly demonstrated why colonialism was declared a crime against humanity."

== Background ==
Puerto Rico (then named Borinquen) was discovered by Christopher Columbus on November 19, 1493; it was first colonized by Juan Ponce de León in 1508. Despite being welcomed by the indigenous Taíno people, the Spanish settlers began to exploit the Taíno as labor for gold mining and crop growing. After failed revolts, the Taíno accepted Spanish rule as less harsh than the British Empire. Spanish colonists began to have children with the Taíno, creating a mestizo culture, while the indigenous culture disappeared due to hard labor, European diseases, and tough Spanish rule.

Spain imposed tough trade policies upon its colonies, prohibiting the trade of most goods with other countries and colonies. In the 16th century, sugarcane was found to be a profitable crop; when the Taíno failed to harvest it effectively, slaves were imported from Africa. While other crops were introduced over the next two centuries, sugar remained the most profitable. Spanish trade policies caused smugglers to begin a black market, which traded with the British, Dutch, and nearby islands.

Entrenched in war, Spain failed to enforce its trade policies, which caused Spanish ships to be targeted by the Spanish and British. When Spain allowed neutral countries to use Spanish ports, the United States used its ships to transport goods from Spain to its colonies but desired greater influence over the colonies. In 1868, a small group of Puerto Ricans staged a rebellion against Spanish rule, the Grito de Lares 'Cry of Lares', which seized the mountain town of Lares, but was quickly shut down by Spanish authorities.

In the aftermath of the Ten Years' War for Cuban independence, slavery was outlawed in Puerto Rico in 1873; in an 1896 agreement brokered by autonomist Luis Muñoz Rivera, Puerto Rico was given an autonomous local government as well as representation in the Spanish government. After the sinking of the USS Maine on February 15, 1898, the U.S. launched the Spanish–American War on May 1; the U.S. Army landed on the town of Guánica during the Puerto Rico campaign on July 25. The U.S. seized control of the island after three days, with only 26 fatalities: 17 Spanish soldiers, five American soldiers, and four civilians. Spain signed the Treaty of Paris on December 10, where it agreed to an independent Cuba, selling the Philippines to the U.S. for US$20 million (US$659.74 million in 2025), and ceding Guam and Puerto Rico.

=== Victims ===
Arnaldo Rosado

Carlos Enrique Soto Arriví was born on December 8, 1959, in San Juan. His parents were Pedro Juan Soto (one of the most admired Puerto Rican novelists in the 20th century) and Rosa Arriví. He had an older brother (Roberto Alfonso) and a younger brother (Juan Manuel).

As a student he enjoyed literature. He also wrote stories and went on to win second place in a competition held by the Puerto Rico Department of Education. When his parents went to Europe to finish their doctoral studies, he learned to speak French in a year. Upon returning from Europe, he enrolled at the Escuela Superior República de Colombia, a high school in Río Piedras, although in a lower grade, because the school officials did not want to credit his years of overseas study. Although Soto Arriví was interested in social issues from a very young age, his political activism started when he joined a pro-independence group in high school.

Arnaldo Darío Rosado Torres was born on November 23, 1953, in Old San Juan. His parents were Pablo Rosado and Juana Torres Aymat. Rosado finished his high school studies and went to work at a cracker factory. Dario Rosado was married to Angela Rivera, and had a son called Manuel Lenín Rosado Rivera.

From a very young age, Rosado identified with the cause of Puerto Rico's independence. He joined the socialist league with which he participated in several activities. Rosado was an autodidact and an avid reader of various kinds of literature, especially those related to the political processes of Puerto Rico and Latin America. He also wrote poems, essays, and had several pen-pals throughout Latin America.

== Incident ==
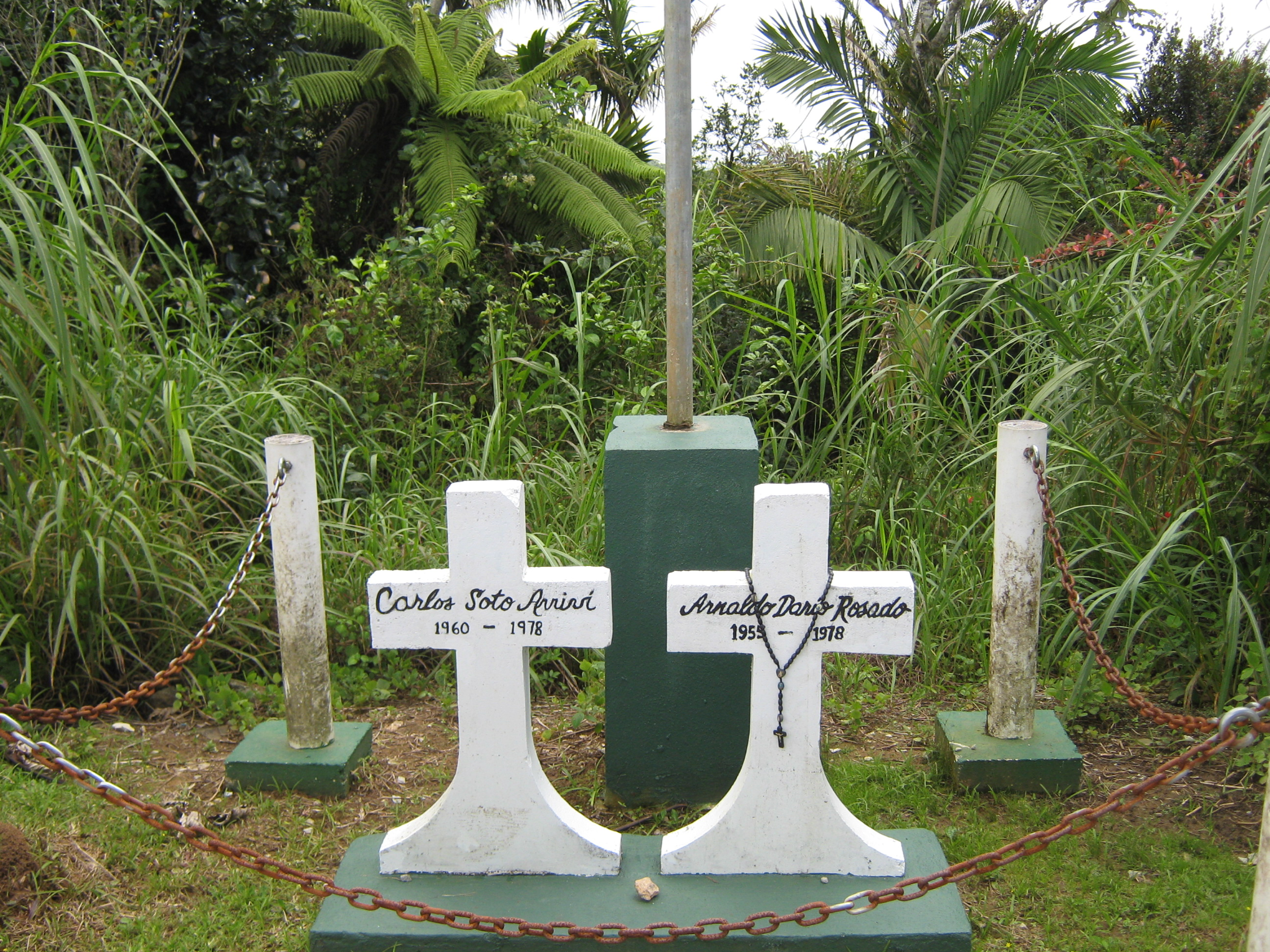
Cerro Maravilla Incident Memorial Stone, near top of Cerro Maravilla

Around noon July 25, 1978, Carlos Enrique Soto Arriví and Arnaldo Darío Rosado, two independence activists of the Armed Revolutionary Movement (Spanish: Movimiento Revolucionario Armado), along with undercover police officer Alejandro González Malavé posing as a fellow group member, took taxi driver Julio Ortiz Molina hostage in Villalba and ordered him to drive them to Cerro Maravilla where several communication towers were located. Their original plan was to take control of the towers and read a manifesto protesting the imprisonment of Puerto Rican nationalists convicted of the 1950 assassination attempt on U.S. President Harry S. Truman, the 1954 United States Capitol shooting incident where five members of Congress were injured, the commemoration of the July 25 Constitution Day observance, the day U.S. soldiers landed in Puerto Rico in 1898. State police officers were alerted of their plan prior to their arrival and the activists were ambushed and shot. The undercover agent received a minor bullet wound during the shooting, while the taxi driver was left relatively unharmed.

=== Initial statements ===
The morning after the shootings, the officers argued that they acted in self defense, stating that they ordered the activists to surrender, at which time the activists started shooting at them and they returned fire. Initially, the taxi driver said he was under the dashboard of his cab when the shooting started and could not see who shot first, although he contradicted his statement a few days later in an interview with the San Juan Star, a local newspaper, stating that he ducked under the dashboard of the car after the three men (the two activists and the undercover agent) left the car, and that he saw "10 heavily armed men" approaching. When he emerged from the car, he saw the three men alive and two of them were being beaten by the armed men, who were later identified as policemen. Then-Governor of Puerto Rico Carlos Romero Barceló (PNP) praised the officers in a televised address by calling them “heroic”, stating that they acted in self-defense and stopped a terrorist attack.

Two days later, in a follow-up interview by WAPA-TV news reporter Enrique Cruz, the taxi driver stated that when the first shooting occurred, he heard one of his three passengers shout "I'm an agent! Don't shoot me, I'm an agent!" while the others called for help and shouted "I give up! I give up!". He saw "10 heavily armed men" approaching, later identified as police agents, when the three passengers exited the car, and the taxi driver was ordered at gunpoint to exit the vehicle. He was extracted by an agent, kicked, and taken away from the scene. While being escorted, he saw the two activists directly in front of his vehicle being beaten by the armed men.

=== First investigations ===
Facing public pressure due to the taxi driver's conflicting statements, Governor Romero Barceló ordered two separate investigations by the P.R. Justice Department in addition to the ongoing standard Police investigation, all of which concluded that the officers' actions were free of any wrongdoing, despite various inconsistencies in their stories. P.R. District Attorney Pedro Colton informed reporters on July 29, four days after the incident, that the P.R. Justice Department's investigation revealed "no massacre, no beatings, and no aggressions, except for the shootings that occurred in Cerro Maravilla". Opposing political parties, mainly the Popular Democratic Party (PPD), insisted that the investigations were just cover-ups and demanded that a special independent prosecutor be assigned to investigate. Two special investigations by the U.S. Justice Department's Civil Rights Division and by the U.S. Federal Bureau of Investigation (FBI) were performed on separate occasions between 1978 and 1980, which confirmed the conclusions of the P.R. Justice Department that the officers acted in self-defense.

=== Second investigations ===
In the November 1980 general elections, Governor Romero Barceló was re-elected by a margin of 3,503 votes (one of the closest in Puerto Rico history), though his party lost control of the state legislature to the main opposition party, the PPD. This loss was attributed by The New York Times to the surrounding controversy regarding the investigations at the time. Other news organizations, such as Time, attributed the loss to Gov. Romero Barcelo's stance on the island's political status. The Legislature quickly started new inquiries and hearings into the Cerro Maravilla incident. The Senate, then presided by Miguel Hernández Agosto, spearheaded the investigations by naming former Assistant District Attorney Hector Rivera Cruz to investigate.

The second investigations performed between 1981 and 1984 by the legislature, the U.S. Justice Department headed by Daniel Lopéz Romo, and the local press uncovered a plot to assassinate the activists and a possible, though not conclusive, conspiracy to cover-up these actions. During interviews of the Senate Investigations Committee in 1983, officer Miguel Cartagena Flores, a detective in the Intelligence Division of the Puerto Rico Police Department, testified: “When I arrived at the scene I saw 4 police officers aiming their guns at the two activists who were kneeling before them. I turned my eyes away and heard 5 gunshots." Cartagena, who was offered immunity for his testimony, added that several hours before the shooting, he and other officers were told by Col. Angel Perez Casillas, commander of the Intelligence Division, that “these terrorists should not come down (from the mountain) alive.” His testimony was corroborated by officer Carmelo Cruz who, although he did not witness the fatal shooting, confirmed many details provided by Cartagena when also granted immunity.

Other inquiries obtained similar testimony from witnesses, including the taxi driver who now stated that the activists were “alive and disarmed” when the police removed him from the scene. The taxi driver stated that there was a short exchange of gunfire, and when he was removed to another place nearby he heard a second volley of gunfire, but was asked by the police and investigators of the PR Justice Department to forget about the second round of shots. The statement regarding two different volleys of shots was upheld by various people, including ex-officer Jesus Quiñones before a Federal grand jury (he quit the force shortly after the shootings), and three other civilian witnesses in a San Juan Star interview.

Subsequently, the legislature and local press started questioning the actions of the Puerto Rico Police, the Puerto Rico Justice Department, the U.S. Justice Department, and the FBI actions during the first investigation, alleging corruption within the agencies and a conspiracy to cover-up evidence. Letters were sent by various community and political leaders to then Senate Judiciary Committee chairman Senator Edward M. Kennedy, asking for an inquiry into the conduct of the Federal investigations. Several letters even accused former US Attorney General Benjamin R. Civiletti of providing aid to Gov. Romero Barceló during the investigations. Two leaders from the opposing parties, the Popular Democratic Party and the Puerto Rican Independence Party, charged that after a December 1979 meeting between the two, the Governor, then considered as a lifelong Republican, began campaigning to deliver the 41 Democratic Party convention votes of the island for President Jimmy Carter's (D) nomination for the presidency (ironically, Carter's opponent for the nomination was Senator Kennedy). Almost 45 days after President Carter won the nomination by only one delegate, the U.S. Justice Department announced that due to lack of evidence it was bringing its investigation of the case to an end. A Justice Department internal memorandum that was issued the same month of Romero Barceló's and Civiletti's meeting later proved that the investigations were closed even when agents were still investigating important evidence of the case that could potentially incriminate the officers, including “several unexplained contusions” on a victim's face and the fact that one of the police officers recanted his original story, stating that there was in fact “two bursts of firing”.

These and several other accusations brought public and political pressure to the investigating agencies. This led to internal revisions of evidence and procedures from the first investigations both at the local and federal level, though all organizations still adamantly denied any cover-up. These second investigations led to reassignments, demotions and resignations among top officials within the PR Justice Department, including three different P.R. Secretaries of Justice (equivalent to State Attorney General) accepting and resigning their posts in a span of six months. On November 29, 1983, three prosecutors were relieved of their duties after a report by the state Senate Investigations Committee found they had failed to properly investigate the Cerro Maravilla shootings, citing 101 specific deficiencies in two investigations. This was the third state Attorney General to oversee the investigations since the shootings occurred in 1978.

== Aftermath ==
The second investigations led to ten officers being indicted for perjury, destruction of evidence, and obstruction of justice. In 1985, all 10 officers were also found guilty of 45 counts of perjury in federal court and received prison terms ranging from six to 30 years. During their trial, the officer insisted that they had been fighting for democracy against communism. The convicted officers, who were no longer on active duty, were:

1. Col. Ángel Pérez Casillas (head of the Puerto Rico Police Department Intelligence Division during the incident; suspended): 20 years
2. Lieut. Nelson González Pérez (resigned): 24 years
3. Lieut. Jaime Quíles Hernández (suspended): 12 years
4. Officer Juan Bruno González (suspended): 16 years
5. Officer William Colón Berríos (suspended): 12 years; overturned on appeal
6. Officer Nazario Mateo Espada (suspended): 6 years
7. Officer Rafael Moreno Morales (suspended): 30 years
8. Officer Luis Reverón Martínez (on disability leave): 25 years
9. Officer Jose Ríos Polanco (suspended): 10 years
10. Officer Rafael Torres Marrero (on disability leave): 20 years

Eight of the officers were then tried for first degree murder in state court. In 1987, Jaime Quíles Hernández, Nelson González Pérez, Rafael Torres Marrero, Nazario Mateo Espada, and Juan Bruno Gonzalez all pleaded guilty to lesser charges of second degree murder and perjury. Quíles Hernández, González Pérez, Torres Marrero, and Mateo Espada were each sentenced to 30 years in prison. The sentence of Mateo Espada was ordered to run concurrently to his federal sentence, while the sentences of the other three were ordered to run consecutively. Juan Bruno González was sentenced to a maximum of 13 years in prison, but consecutively to his federal sentence. The sixth officer, William Colón Berríos, whose federal convictions were overturned on appeal, pleaded guilty to conspiracy to commit murder and two counts of perjury. The last two officers, Angel Luis Pérez Casillas and Rafael Moreno Morales, went to trial. Pérez Casillas was acquitted, while Moreno Morales was found guilty of second degree murder in the death of Carlos Soto Arriví and sentenced to 22 to 30 years in prison.

Jose Ríos Polanco was paroled on March 20, 1989. Ángel Pérez Casillas was paroled on November 26, 1991. Luis Reverón Martínez was paroled on July 28, 1993.

Quíles Hernandez and Torres Marrero were both paroled in 1993, Bruno González was paroled in 1995, and González Pérez was paroled in 1997. When Moreno Morales came up for parole in 2000, officials noticed that the there had been a mistake, and that the sentences of the officers were supposed to run consecutively with their federal sentences. In March 2001, a judge in Puerto had all four men sent back to prison, ruling that they had been mistakenly paroled early and would have to serve at least another six to eight years in prison. González Pérez and Torres Marrero were both paroled again on August 26, 2008. Moreno Morales was paroled for his federal conviction on January 31, 2003. His minimum term was set to expire on June 14, 2015, and his maximum term was set to expire on December 16, 2019. However, in February 2015, it was discovered that Moreno Morales had already been paroled early on July 19, 2013, without the Parole Board notifying the relatives of those killed. He was the last person still serving time for the murders.

That same year, in the general elections held in November, Romero Barceló lost his gubernatorial seat against former governor and opposing party rival Rafael Hernández Colón (PPD). It is widely accepted that Romero Barceló lost the elections because of this case, since his public opinion rating had deteriorated substantially during late 1984 as the investigations progressed, and since his political rivals used his defense of the officers as an indication of a possible conspiracy.

=== Undercover agent murdered ===
Alejandro Gonzalez Malavé, the undercover agent who was accompanying the activists, was not indicted for his part in the slayings because he was granted immunity for testifying against other officers, but was removed from the police force due to public pressure. In February 1986, he was acquitted of kidnapping the taxi driver. His lawyer had argued that he was acting under orders and, therefore, it was the government who was actually guilty of kidnapping. This, despite the testimony presented by officer Carmelo Cruz who had testified that it was Gonzalez who recklessly endangered the hostage's life. The prosecution had provided evidence that he threatened the hostage at gunpoint, drove the car, and, when the car approached the mountaintop, refused to free the hostage despite suggestions from the activists. These actions, according to officer Cruz, were contrary to standard police procedures since his primary concern should have been the safety of the hostage. Nevertheless, the Puerto Rico Police Department did not reinstate Gonzalez as an active police officer, a fact that he publicly expressed resentment over, and subsequently threatened to provide incriminating evidence to the media about other individuals involved in the shootings unless reinstated.

On the evening of April 29, 1986, just two months after his acquittal, Gonzalez was assassinated in front of his mother's house in Bayamón. He sustained three gunshot wounds and his mother was slightly injured. A few hours later, a group identifying itself as the “Volunteer Organization for the Revolution” called local news agencies claiming responsibility. In their statements they swore to kill, "one by one," all the policemen involved in the deaths in Cerro Maravilla. The FBI considered it one of the most dangerous terrorist organizations in the United States at the time, given that it was the same organization that claimed responsibility for an attack on a Navy bus in Puerto Rico on December 3, 1979, in which two Navy men were killed and 10 people injured, and the attack on a U.S. National Guard base on January 12, 1981, in which six fighter-jet planes were destroyed. To this day, no one has been identified as a possible suspect in Gonzalez's murder, and the case remains unsolved.

=== Public apologies ===
In 1992, former US Justice Department Civil Rights Division chief Drew S. Days III admitted before the P.R. Senate that the U.S. Justice Department and the FBI acted negligently during the 1978–1980 investigations of the Cerro Maravilla incident, such as rejecting interviews with key witnesses (including the taxi driver), refusing to offer immunity to certain witnesses, and avoiding various standard investigating tasks. Days stated: "I think that certainly an apology is justified with respect to the way the federal government handled its investigation: the FBI, the Justice Department, and my division... it was not done in the professional way that it should have been done." FBI Director William S. Sessions had made similar concessions in a written statement in 1990, stating: “In hindsight, the eyewitness should have been interviewed and a civil rights investigation initiated”.

In 2003, 25 years after the incident, former Gov. Romero Barceló admitted in a public radio interview that it was “an error of judgment” and “a premature declaration” to laud the police officers, since at that time he believed they were telling the truth about their self-defense. However, he has publicly denied any wrongdoing regarding the alleged cover-up during the first investigations.

== Legacy ==
- Since the conclusion of the final investigations, there has been heated debate about the Cerro Maravilla incident in Puerto Rico, with some groups arguing that there are still others responsible for planning and/or ordering the plot to kill the activists as well as the subsequent cover-up, while others have argued that the incident was exaggerated by rival politicians and the media, maintaining that no conspiracy ever took place and that some of the officers incarcerated, though not all, are actually innocent.
- Every year on July 25, Puerto Rican Nationalists, independence activists and other sympathizers, gather atop Cerro Maravilla to honor Carlos Enrique Soto Arriví and Arnaldo Darío Rosado, as well as to defend and celebrate the Puerto Rican independence ideology. The mountain has also been christened as “El Cerro de los Mártires” (The Mountain of the Martyrs).
- In 2007 the Instituto de Cultura Puertorriqueña published a book by Manuel Suarez, Samuel Dash and William Kennedy titled "Dos linchamientos en el Cerro Maravilla : los asesinatos policíacos en Puerto Rico y el encubrimiento del Gobierno Federal" (Two lynchings on Cerro Maravilla: the police killings in Puerto Rico and the cover-up by the Federal Government).

== In popular culture ==
- The film A Show of Force (1990) is loosely based on the events and theories behind the incident.
- "Odio" (transl. hate) is a song and video by Grammy Award-winner iLe which sings about and recreates the events of that day-which she hopes will help promote and foster understanding.

== See also ==
- Puerto Rico Highway 577
- The 1950 Peñuelas Incident
