= Daniel López Romo =

Puerto Rican lawyer (1945–2024)

United States Attorney for the District of Puerto Rico
- In office 1982–1993
- President: Ronald Reagan; George H. W. Bush

Personal details
- Born: January 28, 1945 San Juan, Puerto Rico
- Died: September 20, 2024 (aged 79)
- Spouse: María González Mata
- Education: University of Puerto Rico at Mayaguez (BBA); Interamerican University of Puerto Rico School of Law (JD)

Military service
- Allegiance: United States of America
- Branch/service: United States Air Force; Puerto Rico Air National Guard
- Years of service: 1966–1978 USAF; 1978–2001 PR ANG
- Rank: Brigadier general

Daniel Francisco López Romo (January 28, 1945 – September 20, 2024) was a Puerto Rican United States attorney for the District of Puerto Rico, brigadier general and assistant adjutant general for Air, Puerto Rico Air National Guard. In 1990, he became the first Hispanic officer ever appointed to the United States Air Force Judge Advocate General's Air National Guard Advisory Council.

== Early life and education ==
López Romo was born in San Juan, Puerto Rico. He graduated from Colegio Ponceño in 1962. He obtained his bachelor’s degree from the University of Puerto Rico at Mayagüez, in 1966, having joined the Beta Activo chapter of Phi Sigma Alpha fraternity in 1963. He obtained a Juris Doctor from the Interamerican University of Puerto Rico School of Law in 1969. He also graduated from the Air Command and Staff College by correspondence in 1982.

== U.S. district attorney ==
López Romo was appointed as a United States attorney for the District of Puerto Rico in 1982 by president Ronald Reagan, and was reappointed numerous times. He eventually became head of the office.

As U.S. attorney, he investigated and prosecuted cases related to the Cerro Maravilla murders, including charges against tem police officers who had previously been hailed as heroes. He was also instrumental in virtually disbanding the Macheteros insurgent organization by arresting 15 of its members on August 31, 1985, after the group's $7 million Wells Fargo truck heist.

== Military career ==
After two years in the Army ROTC, López Romo joined the Air Force ROTC. He received his commission as a second lieutenant in the United States Air Force on September 7, 1966. He served from 1970 until 1974 as assistant judge advocate, 3902nd Airlift Bomb Wing at Offutt Air Force Base. From 1974 to 1978 he was at HQ ARPC (AFRES), in Denver, Colorado. He began his career with the Puerto Rico Air National Guard in 1978 as judge advocate staff officer, 156th Combat Support Squadron at Muñiz Air National Guard Base, until 1985. He was staff judge advocate, Headquarters, Puerto Rico ANG, San Juan, from 1985 to 1993. From 1993 to April 2001 he held the position of assistant adjutant general for Air, Puerto Rico Air National Guard.

López Romo retired after a total of 35 years of combined of military service: five years on active duty with the Air Force and 30 years in the Puerto Rico Air National Guard.

== Death ==
López Romo died on September 20, 2024, at his home, due to heart complications. He was 79 years old. He was buried at the Puerto Rico National Cemetery in Bayamón, Puerto Rico.

== Major awards and decorations ==
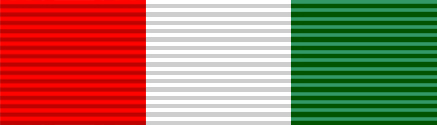
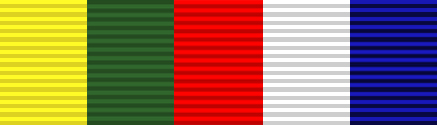
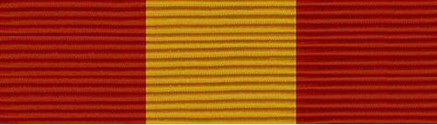
Air Force Outstanding Unit Award
National Defense Service Medal with one with bronze Service star
Air Force Longevity Service Award with three bronze Oak leaf clusters
Armed Forces Reserve Medal with Gold hourglass device
Small Arms Expert Marksmanship Ribbon with one bronze service star
Air Force Training Ribbon with one bronze service star
Puerto Rico National Guard Service Medal
Puerto Rico VIII Pan-American Games Support Ribbon
Puerto Rico National Guard Distinguished Service Medal

- Recipient of Meritorious Service Award, President's Committee Employment of Handicapped, 1982
- Federal Executive of the Year award, 1985
- Shining Star Civic Action Ribbon
- Posthumously inducted into the Puerto Rico Veterans Hall of Fame in 2025

== Effective dates of promotions ==
Insignia	Rank	Date
	Brigadier general	October 25, 1993
	Colonel	December 23, 1988
	Lieutenant colonel	August 7, 1985
	Major	February 13, 1979
	Captain	September 7, 1971
	First lieutenant	September 7, 1969
	Second lieutenant	September 7, 1966

== See also ==
- List of Puerto Ricans
- List of Puerto Rican military personnel
- Hispanics in the United States Air Force
