= Ala de la Piedra =

Barrio of Orocovis, Puerto Rico

- Barrio
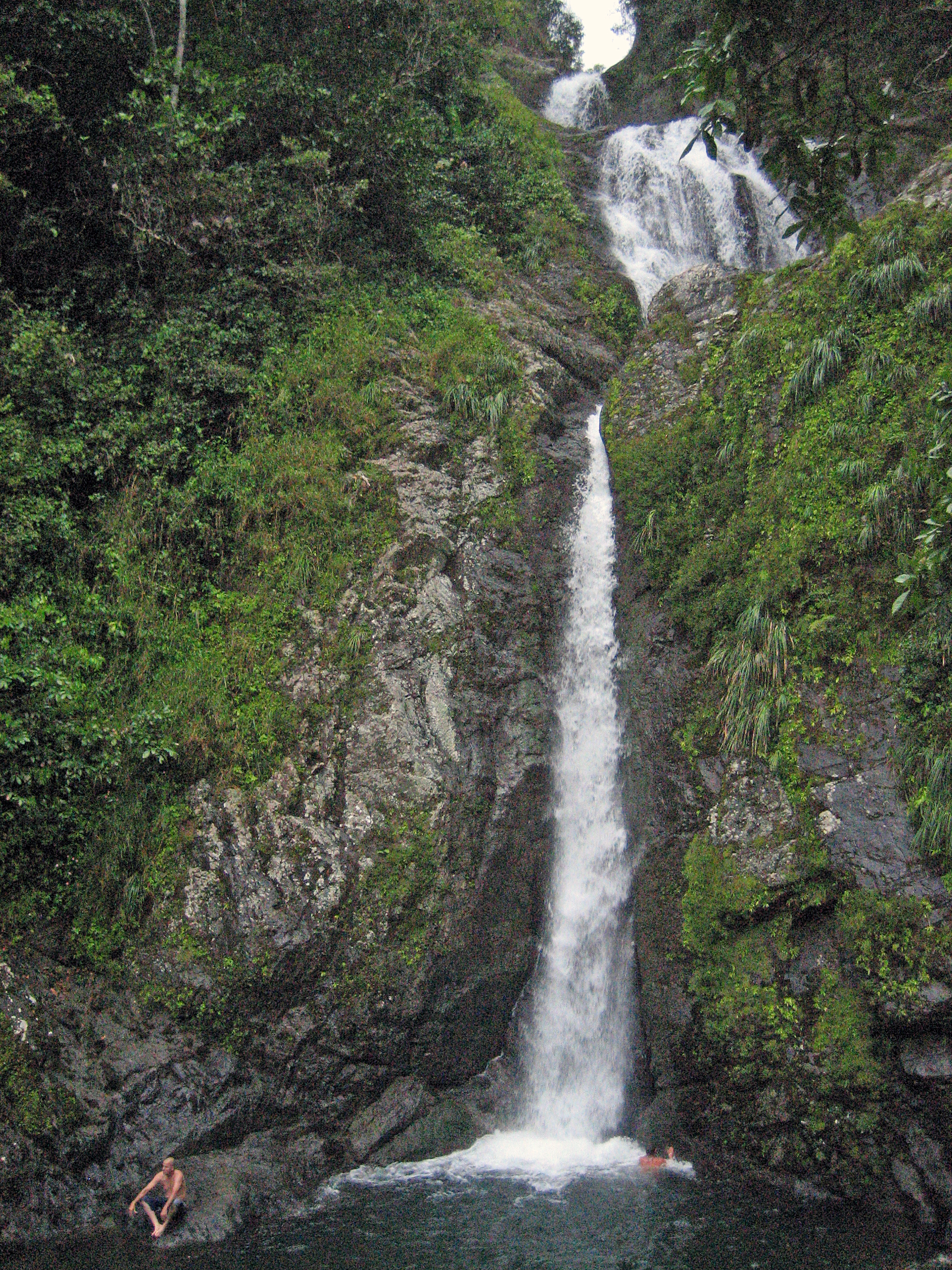
- Salto de Doña Juana in Ala de la Piedra

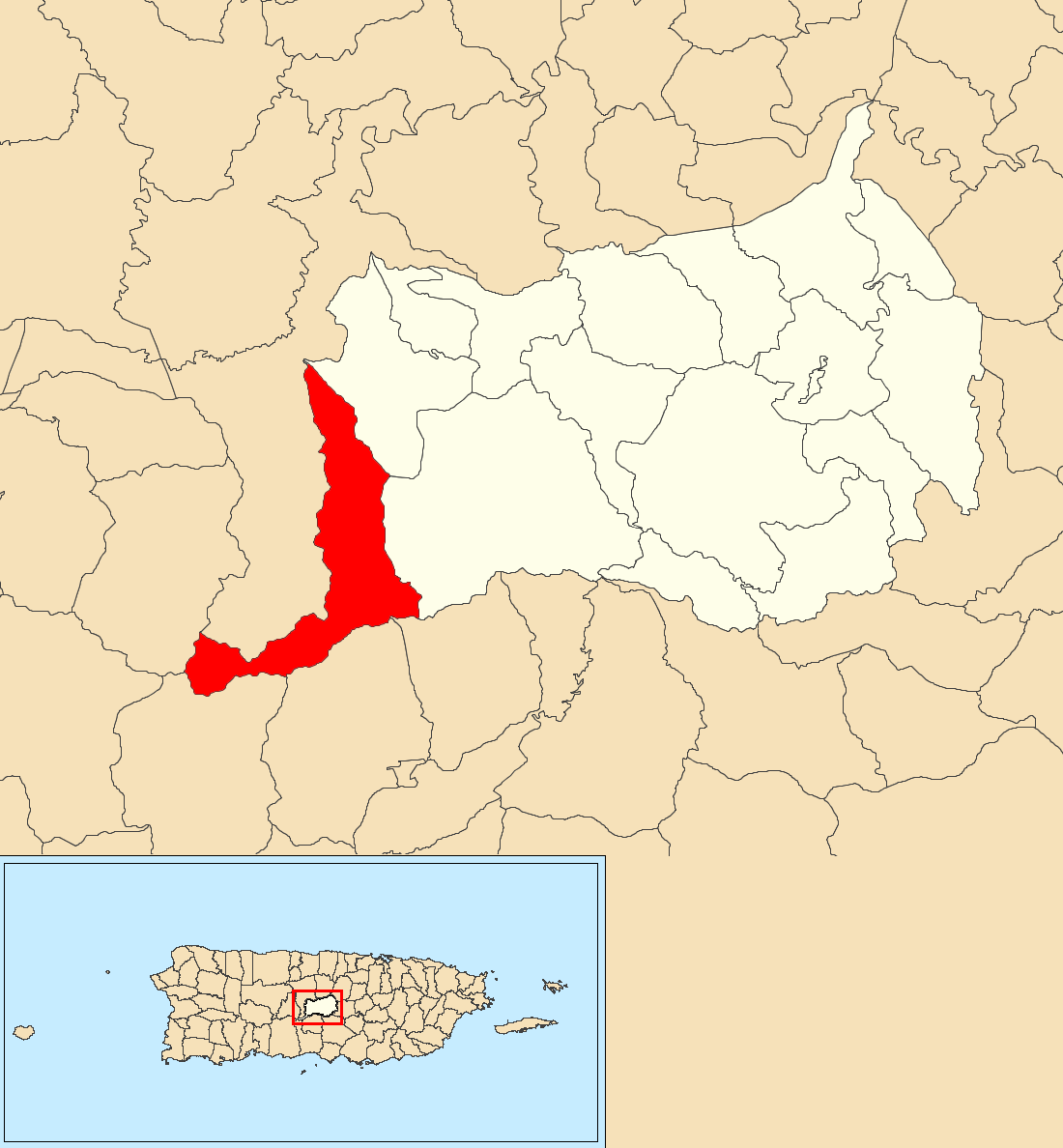
- Location of Ala de la Piedra within the municipality of Orocovis shown in red

- Location of Puerto Rico
- Coordinates: 18°10′47″N 66°30′38″W
- Commonwealth: Puerto Rico
- Municipality: Orocovis

Area
  - Total: 5.56 sq mi (14.4 km^{2})
  - Land: 5.51 sq mi (14.3 km^{2})
  - Water: 0.05 sq mi (0.13 km^{2})
- Elevation: 2,123 ft (647 m)

Population (2010)
  - Total: 419
  - Density: 76/sq mi (29/km^{2})
- Source: 2010 Census
- Time zone: UTC−4 (AST)
- ZIP Code: 00720
- Area code: 787/939

Ala de la Piedra is a barrio in the municipality of Orocovis, Puerto Rico. Its population in 2010 was 419.

== Sectors ==
Barrios (which are, in contemporary times, roughly comparable to minor civil divisions) in turn are further subdivided into smaller local populated place areas/units called sectores (sectors in English). The types of sectores may vary, from normally sector to urbanización to reparto to barriada to residencial, among others.

The following sectors are in Ala de la Prieta barrio:

Sector Divisoria, Sector Doña Juana, Sector El Frío, Sector El Guineo, and Sector La Torre.

== History ==
Ala de la Piedra was in Spain's gazetteers until Puerto Rico was ceded by Spain in the aftermath of the Spanish–American War under the terms of the Treaty of Paris of 1898 and became an unincorporated territory of the United States. In 1899, the United States Department of War conducted a census of Puerto Rico finding that the combined population of Ala de la Piedra and Orocovis barrios was 1,403.

Historical population
Census	Pop.	Note	%±
1910	629		—
1920	884		40.5%
1930	1,414		60.0%
1940	1,054		−25.5%
1950	784		−25.6%
1960	587		−25.1%
1970	554		−5.6%
1980	390		−29.6%
1990	449		15.1%
2000	418		−6.9%
2010	419		0.2%
U.S. Decennial Census; 1900 (N/A) 1910-1930; 1930-1950 1980-2000 2010

There is a camping site managed by a community center at Ala de la Piedra.

== See also ==
- List of communities in Puerto Rico
