= Bermejales =

Barrio of Orocovis, Puerto Rico

- Barrio
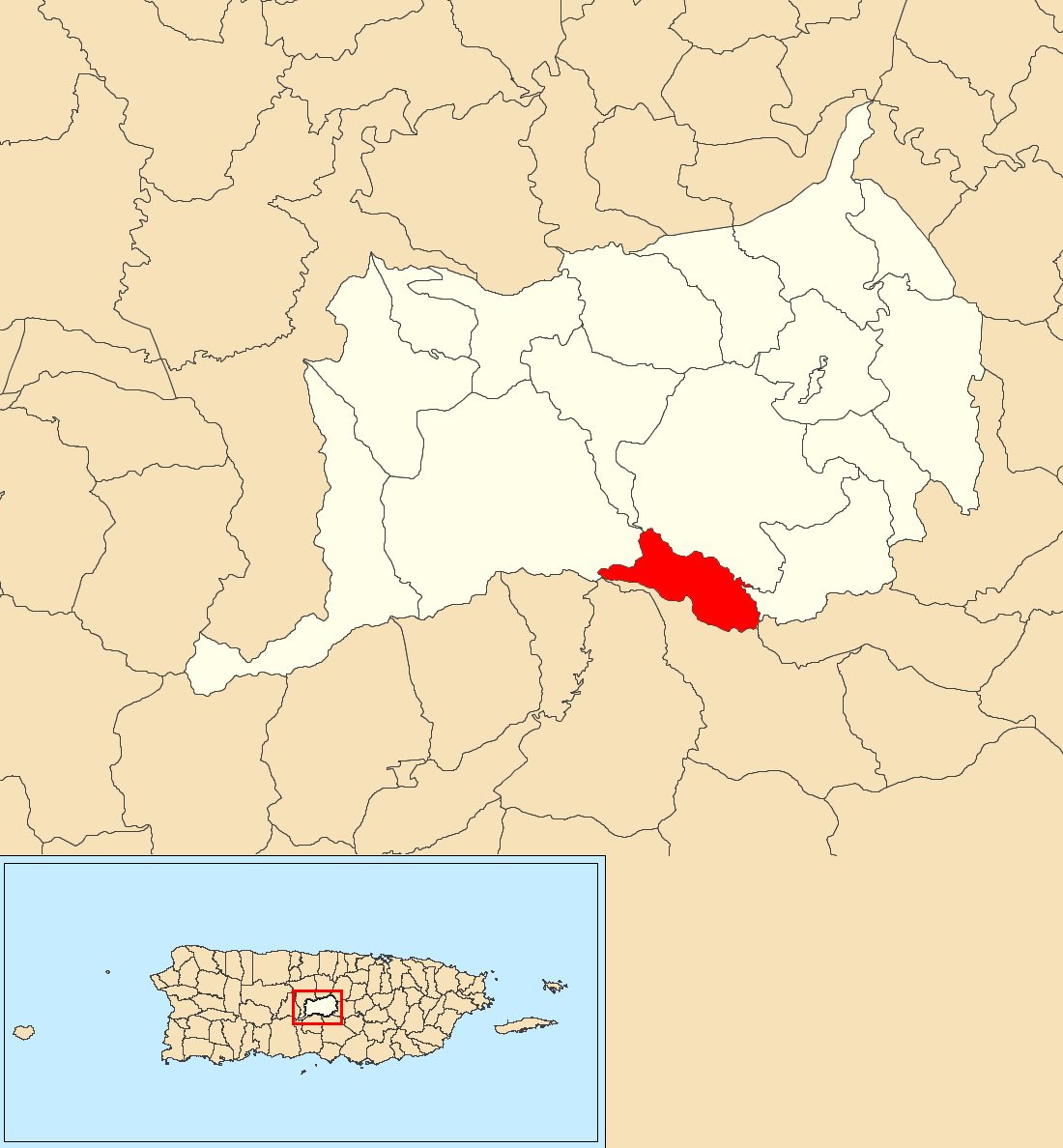
- Location of Bermejales within the municipality of Orocovis shown in red

- Location of Puerto Rico
- Coordinates: 18°10′30″N 66°25′21″W
- Commonwealth: Puerto Rico
- Municipality: Orocovis

Area
  - Total: 1.87 sq mi (4.8 km^{2})
  - Land: 1.87 sq mi (4.8 km^{2})
  - Water: 0 sq mi (0 km^{2})
- Elevation: 2,595 ft (791 m)

Population (2010)
  - Total: 500
  - Density: 267.4/sq mi (103.2/km^{2})
- Source: 2010 Census
- Time zone: UTC−4 (AST)
- ZIP Code: 00720
- Area code: 787/939

Bermejales is a barrio in the municipality of Orocovis, Puerto Rico. Its population in 2010 was 500.

== Sectors ==
Barrios (which are, in contemporary times, roughly comparable to minor civil divisions) in turn are further subdivided into smaller local populated place areas/units called sectores (sectors in English). The types of sectores may vary, from normally sector to urbanización to reparto to barriada to residencial, among others.

The following sectors are in Bermejales barrio:

Sector Buena Vista, Sector El Aguacate, Sector El Collao, Sector El Cometa, Sector El Mirador, Sector La Cuchilla, and Sector Tino Torres.

== History ==
Bermejales was in Spain's gazetteers until Puerto Rico was ceded by Spain in the aftermath of the Spanish–American War under the terms of the Treaty of Paris of 1898 and became an unincorporated territory of the United States. In 1899, the United States Department of War conducted a census of Puerto Rico finding that the population of Bermejales barrio was 1,317.

Historical population
Census	Pop.	Note	%±
1900	1,317		—
1910	1,214		−7.8%
1920	1,054		−13.2%
1930	913		−13.4%
1940	1,049		14.9%
1950	910		−13.3%
1960	656		−27.9%
1970	596		−9.1%
1980	669		12.2%
1990	646		−3.4%
2000	570		−11.8%
2010	500		−12.3%
U.S. Decennial Census; 1899 (shown as 1900) 1910-1930; 1930-1950 1980-2000 2010

== See also ==
- List of communities in Puerto Rico
