= Pedro García, Coamo, Puerto Rico =

Barrio of Puerto Rico

Pedro García
- Barrio
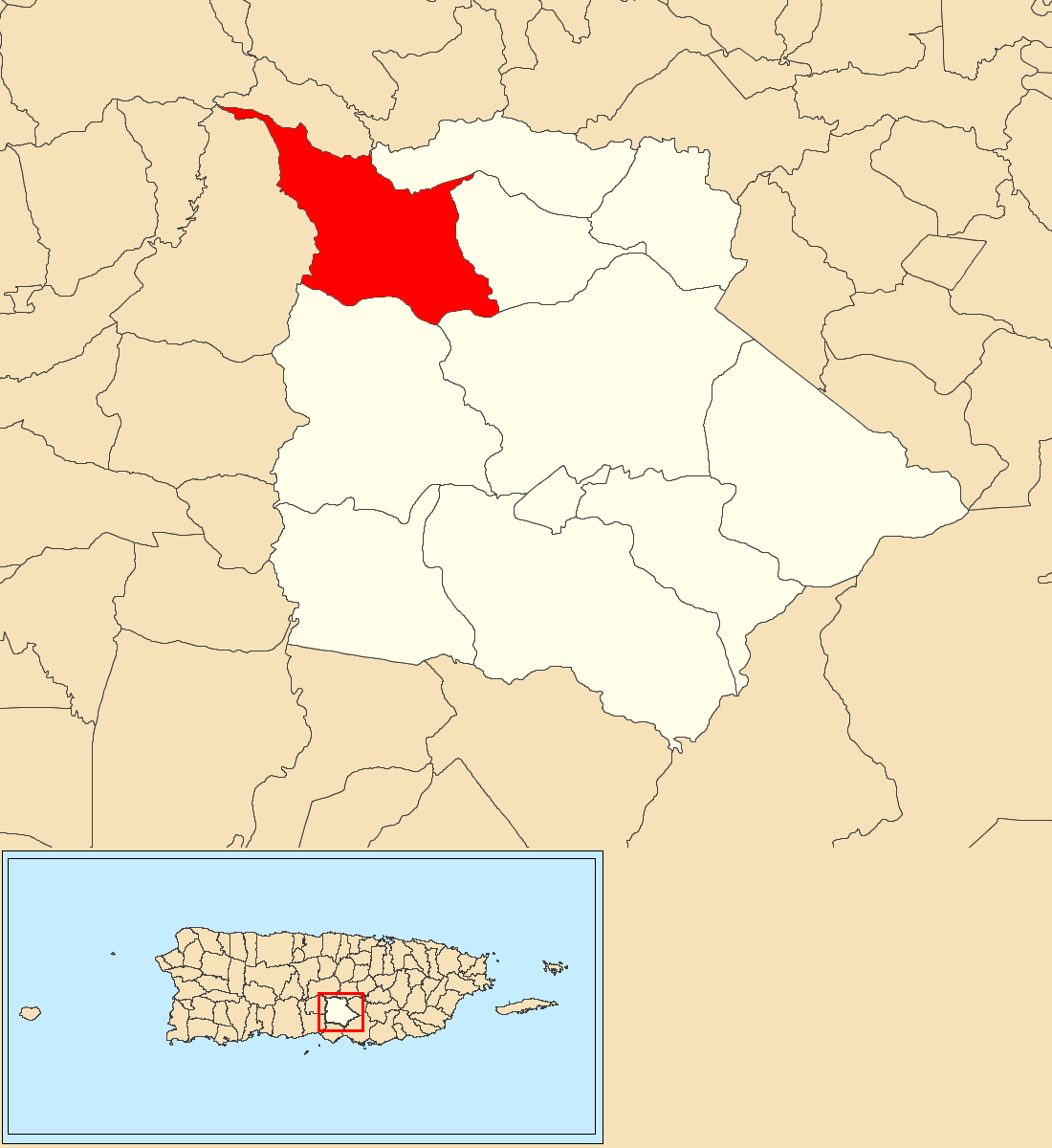
- Location of Pedro García within the municipality of Coamo shown in red

- Location of Puerto Rico
- Coordinates: 18°08′43″N 66°24′17″W
- Commonwealth: Puerto Rico
- Municipality: Coamo

Area
  - Total: 6.59 sq mi (17.1 km^{2})
  - Land: 6.59 sq mi (17.1 km^{2})
  - Water: 0 sq mi (0 km^{2})
- Elevation: 2,005 ft (611 m)

Population (2020)
  - Total: 471
- Source: 2020 Census
- Time zone: UTC−4 (AST)
- ZIP Code: 00769
- Area code: 787/939

Pedro García is a barrio in the municipality of Coamo, Puerto Rico. Its population in 2020 was 471.

== History ==
Pedro García was in Spain's gazetteers until Puerto Rico was ceded by Spain in the aftermath of the Spanish–American War under the terms of the Treaty of Paris of 1898 and became an unincorporated territory of the United States. In 1899, the United States Department of War conducted a census of Puerto Rico finding that the population of Pedro García barrio was 1,697.

Historical population
Census	Pop.	Note	%±
1900	1,697		—
1910	1,760		3.7%
1920	1,628		−7.5%
1930	1,150		−29.4%
1940	1,337		16.3%
1950	1,408		5.3%
1960	1,058		−24.9%
1970	813		−23.2%
1980	677		−16.7%
1990	592		−12.6%
2000	624		5.4%
2010	666		6.7%
2020	471		−29.3%
U.S. Decennial Census; 1899 (shown as 1900) 1910–1930; 1930–1950 1980–2000 2010 2020

== See also ==
- List of communities in Puerto Rico
