= Helechal, Barranquitas, Puerto Rico =

Barrio of Puerto Rico

Helechal
- Barrio
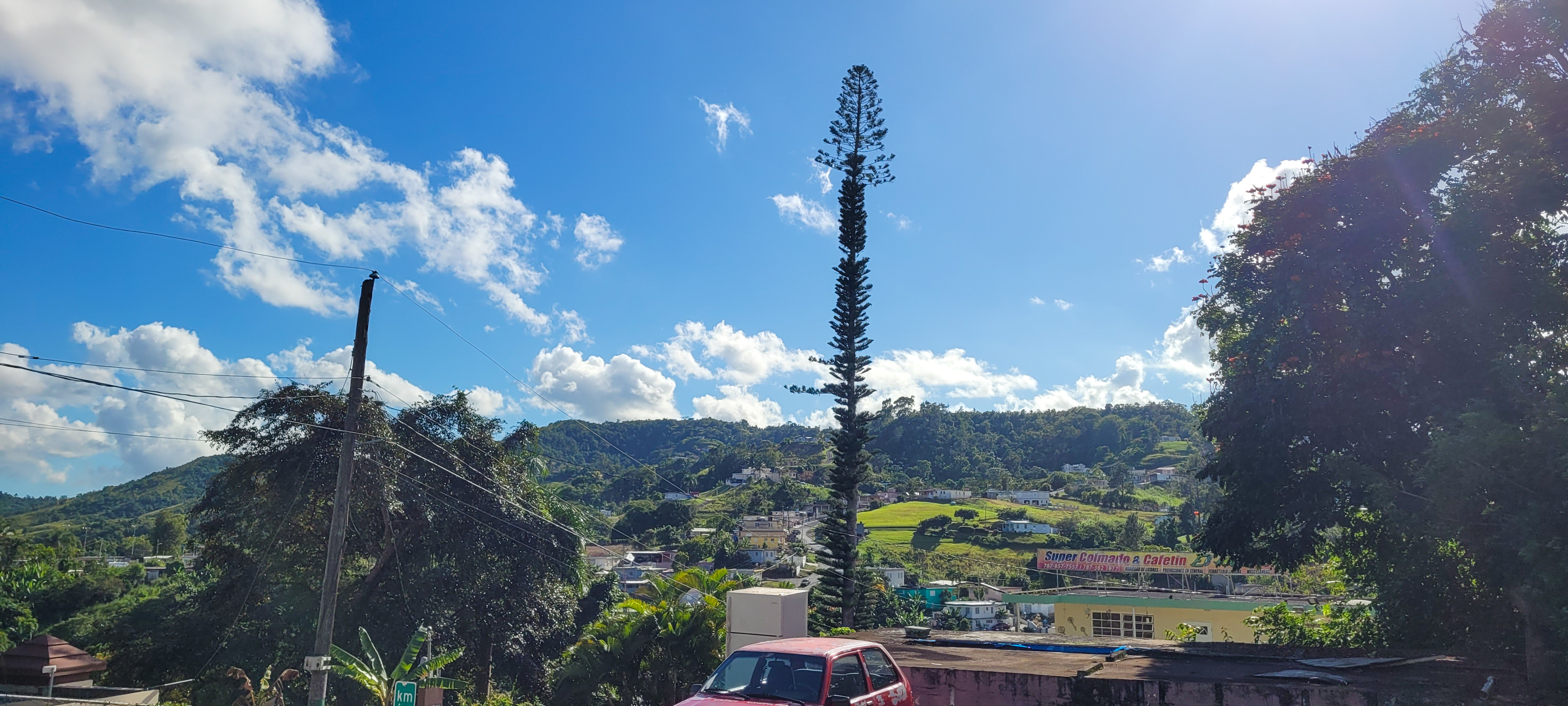
- Parcelas Helechal in Helechal barrio

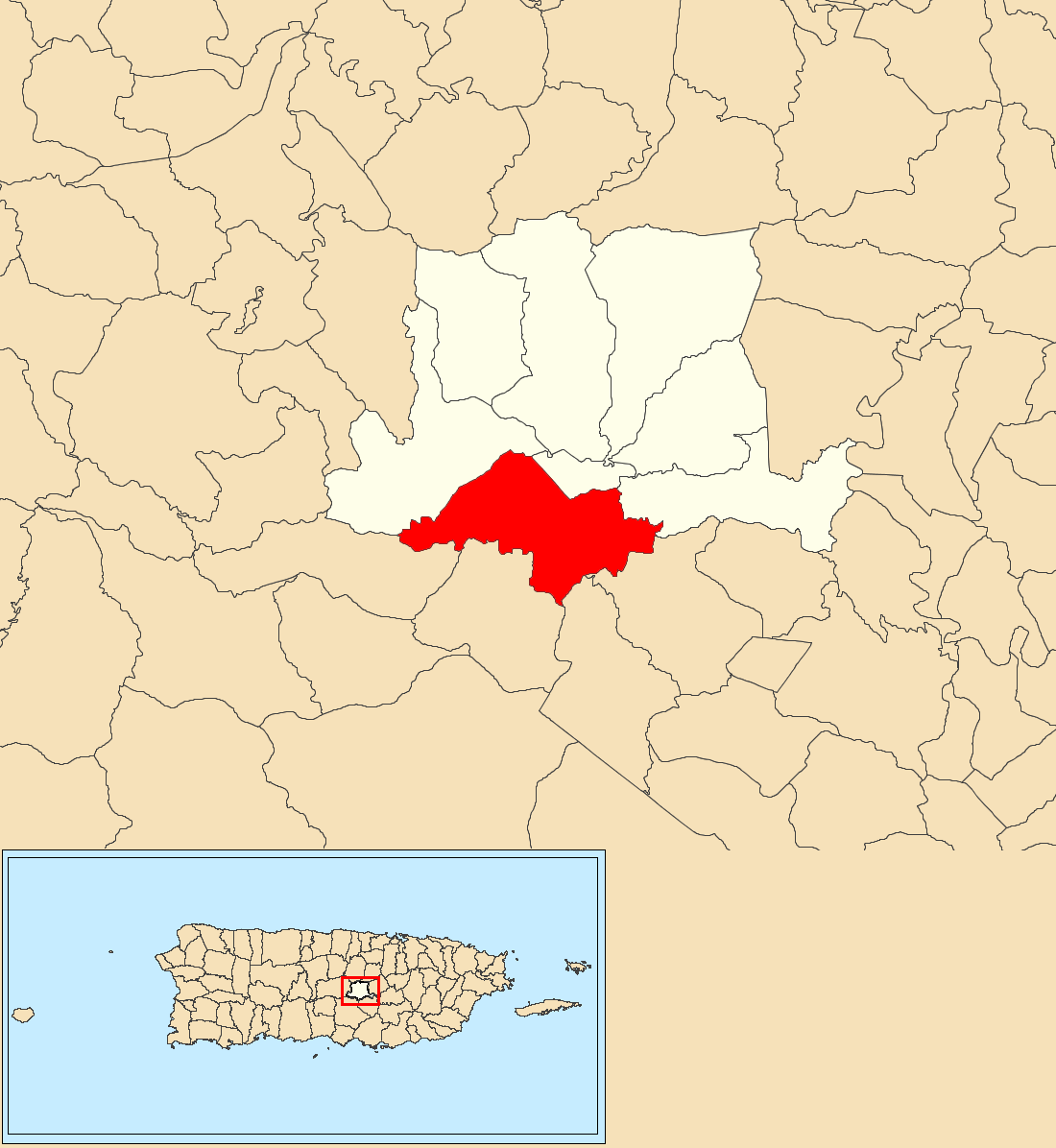
- Location of Helechal within the municipality of Barranquitas shown in red

- Location of Puerto Rico
- Coordinates: 18°10′12″N 66°19′18″W
- Commonwealth: Puerto Rico
- Municipality: Barranquitas

Area
  - Total: 4.87 sq mi (12.6 km^{2})
  - Land: 4.87 sq mi (12.6 km^{2})
  - Water: 0.00 sq mi (0 km^{2})
- Elevation: 2,185 ft (666 m)

Population (2010)
  - Total: 4,073
  - Density: 312.9/sq mi (120.8/km^{2})
- Source: 2010 Census
- Time zone: UTC−4 (AST)
- ZIP Code: 00794
- Area code: 787/939

Helechal is a barrio in the municipality of Barranquitas, Puerto Rico. Its population in 2010 was 4,073.

== History ==
Helechal was in Spain's gazetteers until Puerto Rico was ceded by Spain in the aftermath of the Spanish–American War under the terms of the Treaty of Paris of 1898 and became an unincorporated territory of the United States. In 1899, the United States Department of War conducted a census of Puerto Rico finding that the population of Helechal barrio was 1,485.

Historical population
Census	Pop.	Note	%±
1900	1,485		—
1910	1,177		−20.7%
1920	1,589		35.0%
1930	2,523		58.8%
1940	2,655		5.2%
1950	2,212		−16.7%
1960	2,533		14.5%
1970	2,803		10.7%
1980	3,013		7.5%
1990	3,637		20.7%
2000	3,959		8.9%
2010	4,073		2.9%
U.S. Decennial Census; 1899 (shown as 1900) 1910-1930; 1930-1950 1980-2000 2010

== Features and sites ==
Helechal is not easy to get to from San Juan, the capital of Puerto Rico, as it is deep in the Cordillera Central, the main mountain range in Puerto Rico, and accessed via twisting, turning roads. In Helechal there are two airplanes which have been converted into a restaurant called Los Aviones, which is visited by tourists and locals alike. The place is accessed by going over a rope bridge.

== Gallery ==
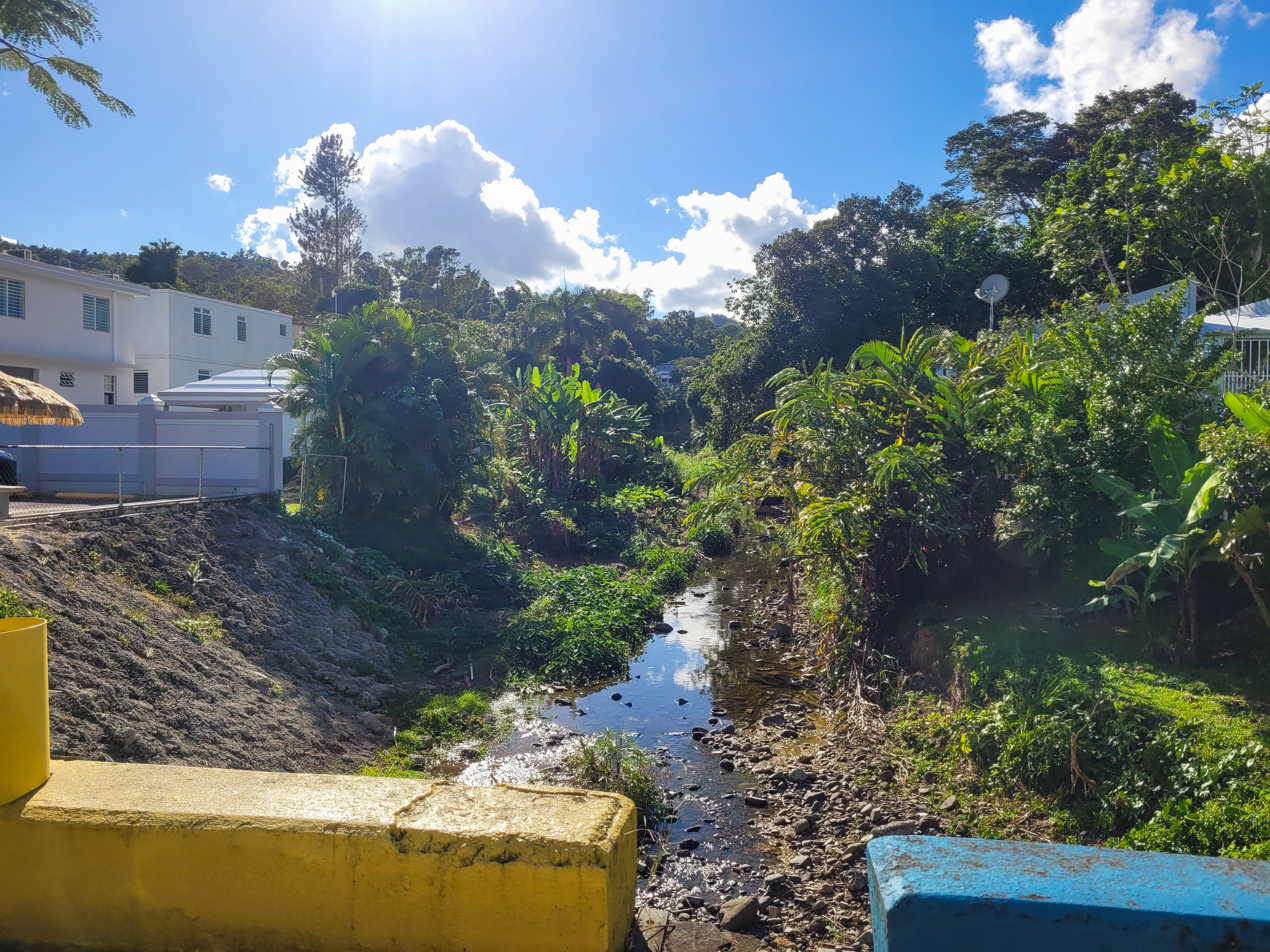
Quebrada Helechal in Parcelas Helechal

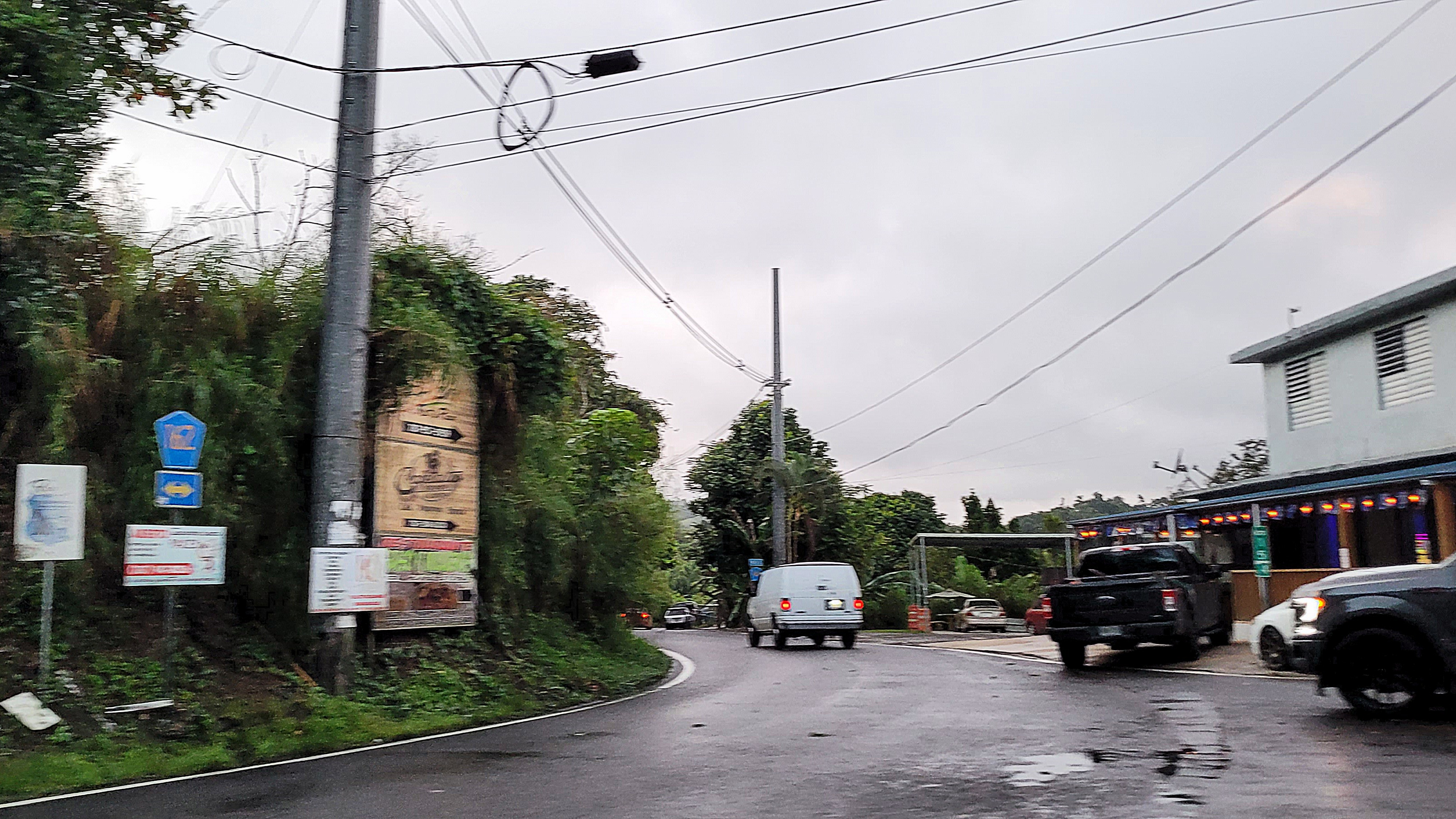
Puerto Rico Highway 162 in Helechal

== See also ==
- List of communities in Puerto Rico
