= Pulguillas, Coamo, Puerto Rico =

Barrio of Puerto Rico

Pulguillas
- Barrio
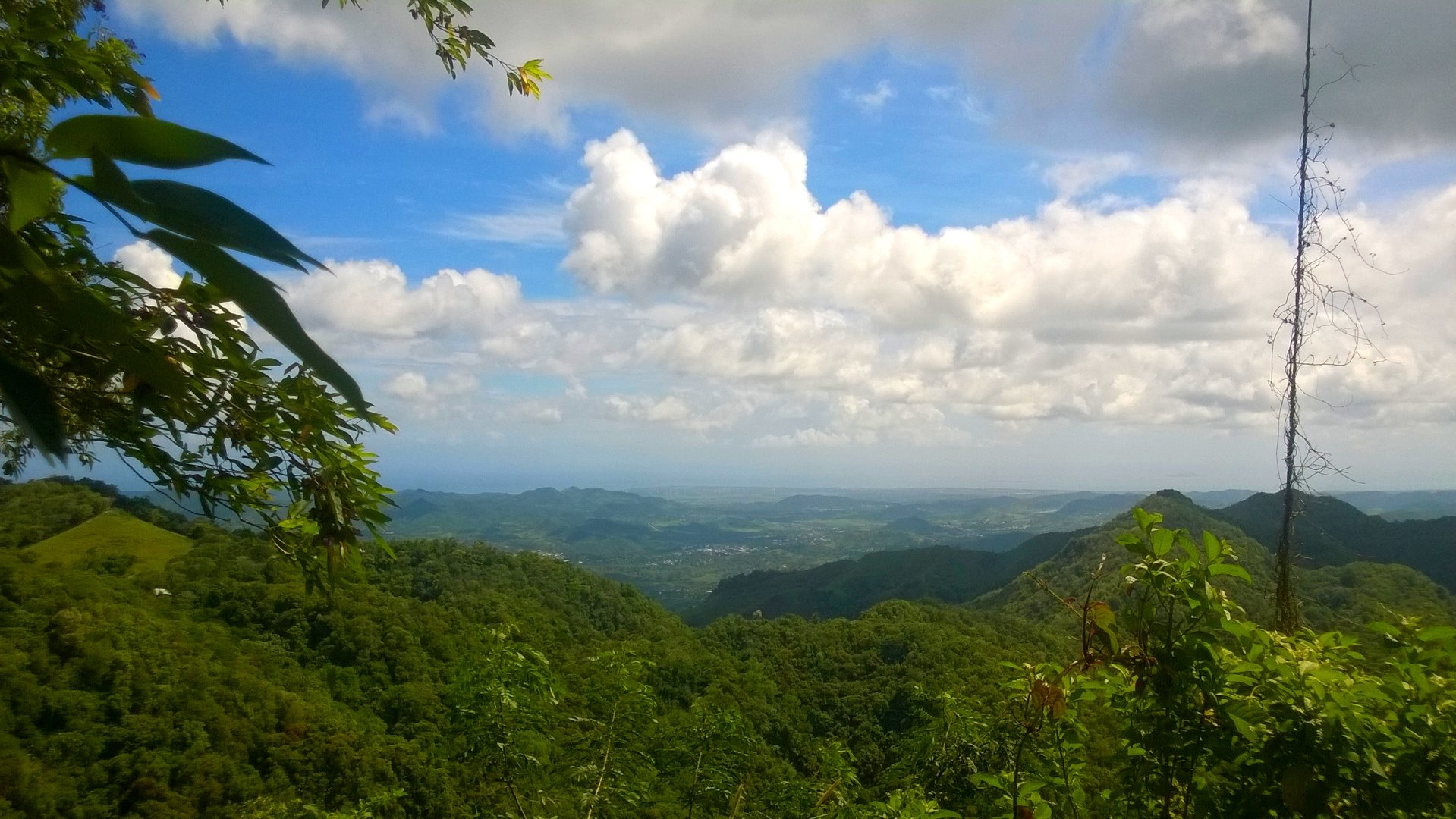
- View from Pulguillas

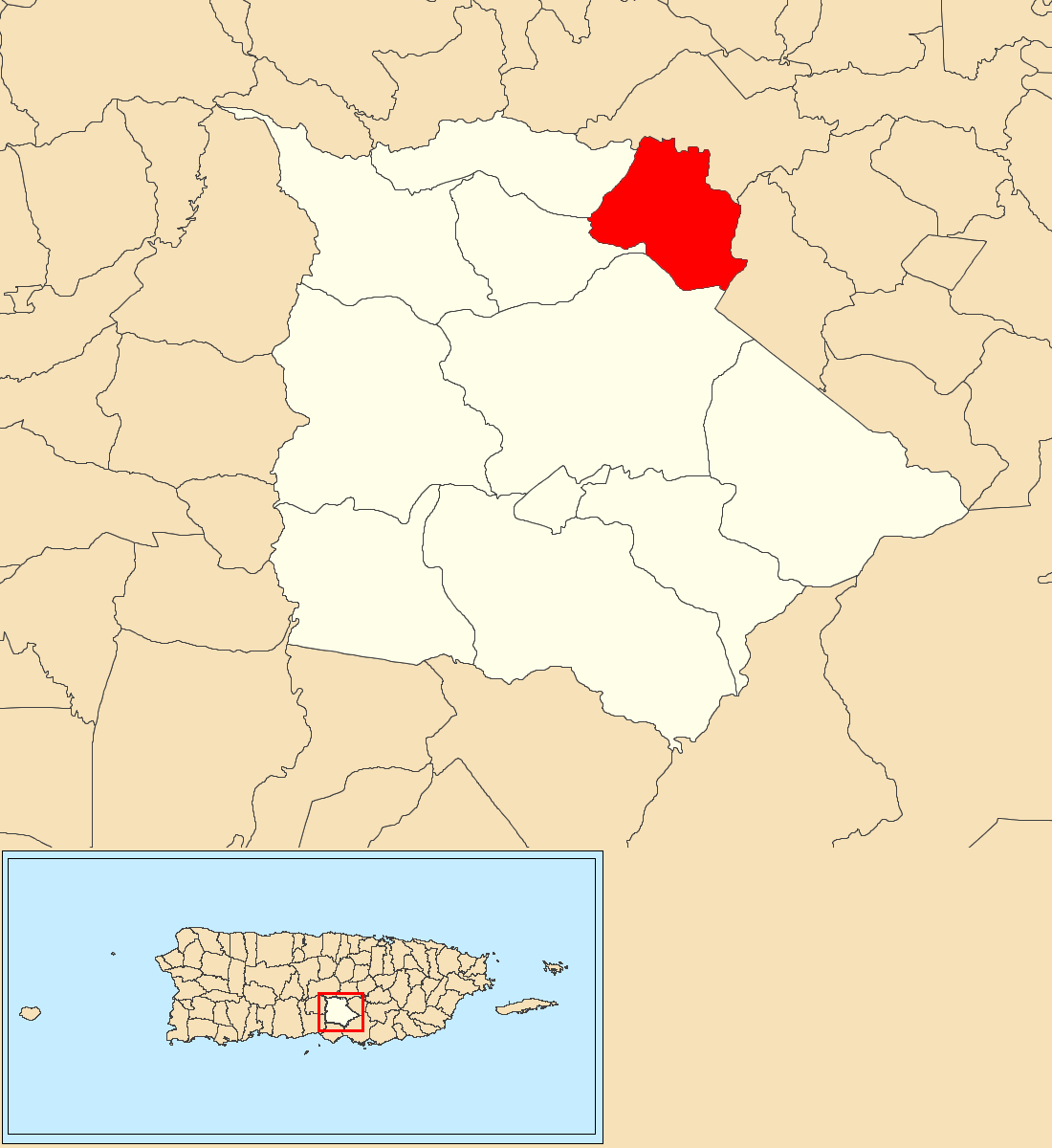
- Location of Pulguillas within the municipality of Coamo shown in red

- Location of Puerto Rico
- Coordinates: 18°08′57″N 66°19′52″W
- Commonwealth: Puerto Rico
- Municipality: Coamo

Area
  - Total: 4.02 sq mi (10.4 km^{2})
  - Land: 4.02 sq mi (10.4 km^{2})
  - Water: 0 sq mi (0 km^{2})
- Elevation: 2,612 ft (796 m)

Population (2010)
  - Total: 1,205
  - Density: 299.8/sq mi (115.8/km^{2})
- Source: 2010 Census
- Time zone: UTC−4 (AST)
- ZIP Code: 00769
- Area code: 787/939

Pulguillas is a barrio in the municipality of Coamo, Puerto Rico. Its population in 2010 was 1,205.

== History ==
Pulguillas was in Spain's gazetteers until Puerto Rico was ceded by Spain in the aftermath of the Spanish–American War under the terms of the Treaty of Paris of 1898 and became an unincorporated territory of the United States. In 1899, the United States Department of War conducted a census of Puerto Rico finding that the population of Pulguillas barrio was 1,143.

Historical population
Census	Pop.	Note	%±
1900	1,143		—
1910	1,048		−8.3%
1920	1,140		8.8%
1930	1,147		0.6%
1940	1,356		18.2%
1950	1,591		17.3%
1960	1,276		−19.8%
1970	1,156		−9.4%
1980	1,583		36.9%
1990	1,162		−26.6%
2000	1,131		−2.7%
2010	1,205		6.5%
U.S. Decennial Census; 1899 (shown as 1900) 1910-1930; 1930-1950 1980-2000 2010

== See also ==
- List of communities in Puerto Rico
