= Bauta Abajo =

Barrio of Orocovis, Puerto Rico

- Barrio
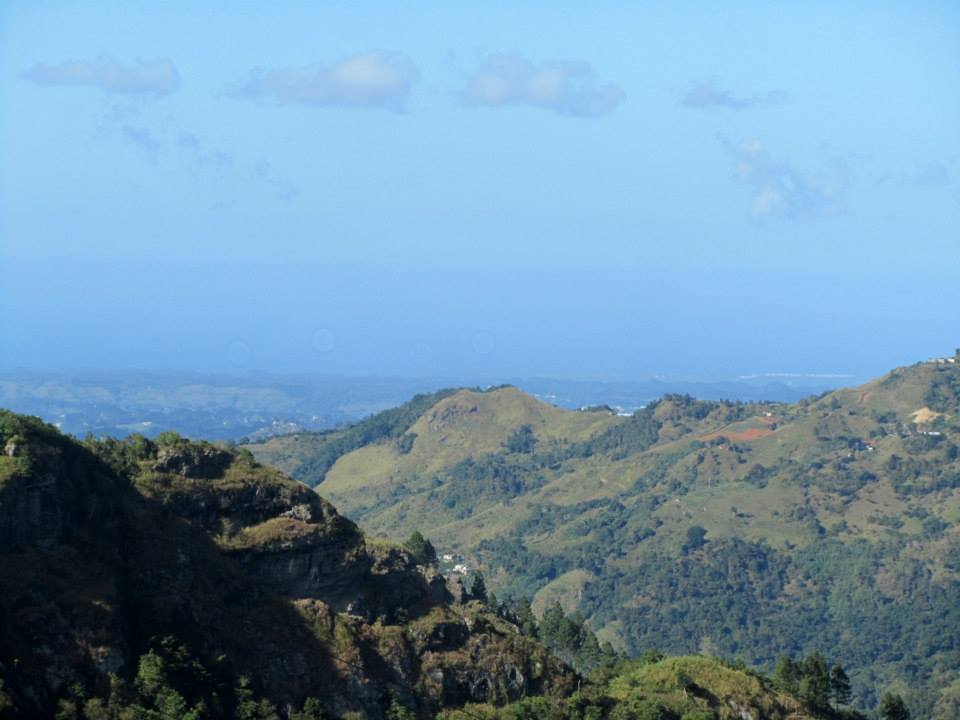
- View from Bauta Abajo

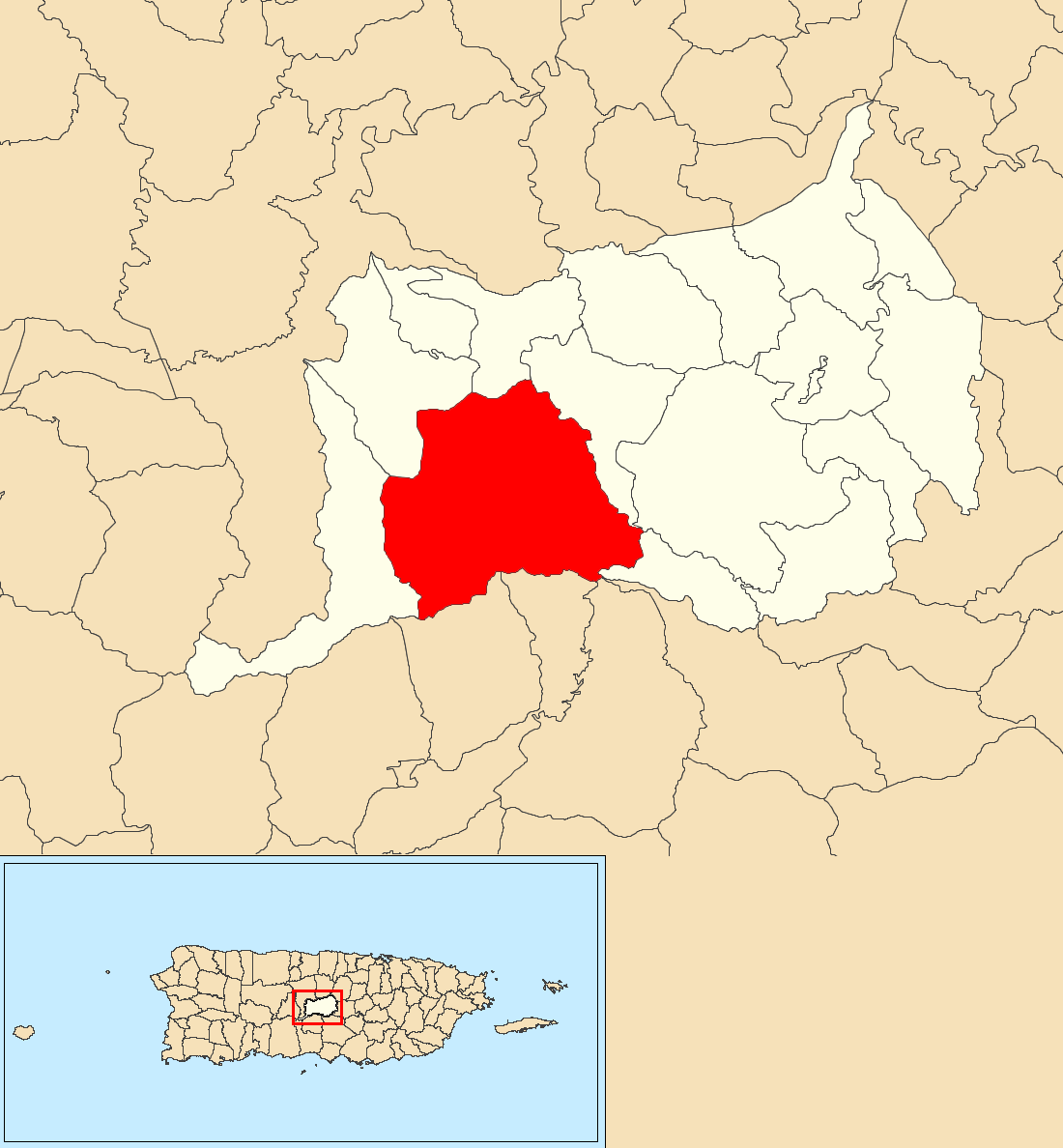
- Location of Bauta Abajo within the municipality of Orocovis shown in red

- Location of Puerto Rico
- Coordinates: 18°11′40″N 66°28′04″W
- Commonwealth: Puerto Rico
- Municipality: Orocovis

Area
  - Total: 10.46 sq mi (27.1 km^{2})
  - Land: 10.35 sq mi (26.8 km^{2})
  - Water: 0.11 sq mi (0.28 km^{2})
- Elevation: 2,992 ft (912 m)

Population (2010)
  - Total: 1,516
  - Density: 146.5/sq mi (56.6/km^{2})
- Source: 2010 Census
- Time zone: UTC−4 (AST)
- ZIP Code: 00720
- Area code: 787/939

Bauta Abajo is a barrio in the municipality of Orocovis, Puerto Rico. Its population in 2010 was 1,516.

== Sectors ==
Barrios (which are, in contemporary times, roughly comparable to minor civil divisions) in turn are further subdivided into smaller local populated place areas/units called sectores (sectors in English). The types of sectores may vary, from normally sector to urbanización to reparto to barriada to residencial, among others.

The following sectors are in Bauta Abajo barrio:

Sector El Cementerio, Sector El Lago, Sector Guaraguaíto, Sector La Escuela, Sector La Francia, Sector La Muela, Sector La Sierra, Sector Matrullas, Sector San Miguel, Sector Taita, and Sector Toñingo.

== History ==
Bauta Abajo was in Spain's gazetteers until Puerto Rico was ceded by Spain in the aftermath of the Spanish–American War under the terms of the Treaty of Paris of 1898 and became an unincorporated territory of the United States. In 1899, the United States Department of War conducted a census of Puerto Rico finding that the population of Bauta Abajo barrio was 1,603.

Historical population
Census	Pop.	Note	%±
1900	1,603		—
1910	1,729		7.9%
1920	2,026		17.2%
1930	1,599		−21.1%
1940	2,368		48.1%
1950	2,062		−12.9%
1960	1,727		−16.2%
1970	1,411		−18.3%
1980	1,330		−5.7%
1990	1,522		14.4%
2000	1,651		8.5%
2010	1,516		−8.2%
U.S. Decennial Census; 1899 (shown as 1900) 1910-1930; 1930-1950 1980-2000 2010

== See also ==
- List of communities in Puerto Rico
