= Puerto Rico Highway 510 =

Highway in Puerto Rico

Highway 510
- Ruta 510

Route information
- Maintained by Puerto Rico DTPW
- Length: 10.3 km (6.4 mi)

Major junctions
- South end: PR-1 in Capitanejo
- PR-5510 in Sabana Llana; PR-5509 in Sabana Llana; PR-149 in Amuelas; PR-584 in Amuelas
- North end: PR-14 in Tijeras

Location
- Country: United States
- Territory: Puerto Rico
- Municipalities: Ponce, Juana Díaz

Highway system
- Roads in Puerto Rico; List
← PR-506	→ PR-511
← PR-5506	PR-5510	→ PR-5525

Puerto Rico Highway 510 (PR-510) is a tertiary highway in southern Puerto Rico. The road runs north to south in a general south-southwestern direction. The road connects PR-1 in Barrio Capitanejo, Ponce, to PR-14 in the town of Juana Díaz. Portions of the Juana Díaz portion of the road were damaged in September 2017 by Hurricane Maria.

Puerto Rico Highway 510 by municipality

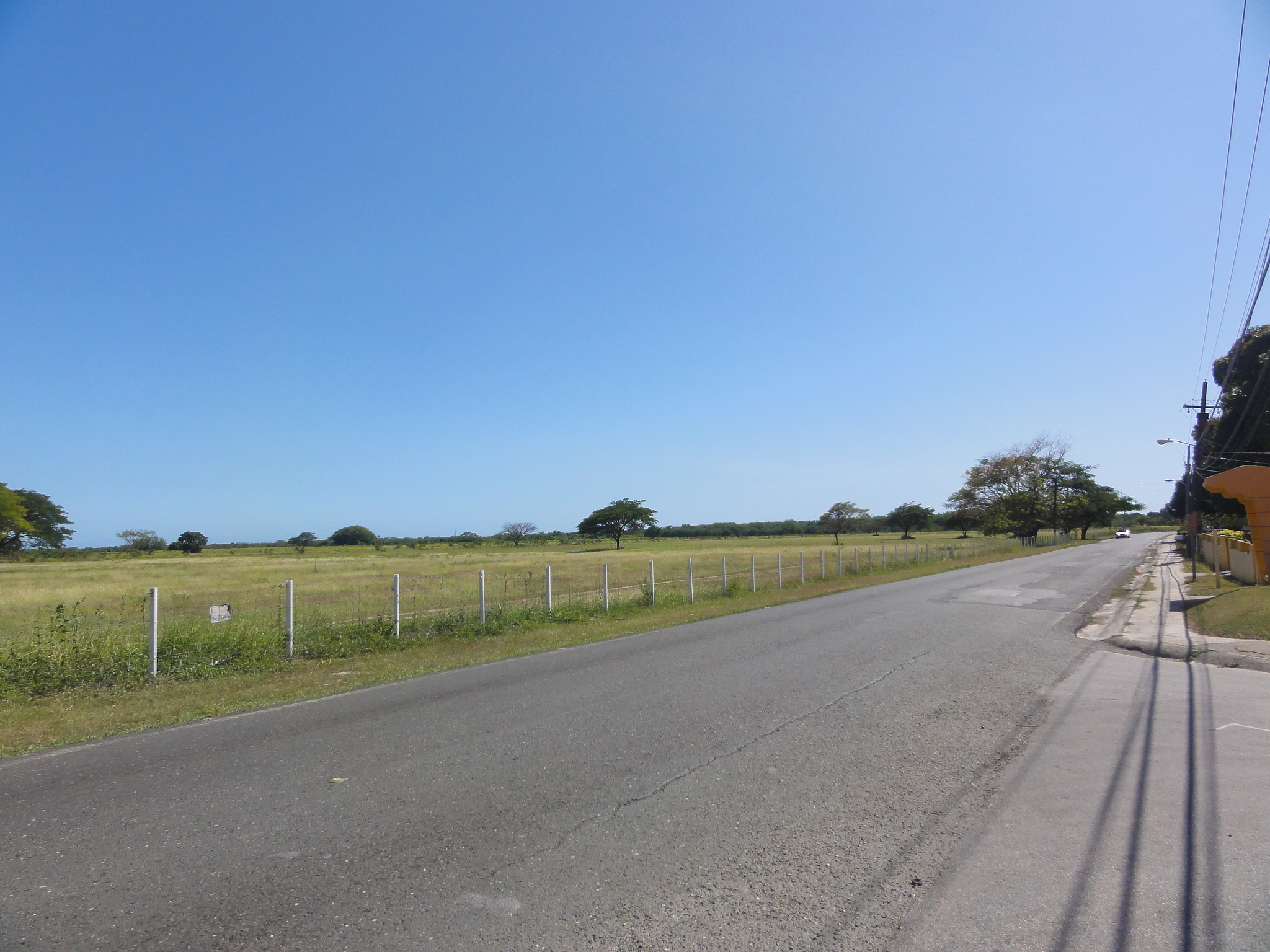
A stretch in Barrio Capitanejo, Ponce, looking south

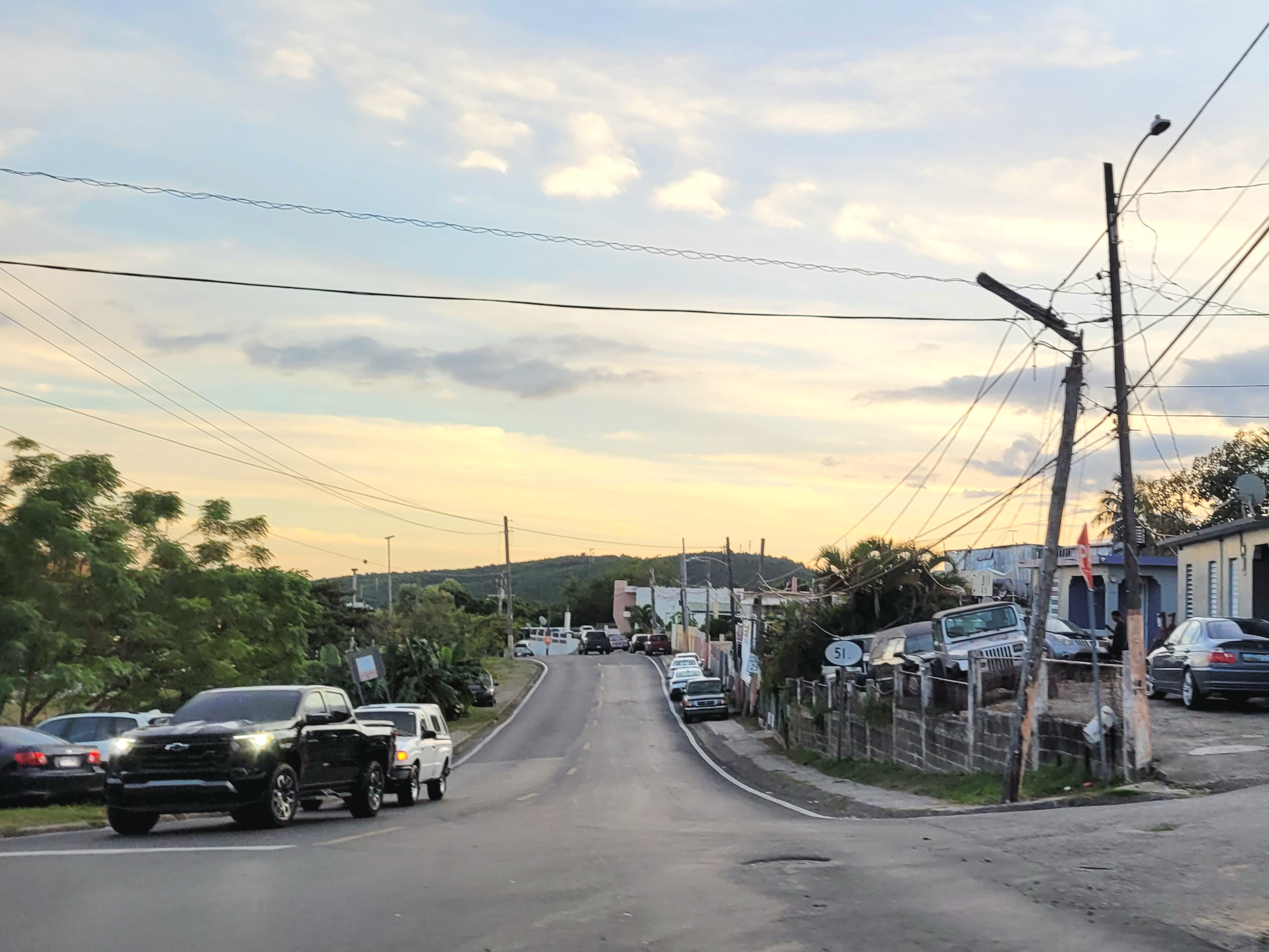
Southbound beginning in Barrio Tijeras, Juana Díaz, leaving PR-14

== Major intersections ==
Municipality	Location	km	mi	Destinations	Notes
Ponce	Capitanejo	0.0	0.0	PR-1 – Ponce, Santa Isabel	Southern terminus of PR-510
Juana Díaz	Sabana Llana	1.1– 1.2	0.68– 0.75	PR-5510 – Capitanejo	
Juana Díaz	Sabana Llana	2.3– 2.4	1.4– 1.5	PR-5509 – Sabana Llana	
Juana Díaz	Amuelas	5.3 68.3 (Note: Kilometer markers represent the distance along PR-149 rather than PR-510.)	3.3 42.4	PR-149 – Juana Díaz, Villalba	Northern terminus of PR-149 concurrency
Juana Díaz	Amuelas	68.5 5.4	42.6 3.4	PR-149 – Cintrona	Southern terminus of PR-149 concurrency
Juana Díaz	Amuelas	9.5	5.9	PR-584 (Avenida Víctor Cruz) – Juana Díaz, Ponce	
Juana Díaz	Tijeras	10.3	6.4	PR-14 (Carretera Central) – Juana Díaz, Coamo	Northern terminus of PR-510
1.000 mi = 1.609 km; 1.000 km = 0.621 mi: Concurrency terminus

== Related route ==
Highway 5510
- Location: Ponce – Juana Díaz
- Length: 1.4 km (0.87 mi)

Puerto Rico Highway 5510 (PR-5510) is a spur route located in between Ponce and Juana Díaz. It begins at PR-1 in Barrio Capitanejo and ends at its junction with PR-510 in Barrio Sabana Llana.

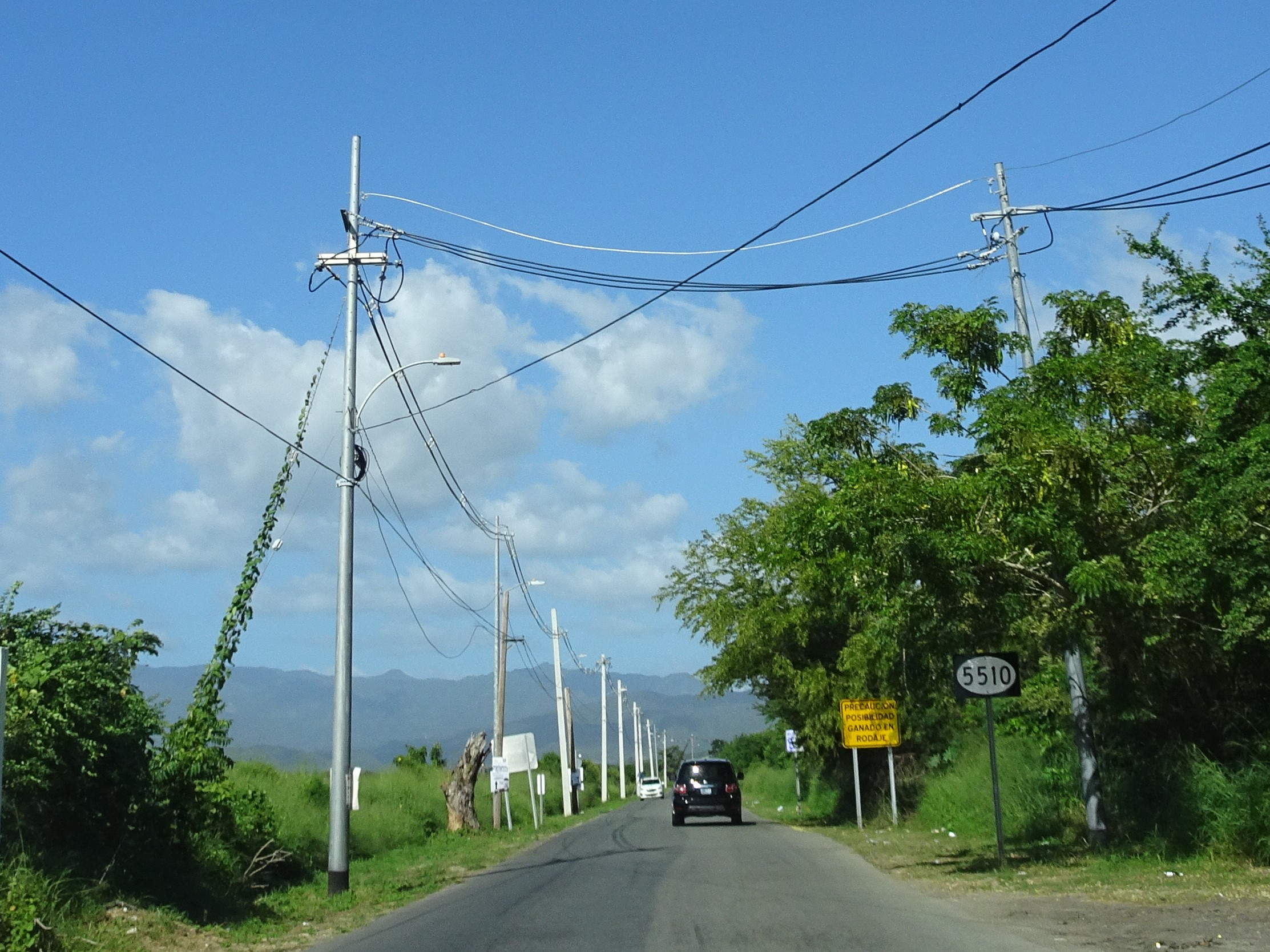
Puerto Rico Highway 5510 north in Barrio Capitanejo

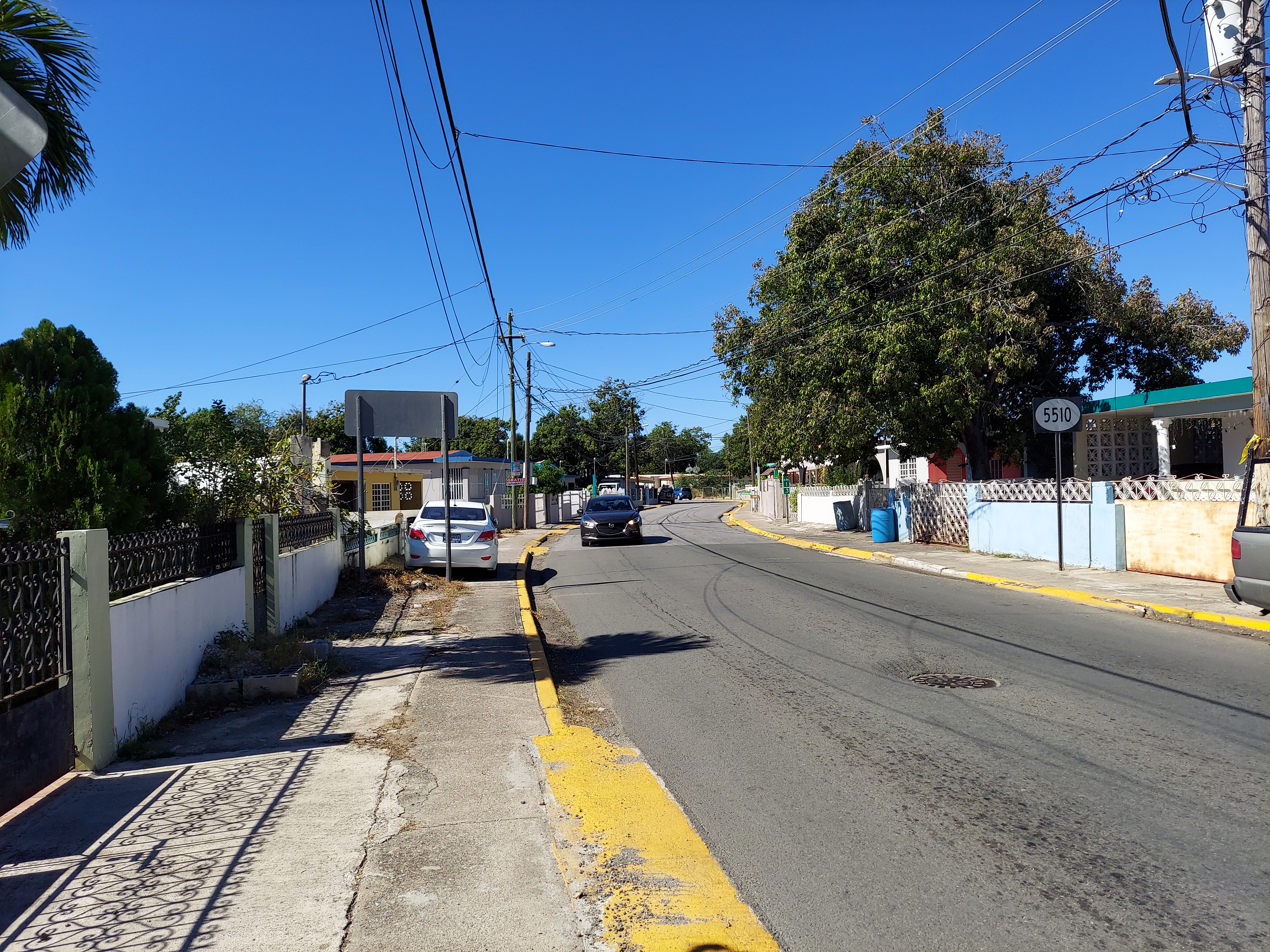
A stretch of PR-5510 in Barrio Capitanejo, looking south

Municipality	Location	km	mi	Destinations	Notes
Ponce	Capitanejo	0.0	0.0	PR-1 – Ponce, Santa Isabel	Southern terminus of PR-5510
Juana Díaz	Sabana Llana	1.4	0.87	PR-510 – Juana Díaz	Northern terminus of PR-5510
1.000 mi = 1.609 km; 1.000 km = 0.621 mi

== See also ==
- List of highways in Ponce, Puerto Rico
