= Capitanejo, Ponce, Puerto Rico =

Barrio of Puerto Rico

Capitanejo
- Barrio
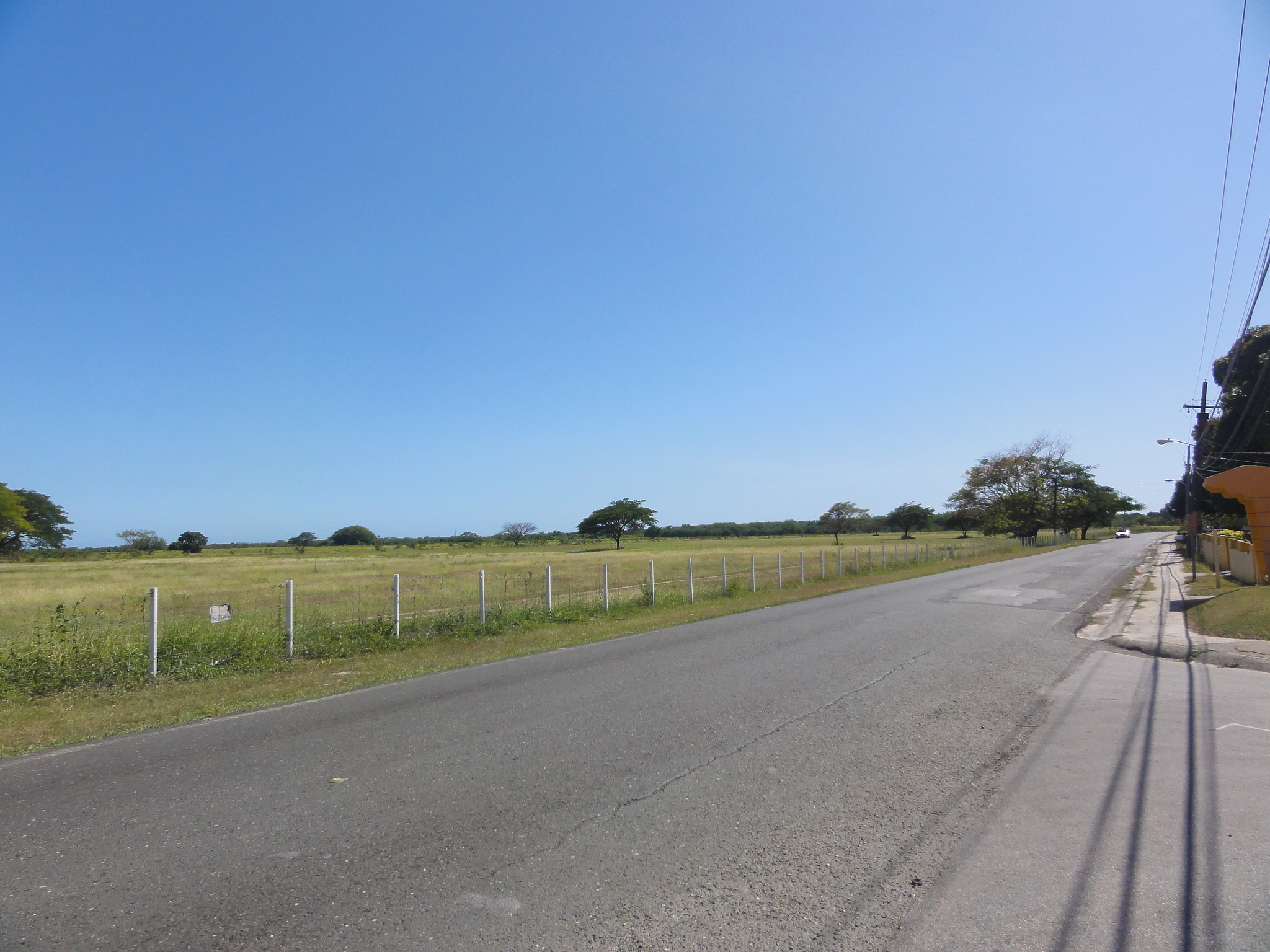
- A rural area in Barrio Capitanejo, Ponce, Puerto Rico

- Location of barrio Capitanejo within the municipality of Ponce

- Location of Puerto Rico
- Coordinates: 17°59′17″N 66°32′50″W
- Commonwealth: Puerto Rico
- Municipality: Ponce

Area
  - Total: 4.82 sq mi (12.5 km^{2})
  - Land: 3.93 sq mi (10.2 km^{2})
  - Water: 0.89 sq mi (2.3 km^{2})
- Elevation: 10 ft (3.0 m)

Population (2010)
  - Total: 1,011
  - Density: 257.3/sq mi (99.3/km^{2})
- Source: 2010 Census
- Time zone: UTC−4 (AST)

Capitanejo is one of the 31 barrios of the municipality of Ponce, Puerto Rico. Along with Anón, Coto Laurel, Guaraguao, Quebrada Limón, Real, San Patricio, and Marueño, and the coastal barrio of Canas, Capitanejo is one of the municipality's nine bordering barrios. It borders the municipality of Juana Diaz. Along with Playa, Bucana, Vayas and Canas, Capitanejo is also one of Ponce's five coastal barrios. Together with Vayas, Capitanejo is also one of two rural coastal barrios in the municipality. It was founded in 1822.

== Location ==
Capitanejo is a rural, coastal barrio located in the southeastern section of the municipality, southeast of the city of Ponce. The toponymy, or origin of the name, makes reference to the proper noun of a local junior or lieutenant commander below a cacique, or a local junior commander subject to a superior authority. The barrio formed from a community of tobacco plant growers dating back to the 1680s.

== Boundaries ==
Capitanejo is bounded on the north by Río Inabón and barrio Sabana Llana of the municipality of Juana Díaz, on the south by the Caribbean Sea, on the west by Río Inabón, and on the east by Río Jacaguas.

In terms of barrio-to-barrio boundaries, Capitanejo is bounded on the north by barrio Vayas, in the south by the Caribbean Sea, in the west by barrio Vayas, and in the east by barrios Sabana Llana and Capitanejo of the municipality of Juana Díaz. Capitanejo has the distinction of being the only one of Ponce's 31 barrios that borders a barrio in another municipality with the same name.

== Features and demographics ==
The communities of La Fe, La Plena, La Cuarta, Buyones, and Tiburones are located in barrio Capitanejo.

Capitanejo has 3.95 square miles (10 km^{2}) of land area and 0.88 square miles (2.3 km^{2}) of water area. In 2000, the population of Capitanejo was 1,404 persons, and it had a density of 355 persons per square mile.

In 2010, the population of Capitanejo was 1,011 persons, and it had a density of 257.3 persons per square mile.

The main roads serving Barrio Capitanejo are PR-1 and PR-510.

Historical population
Census	Pop.	Note	%±
1900	1,161		—
1910	1,537		32.4%
1920	1,471		−4.3%
1930	1,433		−2.6%
1940	688		−52.0%
1950	1,621		135.6%
1960	1,340		−17.3%
1970	1,343		0.2%
1980	1,409		4.9%
1990	1,089		−22.7%
2000	1,404		28.9%
2010	1,011		−28.0%
U.S. Decennial Census; 1899 (shown as 1900) 1910-1930; 1930-1950 1960 1980-2000 2010

== Notable landmarks ==
Capitanejo has the second shortest coastline of all of Ponce's five coastal barrios, after Bucaná.

== See also ==
- List of communities in Puerto Rico
