= Héctor Tricoche =

Puerto Rican salsa singer-songwriter (1955–2022)

- Born: Héctor Noel Tricoche Albertorio; July 29, 1955; Juana Díaz, Puerto Rico
- Died: July 17, 2022 (aged 66) Springfield, Massachusetts
- Genres: Salsa, Balada
- Occupations: singer, songwriter
- Labels: TH-Rodven, Bat Discos, Protel Records, DM Productions, Machete Music

Héctor Tricoche (July 29, 1955 – July 17, 2022) was a Puerto Rican salsa singer-songwriter. Born in Juana Diaz PR. He was a member of Tommy Olivencia's band. and was featured as the lead vocals on the hits like "Lobo Domesticado", "Periquito Pin Pin", and "12 Rosas". Tricoche left the band and released his debut solo album Clase Aparte in 1990. He scored his first top-ten hit on the Billboard Tropical Airplay chart with "Mujer Prohibida".

== Discography ==
- Motorízame (1991)
- A Corazón Abierto (1993)
- In it for Me (1994)
- Oro Salsero 20 Exitos CD1 + CD2 (1994)
- Here I am (1995)
- Hector Tricoche Show (Live 1996)
- New Dawn (1997)
- Rumbero (2005)
- The Greatest Ever Salsa CD1 + CD2 (2008)

== Billboard Hot Latin Songs ==
- Soy Culpable (#9)
- Hacer el Amor (#21)
- Ese Soy Yo (#26)
- Mujer Prohibida (#28)
