= Río Cañas Abajo, Juana Díaz, Puerto Rico =

Barrio of Puerto Rico

Río Cañas Abajo
- Barrio
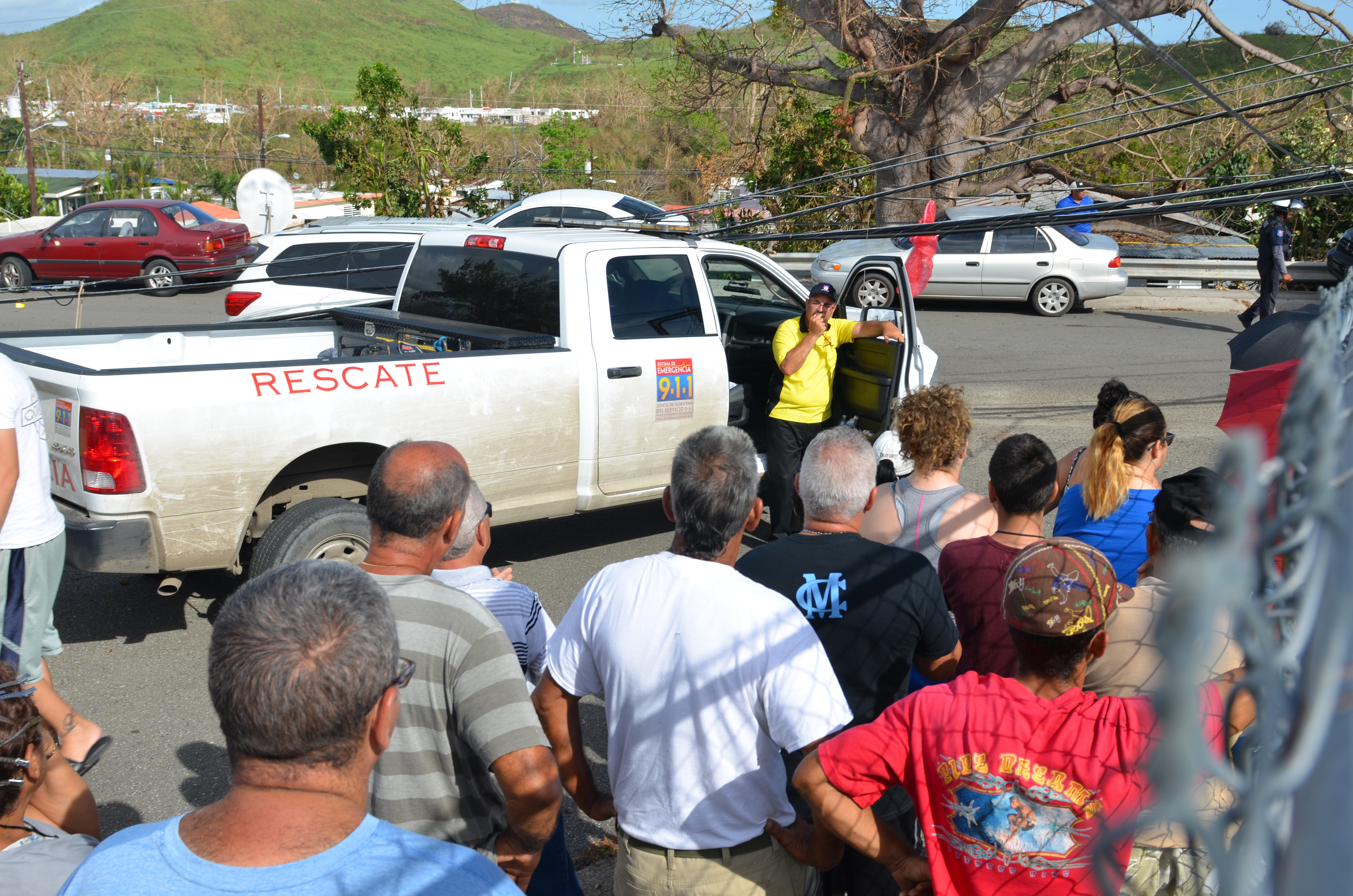
- Residents of Río Cañas Abajo after Hurricane Maria in 2017

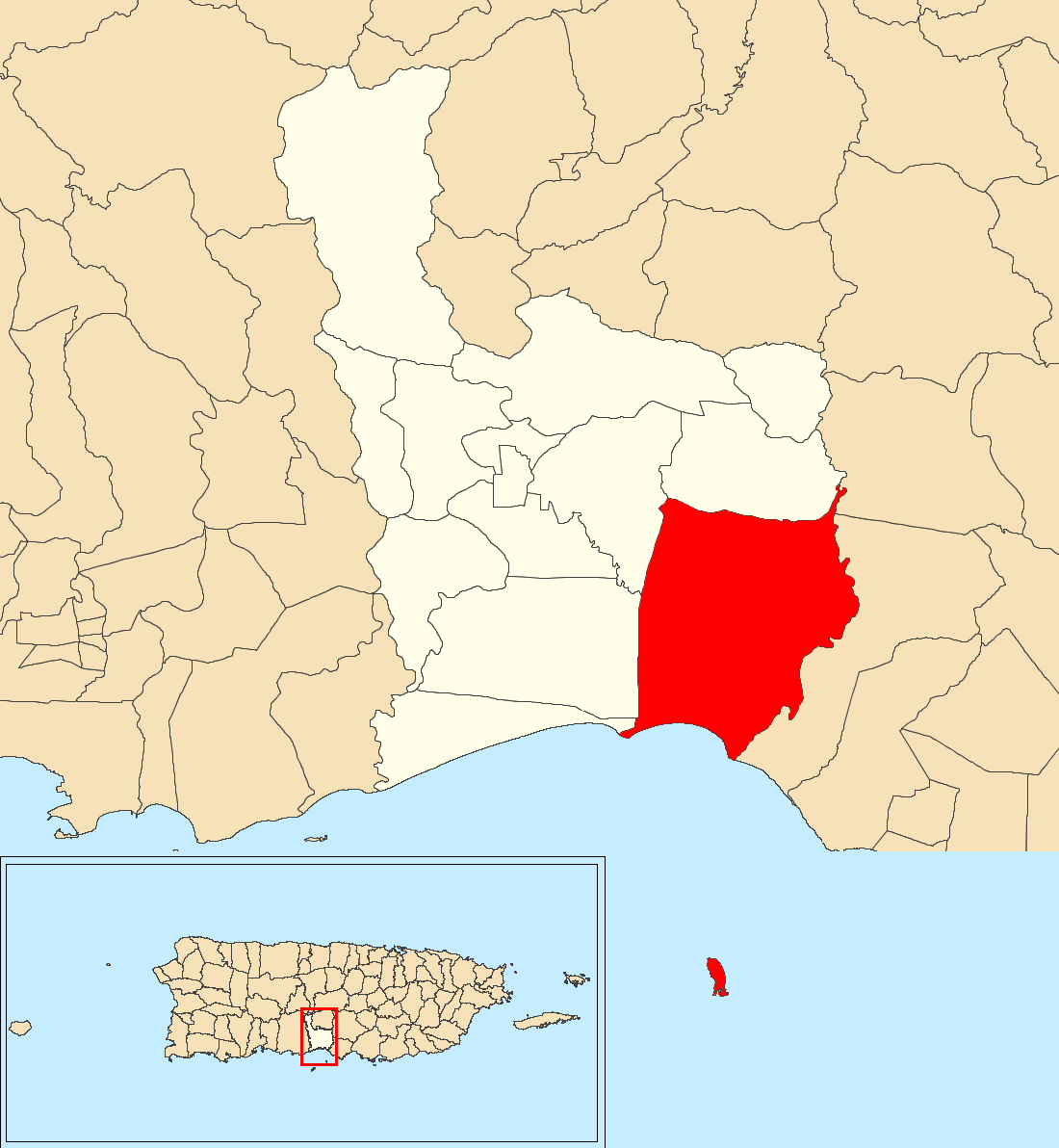
- Location of Río Cañas Abajo within the municipality of Juana Díaz shown in red

- Location of Puerto Rico
- Coordinates: 17°59′27″N 66°28′10″W
- Commonwealth: Puerto Rico
- Municipality: Juana Díaz

Area
  - Total: 22.42 sq mi (58.1 km^{2})
  - Land: 11.21 sq mi (29.0 km^{2})
  - Water: 11.21 sq mi (29.0 km^{2})
- Elevation: 0 ft (0 m)

Population (2010)
  - Total: 2,848
  - Density: 254.1/sq mi (98.1/km^{2})
- Source: 2010 Census
- Time zone: UTC−4 (AST)
- Postal code: 00795
- Area code: 787/939

Río Cañas Abajo is a barrio in the municipality of Juana Díaz, Puerto Rico. Its population in 2010 was 2,848.

== History ==
Río Cañas Abajo was in Spain's gazetteers until Puerto Rico was ceded by Spain in the aftermath of the Spanish–American War under the terms of the Treaty of Paris of 1898 and became an unincorporated territory of the United States. In 1899, the United States Department of War conducted a census of Puerto Rico finding that the population of Río Cañas Abajo barrio was 1,066.

Historical population
Census	Pop.	Note	%±
1900	1,066		—
1910	1,294		21.4%
1920	1,405		8.6%
1930	1,550		10.3%
1940	2,144		38.3%
1950	2,042		−4.8%
1960	2,030		−0.6%
1970	2,049		0.9%
1980	2,377		16.0%
1990	2,458		3.4%
2000	2,323		−5.5%
2010	2,848		22.6%
U.S. Decennial Census; 1899 (shown as 1900) 1910-1930; 1930-1950 1980-2000 2010

== Hurricane Maria ==
Like the rest of the island, residents of Río Cañas Abajo faced hardship after Hurricane Maria struck Puerto Rico on September 20, 2017, when they were left with destroyed infrastructure and no electrical power for months.

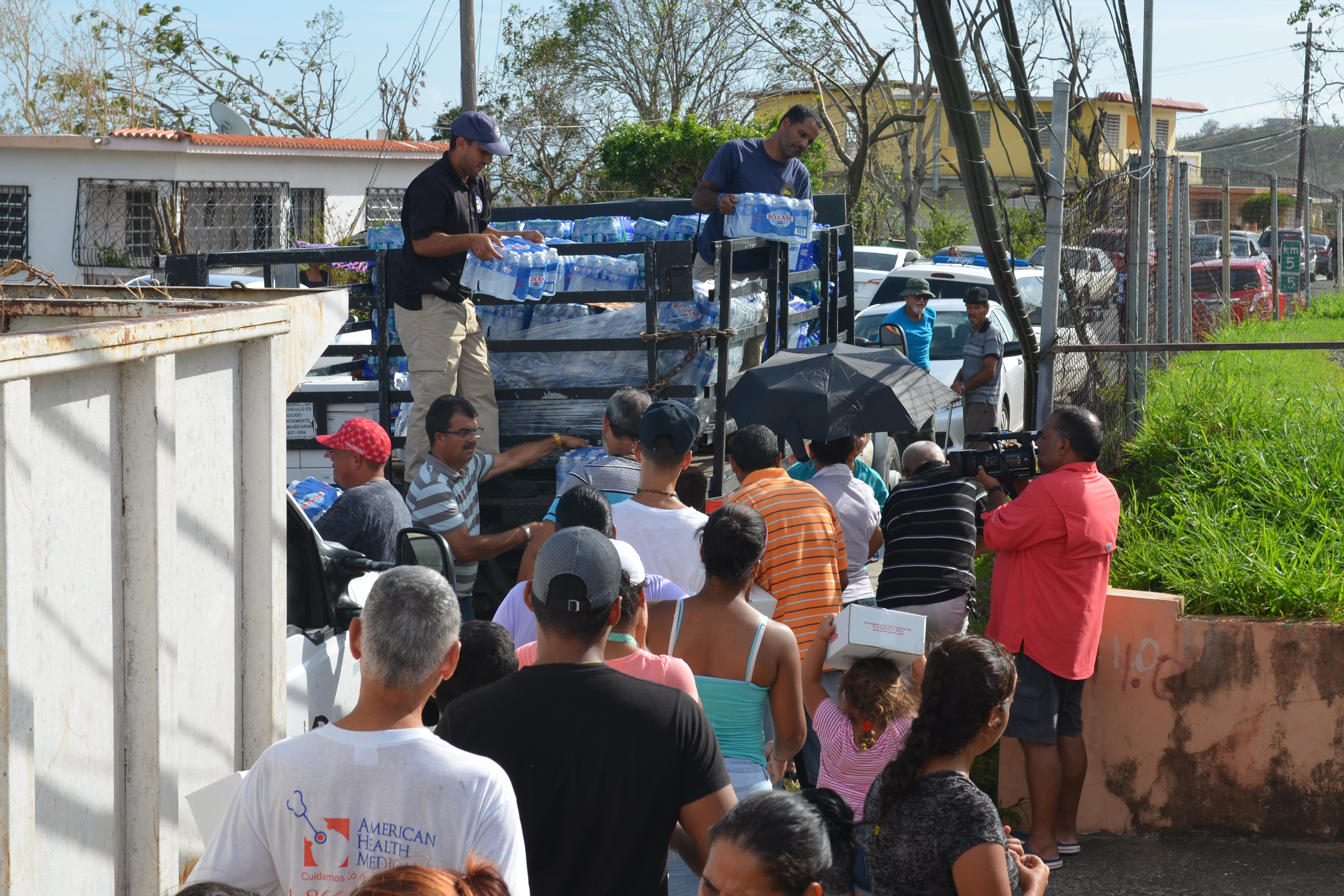
Relief efforts in Río Cañas Abajo after Hurricane Maria

== See also ==
- List of communities in Puerto Rico
