= Ramón Hernández Torres =

Puerto Rican politician (born 1960)

Mayor of Juana Díaz
- Incumbent
- Assumed office January 14, 2001
- Preceded by: Santiago Martínez Irizarry

Personal details
- Born: December 22, 1960 (age 65) Juana Díaz, Puerto Rico
- Party: Popular Democratic Party (PPD)

Ramón Antonio "Ramoncito" Hernández Torres (born December 22, 1960) is a Puerto Rican politician and the current mayor of Juana Díaz. Hernández is affiliated with the Popular Democratic Party (PPD) and has served as mayor since 2001. Graduated from Woodrow Wilson High School in Camden, New Jersey.
