= Juana Díaz barrio-pueblo =

Historical and administrative center (seat) of Juana Díaz, Puerto Rico

Juana Díaz barrio-pueblo Pueblo de Juana Díaz
- Municipality Seat
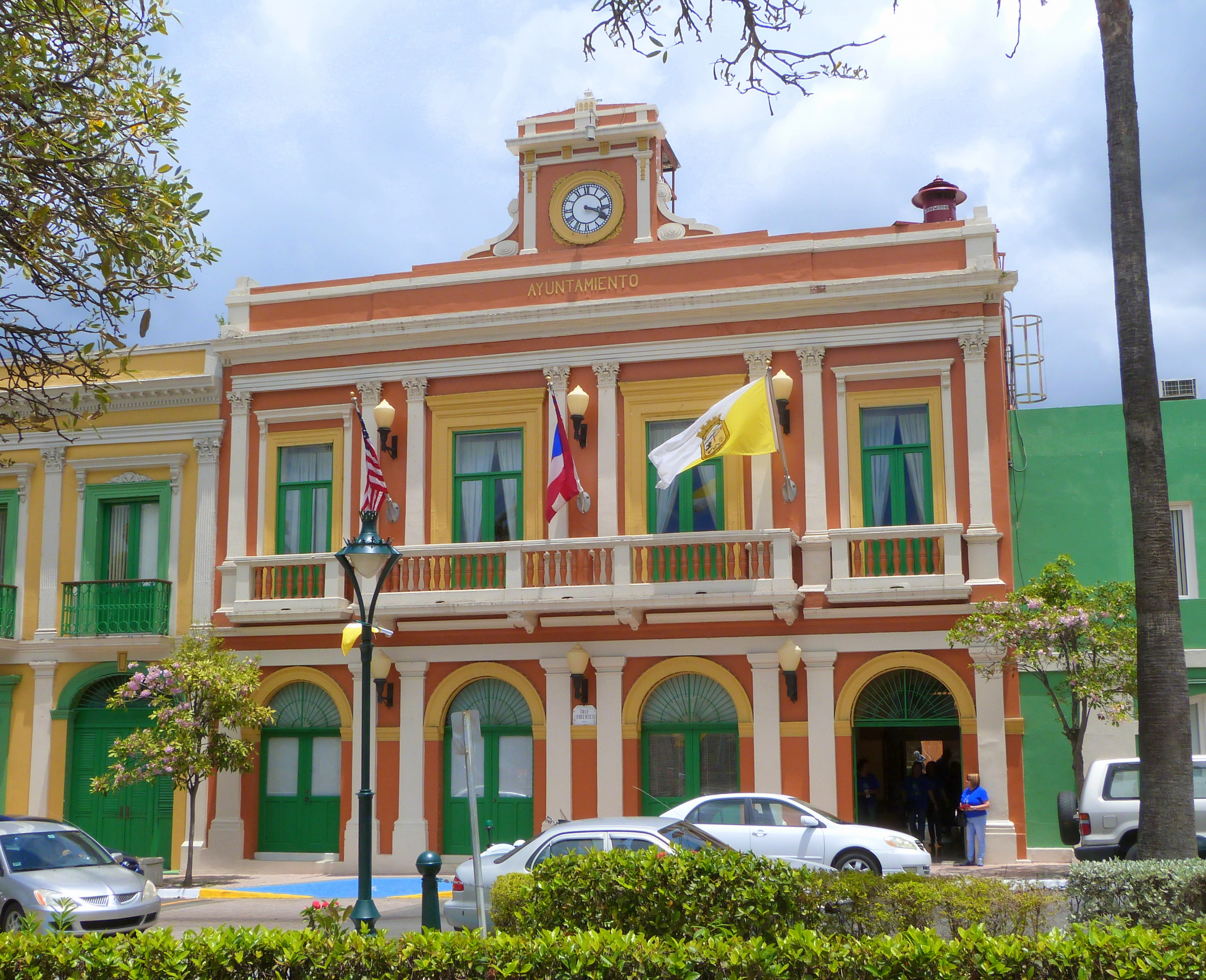
- Town Hall of Juana Díaz

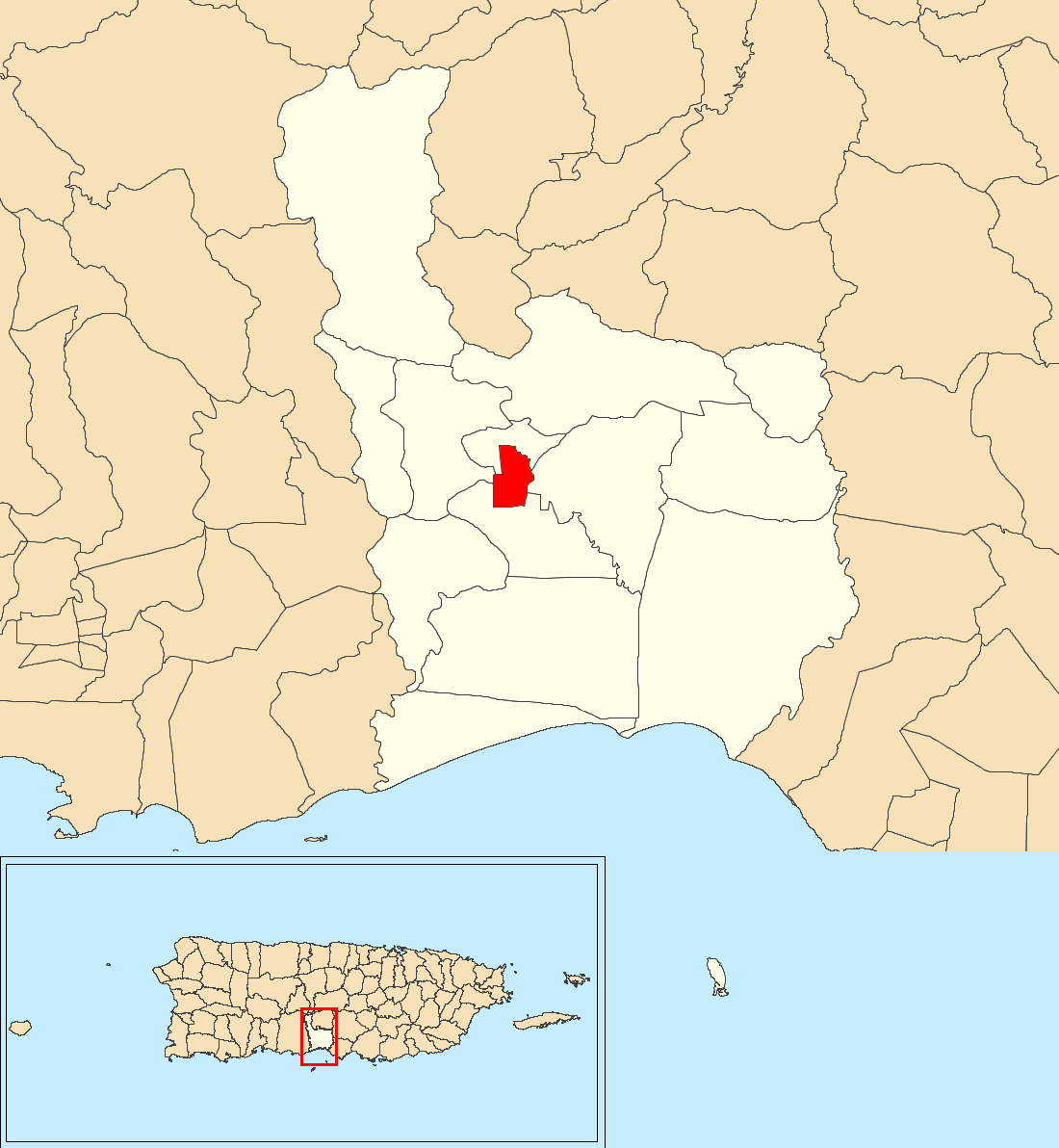
- Location of Juana Díaz barrio-pueblo within the municipality of Juana Díaz shown in red

- Location of Puerto Rico
- Coordinates: 18°03′05″N 66°30′24″W
- Commonwealth: Puerto Rico
- Municipality: Juana Díaz

Area
  - Total: 0.51 sq mi (1.3 km^{2})
  - Land: 0.51 sq mi (1.3 km^{2})
  - Water: 0.00 sq mi (0 km^{2})
- Elevation: 161 ft (49 m)

Population (2010)
  - Total: 3,977
  - Density: 7,798/sq mi (3,011/km^{2})
- Source: 2010 Census
- Time zone: UTC−4 (AST)
- Postal code: 00795
- Area code: 787/939

Juana Díaz barrio-pueblo is a barrio and the administrative center (seat) of Juana Díaz, a municipality of Puerto Rico. Its population in 2010 was 3,977.

As was customary in Spain, in Puerto Rico, the municipality has a barrio called pueblo which contains a central plaza, the municipal buildings (city hall), and a Catholic church. Fiestas patronales (patron saint festivals) are held in the central plaza every year.

Historical population
Census	Pop.	Note	%±
1900	2,246		—
1910	2,092		−6.9%
1920	2,211		5.7%
1930	2,466		11.5%
1940	3,931		59.4%
1950	4,743		20.7%
1960	4,618		−2.6%
1970	0		−100.0%
1980	5,557		—
1990	4,775		−14.1%
2000	4,555		−4.6%
2010	3,977		−12.7%
U.S. Decennial Census; 1899 (shown as 1900) 1910-1930; 1930-1950 1980-2000 2010

== The central plaza and its church ==
The central plaza, or square, is a place in the barrio-pueblo for official and unofficial recreational events and a place where people can gather and socialize from dusk to dawn. The Laws of the Indies, Spanish law, which regulated life in Puerto Rico in the early 19th century, stated the plaza's purpose was for "the parties" (celebrations, festivities) (Spanish: a propósito para las fiestas), and that the square should be proportionally large enough for the number of neighbors (Spanish: grandeza proporcionada al número de vecinos). These Spanish regulations also stated that the streets nearby should be comfortable portals for passersby, protecting them from the elements: sun and rain.

Located across the central plaza in Juana Díaz barrio-pueblo is the Parroquia San Ramón Nonato, a Roman Catholic church. The historic church was built in 1807.

The pueblo, as the barrio-pueblo is still called, is divided into north, east, west and south sections.

== Gallery ==
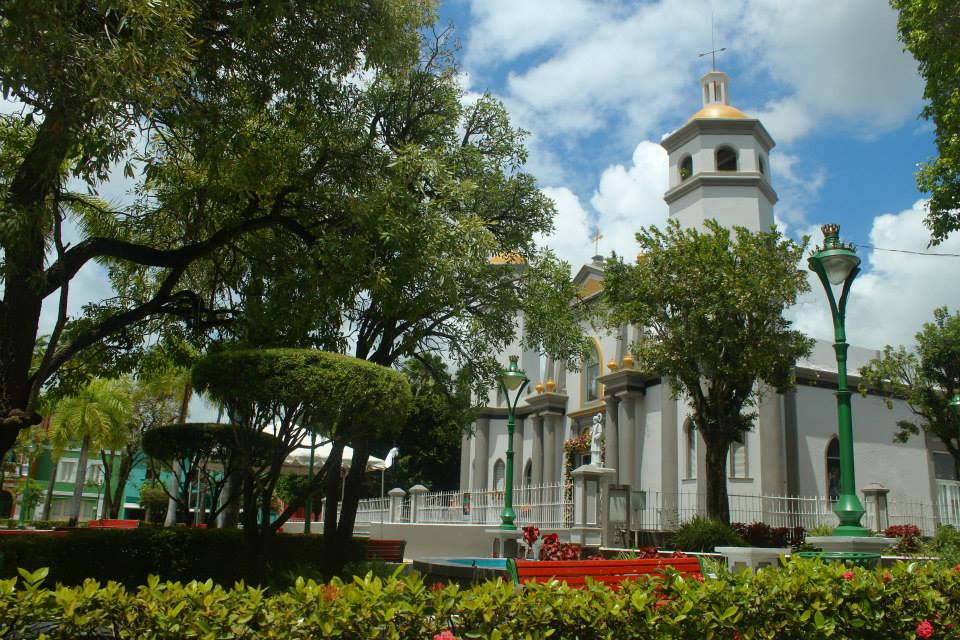
Parroquia San Ramón Nonato, a Catholic church in the central plaza

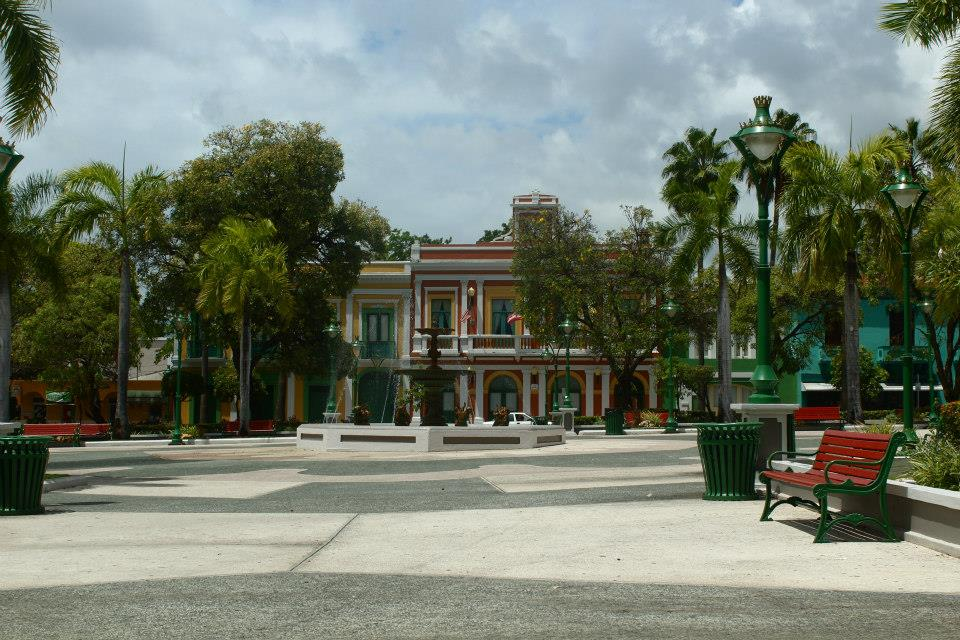
Central plaza with the city hall in the background

== See also ==
- List of communities in Puerto Rico
