= Callabo =

Barrio of Juana Díaz, Puerto Rico

- Barrio
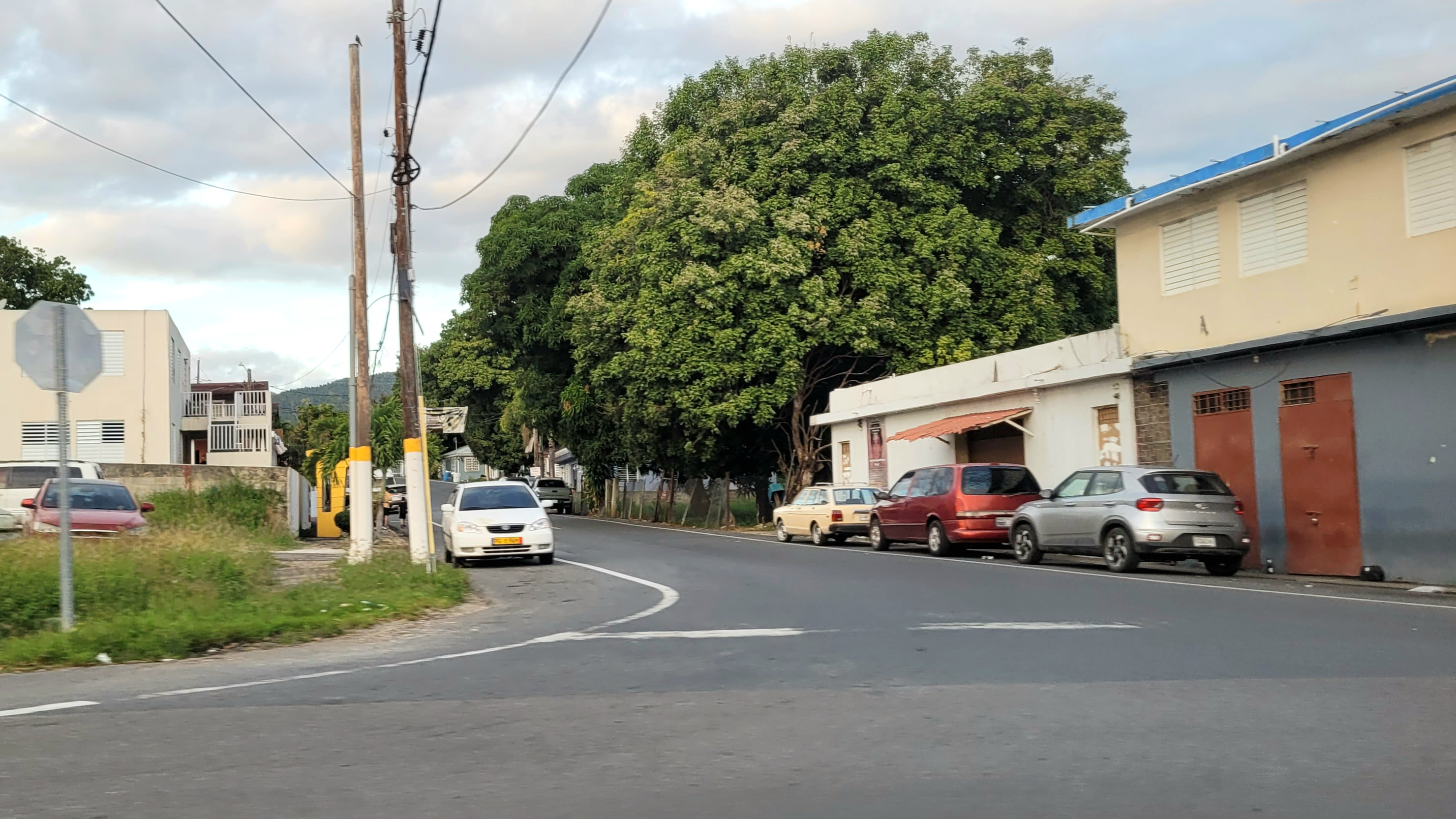
- Puerto Rico Highway 512 in Callabo

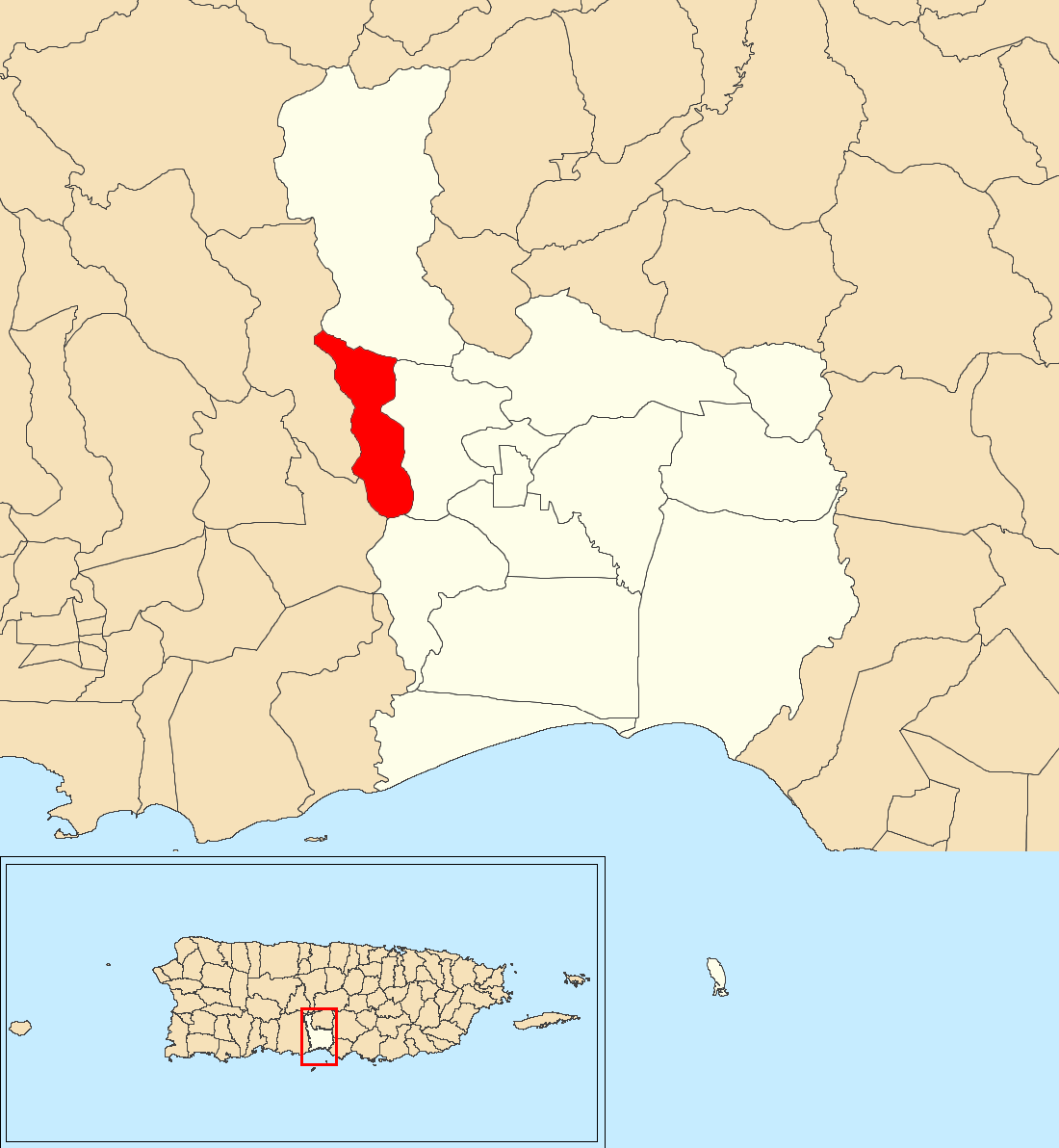
- Location of Callabo within the municipality of Juana Díaz shown in red

- Location of Puerto Rico
- Coordinates: 18°03′49″N 66°32′25″W
- Commonwealth: Puerto Rico
- Municipality: Juana Díaz

Area
  - Total: 2.110 sq mi (5.46 km^{2})
  - Land: 1.958 sq mi (5.07 km^{2})
  - Water: 0.152 sq mi (0.39 km^{2})
- Elevation: 348 ft (106 m)

Population (2010)
  - Total: 2,237
  - Density: 1,060.2/sq mi (409.3/km^{2})
- Source: 2010 Census
- Time zone: UTC−4 (AST)
- Postal code: 00795
- Area code: 787/939

Callabo is a barrio in the municipality of Juana Díaz, Puerto Rico. Its population in 2010 was 2,237.

== History ==
Callabo was in Spain's gazetteers until Puerto Rico was ceded by Spain in the aftermath of the Spanish–American War under the terms of the Treaty of Paris of 1898 and became an unincorporated territory of the United States. In 1899, the United States Department of War conducted a census of Puerto Rico finding that the combined population of Callabo and Jacaguas barrios was 936.

Historical population
Census	Pop.	Note	%±
1910	778		—
1920	797		2.4%
1930	823		3.3%
1940	992		20.5%
1950	1,201		21.1%
1960	1,186		−1.2%
1970	1,193		0.6%
1980	1,779		49.1%
1990	1,751		−1.6%
2000	2,206		26.0%
2010	2,237		1.4%
U.S. Decennial Census; 1900 (N/A) 1910-1930; 1930-1950 1980-2000 2010

== See also ==
- List of communities in Puerto Rico
