= Iglesia San Ramón Nonato =

Historic place in Juana Díaz, Puerto Rico

San Ramón Nonato Church
- Parish Church of San Juan Bautista y San Ramón Nonato
- Iglesia San Ramón Nonato
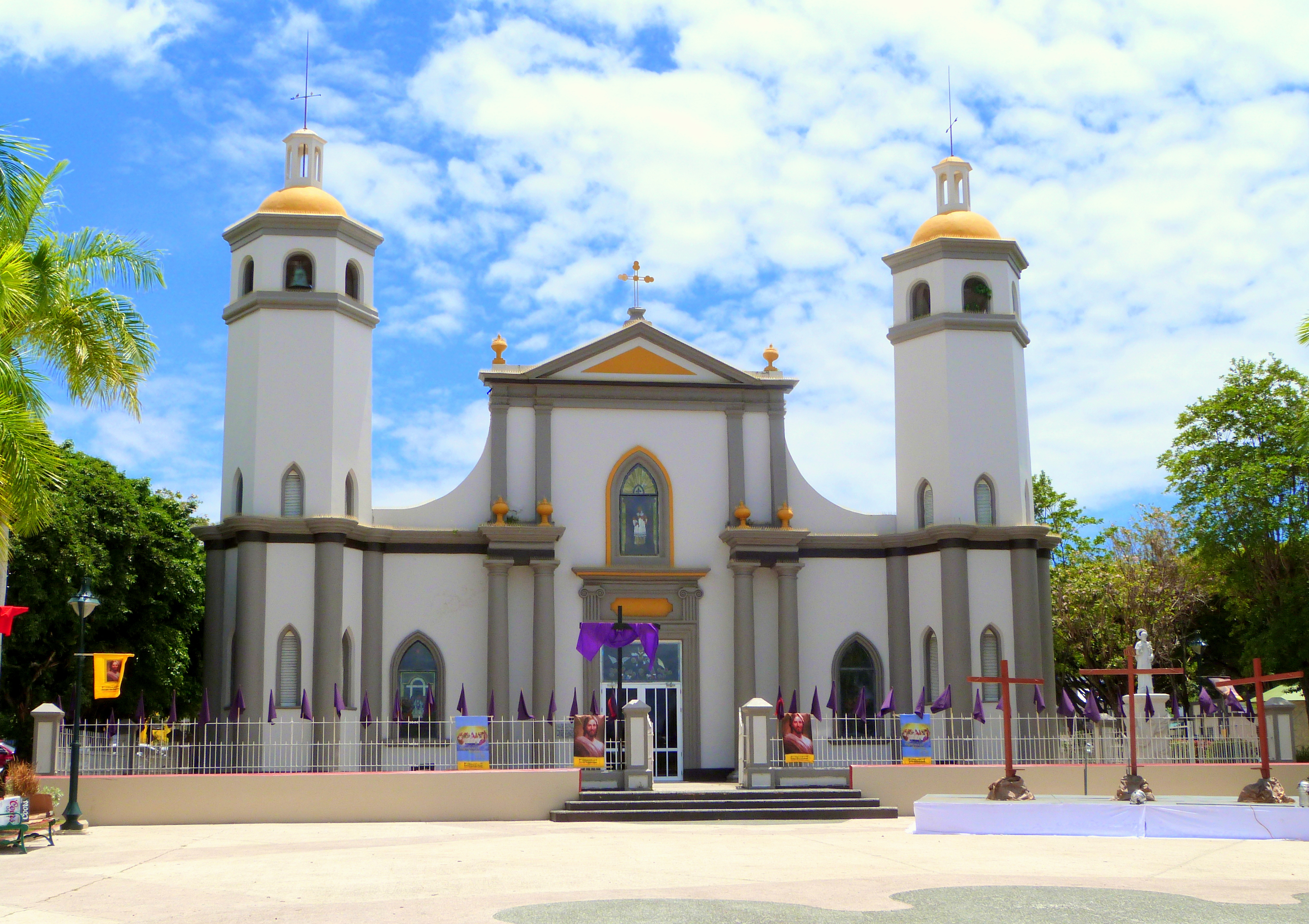
- The church in 2017

- Location in Puerto Rico
- 18°03′10″N 66°30′19″W
- Location: Juana Díaz Pueblo
- Address: Main plaza of Juana Díaz, Puerto Rico
- Country: Puerto Rico
- Denomination: Roman Catholic Church
- Website: psanramonnonatojuanadiaz.ecclesiared.com

History
- Status: Parish church
- Founded: 1798
- Dedication: Raymond Nonnatus and John the Baptist

Architecture
- Heritage designation: NRHP
- Designated: 1984
- Architectural type: Baroque
- Years built: 1798, 1807
- Completed: 1807

Administration
- Diocese: Ponce
- Church San Juan Bautista y San Ramón Nonato of Juana Diaz
- U.S. National Register of Historic Places
- Built: 1807
- MPS: Historic Churches of Puerto Rico MPS
- NRHP reference No.: 84000465
- Added to NRHP: December 10, 1984

The San Ramón Nonato Church (Spanish: Iglesia San Ramón Nonato), officially named Church of San Juan Bautista y San Ramón Nonato, is a historic Roman Catholic parish church in the town plaza of Juana Díaz, Puerto Rico.

== History ==
The parish was erected in 1798. The Baroque church building was built of plastered masonry starting in 1807 (Note: Construction began in 1807. A completion date is not stated in the available sources. Major elements (the north tower) were added possibly as late as 1895.) and underwent significant repairs over the years, including after the 1867 earthquake and during a 1970 project that included removal and replacement of the original roof. Nevertheless, the building retains most of its original design, construction, and materials, including masonry walls, towers, sacristies, interior arcades, dome, and wooden spiral stairway in the south tower. The church's placement in the town plaza and close to the town hall reflect the Crown-mandated urban design principles of the early 19th century. Important artworks in the church include wooden carvings of Saint John and the Sorrowful Mother, as well as a painting of the Crucifixion that may be the work of José Campeche.

The church building was entered on the U.S. National Register of Historic Places in 1984, and added to the Puerto Rico Register of Historic Sites and Zones in 2001.

== See also ==
- National Register of Historic Places listings in Juana Díaz, Puerto Rico
- Roman Catholic Diocese of Ponce
