= Tijeras, Juana Díaz, Puerto Rico =

Barrio of Puerto Rico

Tijeras
- Barrio
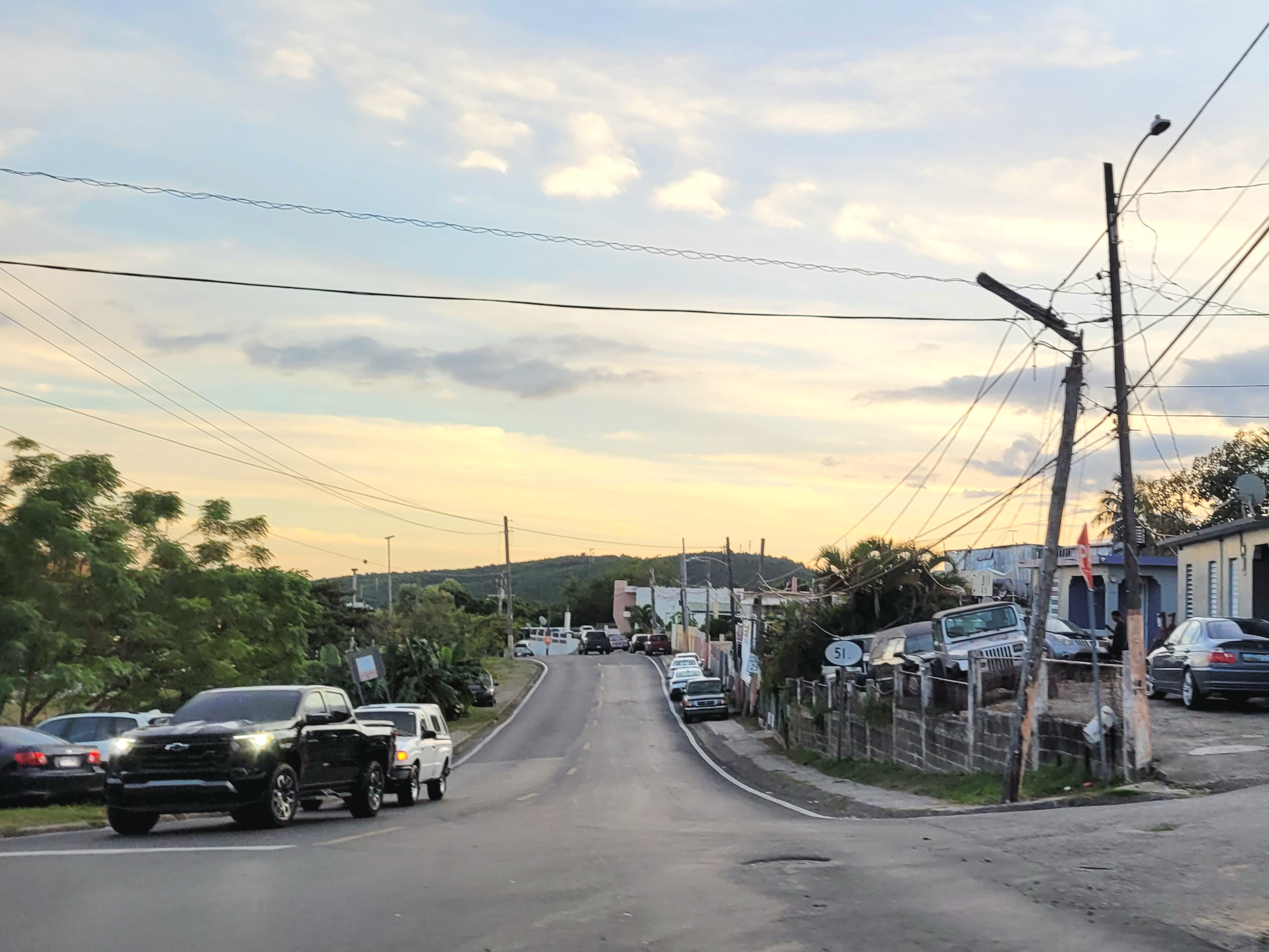
- Puerto Rico Highway 510 in Tijeras

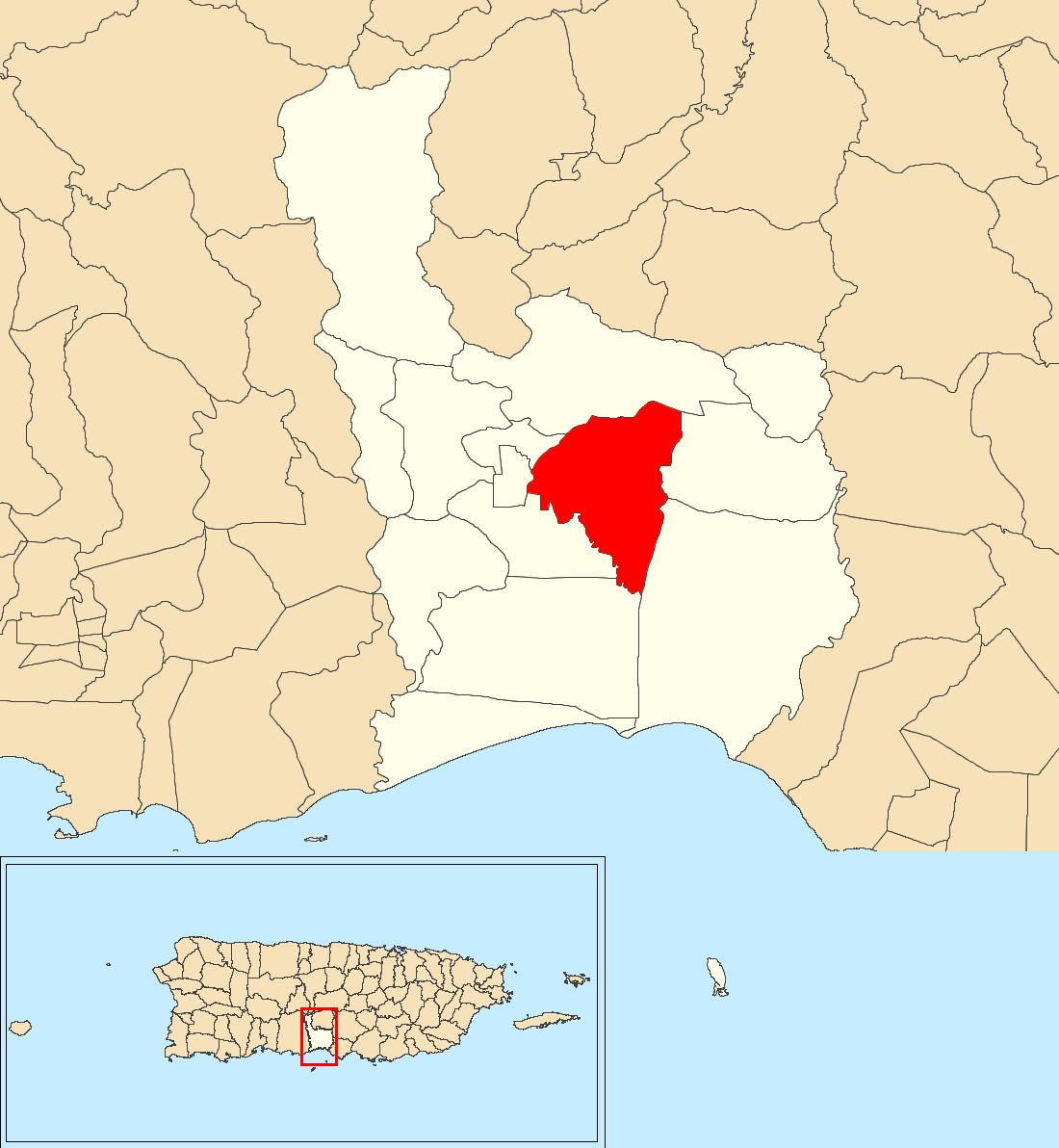
- Location of Tijeras within the municipality of Juana Díaz shown in red

- Location of Puerto Rico
- Coordinates: 18°02′27″N 66°28′52″W
- Commonwealth: Puerto Rico
- Municipality: Juana Díaz

Area
  - Total: 4.46 sq mi (11.6 km^{2})
  - Land: 4.44 sq mi (11.5 km^{2})
  - Water: 0.02 sq mi (0.052 km^{2})
- Elevation: 453 ft (138 m)

Population (2010)
  - Total: 5,670
  - Density: 1,277/sq mi (493/km^{2})
- Source: 2010 Census
- Time zone: UTC−4 (AST)
- Postal code: 00795
- Area code: 787/939

Tijeras is a barrio in the municipality of Juana Díaz, Puerto Rico. Its population in 2010 was 5,670.

== History ==
Tijeras was in Spain's gazetteers until Puerto Rico was ceded by Spain in the aftermath of the Spanish–American War under the terms of the Treaty of Paris of 1898 and became an unincorporated territory of the United States. In 1899, the United States Department of War conducted a census of Puerto Rico finding that the combined population of Tijeras and Emajagual barrios was 1,005.

Historical population
Census	Pop.	Note	%±
1910	789		—
1920	820		3.9%
1930	954		16.3%
1940	1,062		11.3%
1950	2,268		113.6%
1960	2,957		30.4%
1970	0		−100.0%
1980	3,928		—
1990	4,478		14.0%
2000	5,640		25.9%
2010	5,670		0.5%
U.S. Decennial Census; 1900 (N/A) 1910-1930; 1930-1950 1980-2000 2010

== See also ==
- List of communities in Puerto Rico
