= Emajagual =

Barrio in Juana Díaz, Puerto Rico

- Barrio
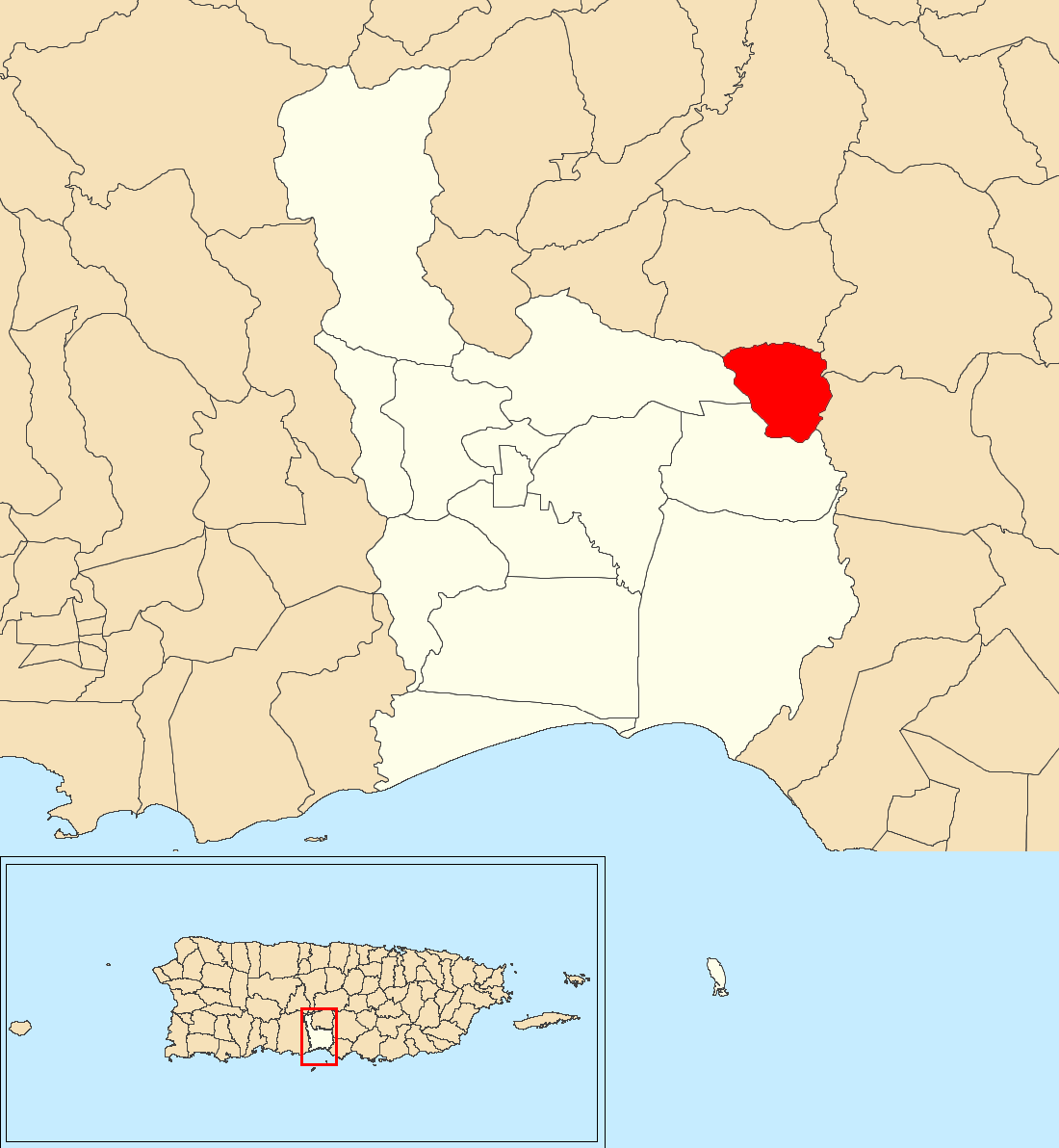
- Location of Emajagual within the municipality of Juana Díaz shown in red

- Location of Puerto Rico
- Coordinates: 18°04′26″N 66°26′23″W
- Commonwealth: Puerto Rico
- Municipality: Juana Díaz

Area
  - Total: 2.00 sq mi (5.2 km^{2})
  - Land: 2.00 sq mi (5.2 km^{2})
  - Water: 0.00 sq mi (0 km^{2})
- Elevation: 745 ft (227 m)

Population (2010)
  - Total: 0
- Source: 2010 Census
- Time zone: UTC−4 (AST)
- Postal code: 00795
- Area code: 787/939

Emajagual is a barrio in the municipality of Juana Díaz, Puerto Rico. Its population in 2010 was 0.

== History ==
Emajagual was in Spain's gazetteers until Puerto Rico was ceded by Spain in the aftermath of the Spanish–American War under the terms of the Treaty of Paris of 1898 and became an unincorporated territory of the United States. In 1899, the United States Department of War conducted a census of Puerto Rico finding that the combined population of Emajagual and Tijeras barrios was 1,005.

Historical population
Census	Pop.	Note	%±
1910	365		—
1920	370		1.4%
1930	315		−14.9%
1940	159		−49.5%
1950	153		−3.8%
1960	48		−68.6%
1970	40		−16.7%
1980	30		−25.0%
1990	8		−73.3%
2000	3		−62.5%
2010	0		−100.0%
U.S. Decennial Census; 1900 (N/A) 1910-1930; 1930-1950 1980-2000 2010

== See also ==
- List of communities in Puerto Rico
