= Sabana Llana, Juana Díaz, Puerto Rico =

Barrio of Puerto Rico

Sabana Llana
- Barrio
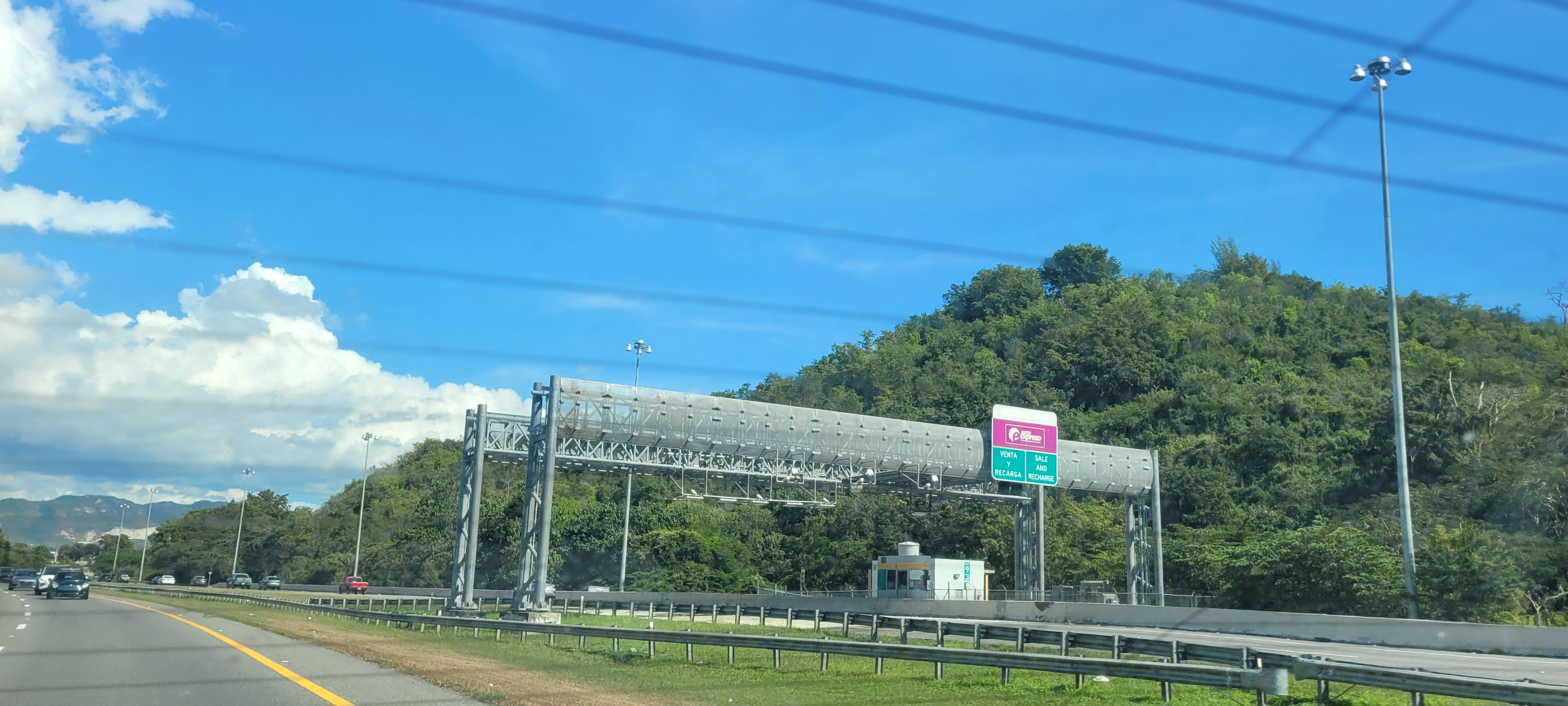
- Puerto Rico Highway 52 between Sabana Llana and Jacaguas

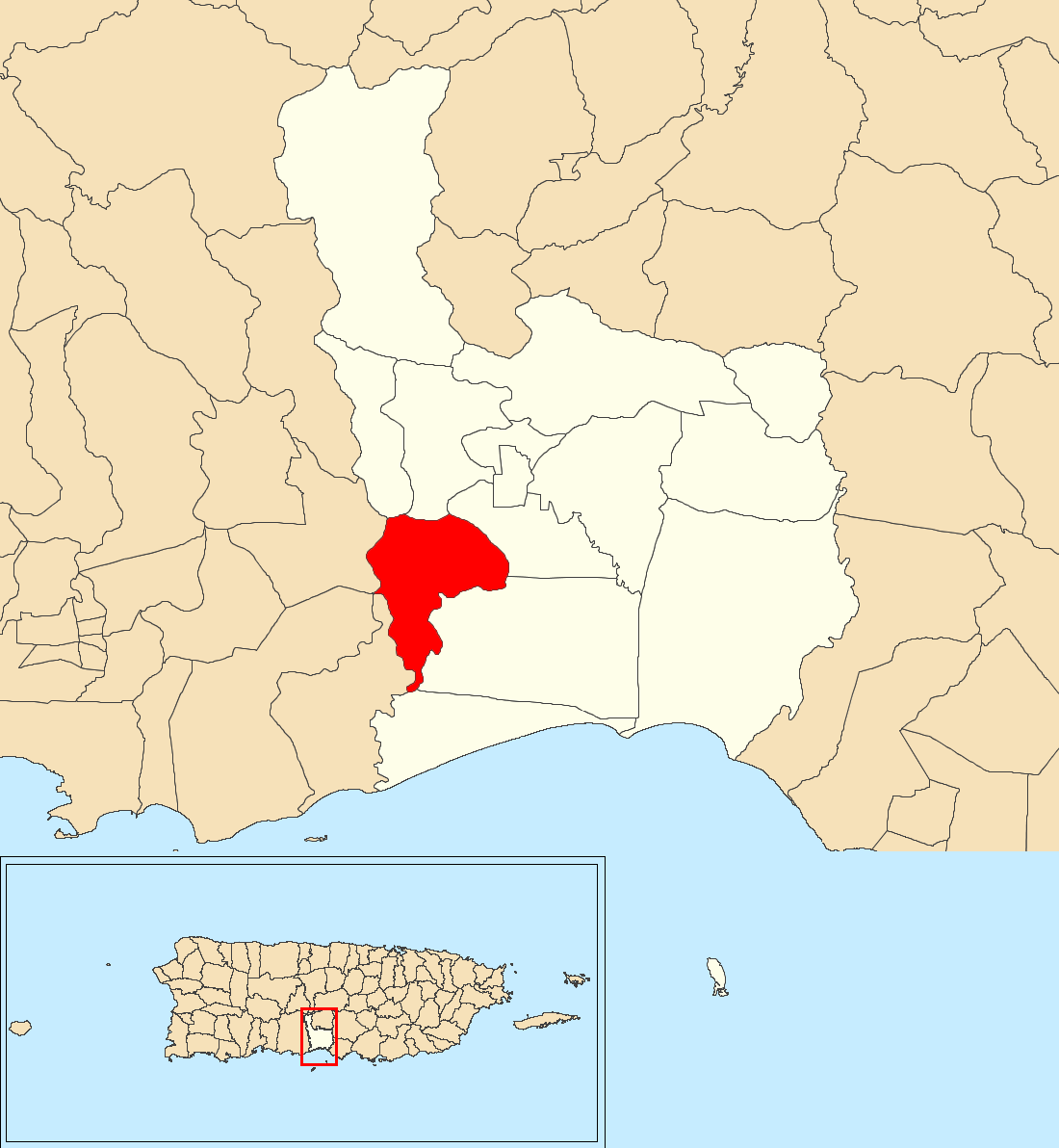
- Location of Sabana Llana within the municipality of Juana Díaz shown in red

- Location of Puerto Rico
- Coordinates: 18°01′40″N 66°31′37″W
- Commonwealth: Puerto Rico
- Municipality: Juana Díaz

Area
  - Total: 3.33 sq mi (8.6 km^{2})
  - Land: 3.31 sq mi (8.6 km^{2})
  - Water: 0.02 sq mi (0.052 km^{2})
- Elevation: 75 ft (23 m)

Population (2010)
  - Total: 8,896
  - Density: 2,687.6/sq mi (1,037.7/km^{2})
- Source: 2010 Census
- Time zone: UTC−4 (AST)
- Postal code: 00795
- Area code: 787/939

Sabana Llana is a barrio in the municipality of Juana Díaz, Puerto Rico. Its population in 2010 was 8,896.

== History ==
Sabana Llana was in Spain's gazetteers until Puerto Rico was ceded by Spain in the aftermath of the Spanish–American War under the terms of the Treaty of Paris of 1898 and became an unincorporated territory of the United States. In 1899, the United States Department of War conducted a census of Puerto Rico finding that the combined population of Sabana Llana and Lomas barrios was 938.

Historical population
Census	Pop.	Note	%±
1910	572		—
1920	648		13.3%
1930	755		16.5%
1940	1,259		66.8%
1950	1,143		−9.2%
1960	1,866		63.3%
1970	2,743		47.0%
1980	6,483		136.3%
1990	6,499		0.2%
2000	7,964		22.5%
2010	8,896		11.7%
U.S. Decennial Census; 1900 (N/A) 1910-1930; 1930-1950 1980-2000 2010

== See also ==
- List of communities in Puerto Rico
