= Río Cañas Arriba, Juana Díaz, Puerto Rico =

Barrio of Puerto Rico

Río Cañas Arriba
- Barrio
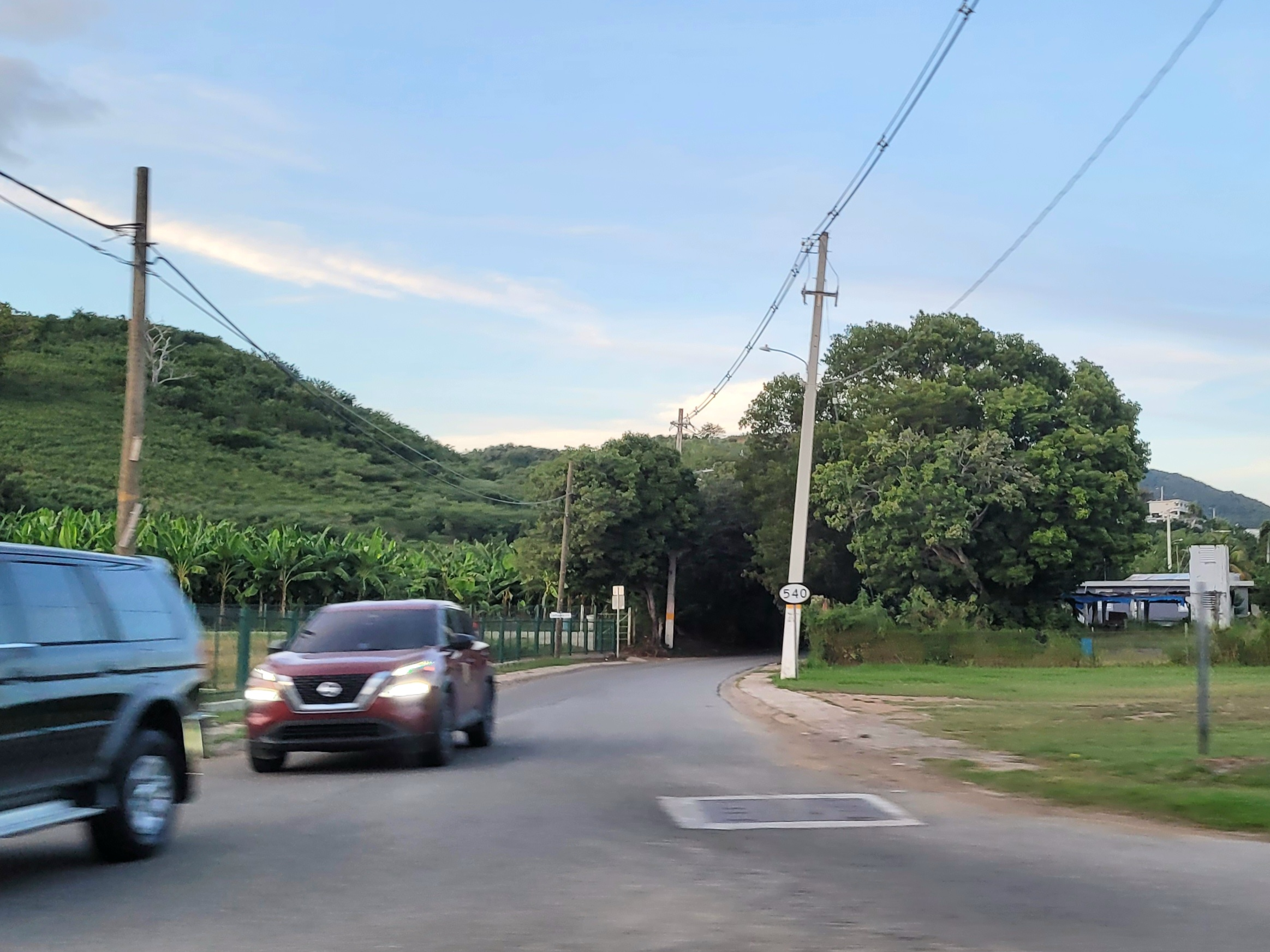
- Puerto Rico Highway 540 in Río Cañas Arriba

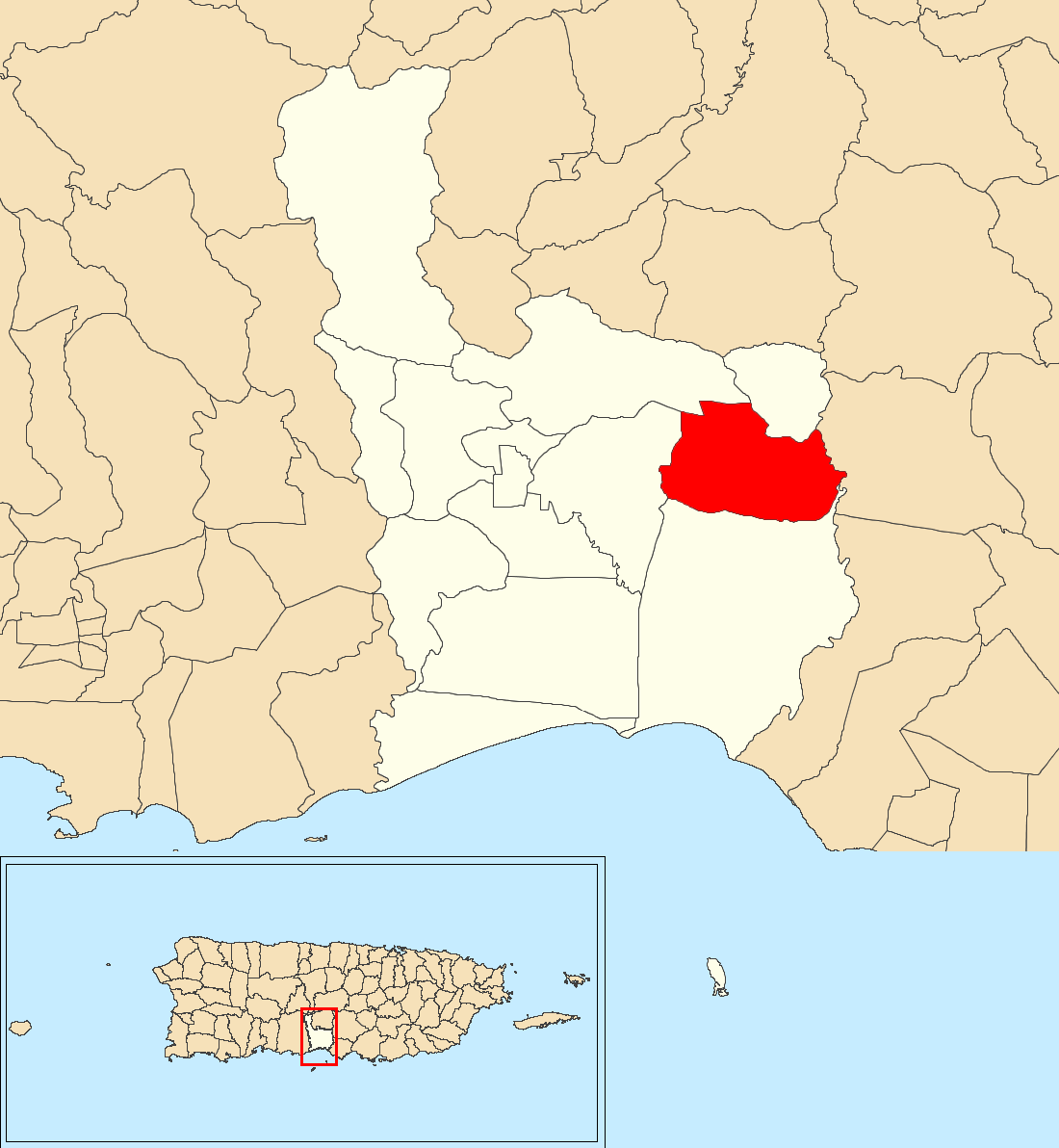
- Location of Río Cañas Arriba within the municipality of Juana Díaz shown in red

- Location of Puerto Rico
- Coordinates: 18°02′49″N 66°26′30″W
- Commonwealth: Puerto Rico
- Municipality: Juana Díaz

Area
  - Total: 4.19 sq mi (10.9 km^{2})
  - Land: 4.18 sq mi (10.8 km^{2})
  - Water: 0.01 sq mi (0.026 km^{2})
- Elevation: 453 ft (138 m)

Population (2010)
  - Total: 2,165
  - Density: 517.9/sq mi (200.0/km^{2})
- Source: 2010 Census
- Time zone: UTC−4 (AST)
- Postal code: 00795
- Area code: 787/939

Río Cañas Arriba is a barrio in the municipality of Juana Díaz, Puerto Rico. Its population in 2010 was 2,165.

== History ==
Río Cañas Arriba was in Spain's gazetteers until Puerto Rico was ceded by Spain in the aftermath of the Spanish–American War under the terms of the Treaty of Paris of 1898 and became an unincorporated territory of the United States. In 1899, the United States Department of War conducted a census of Puerto Rico finding that the population of Río Cañas Arriba barrio was 990.

Historical population
Census	Pop.	Note	%±
1900	990		—
1910	975		−1.5%
1920	1,136		16.5%
1930	909		−20.0%
1940	895		−1.5%
1950	902		0.8%
1960	797		−11.6%
1970	808		1.4%
1980	1,041		28.8%
1990	977		−6.1%
2000	2,332		138.7%
2010	2,165		−7.2%
U.S. Decennial Census; 1899 (shown as 1900) 1910-1930; 1930-1950 1980-2000 2010

== Features ==
Río Cañas Arriba is close enough to the Guayabal reservoir that if the reservoir were to overfill, and the dam's overfill doors automatically opened, residents would have a short time to evacuate. The torrential rains of Hurricane Laura in August 2020 almost caused the reservoir's doors to automatically open and residents were on alert.

== See also ==
- List of communities in Puerto Rico
