= Jacaguas =

Barrio of Juana Díaz, Puerto Rico

- Barrio
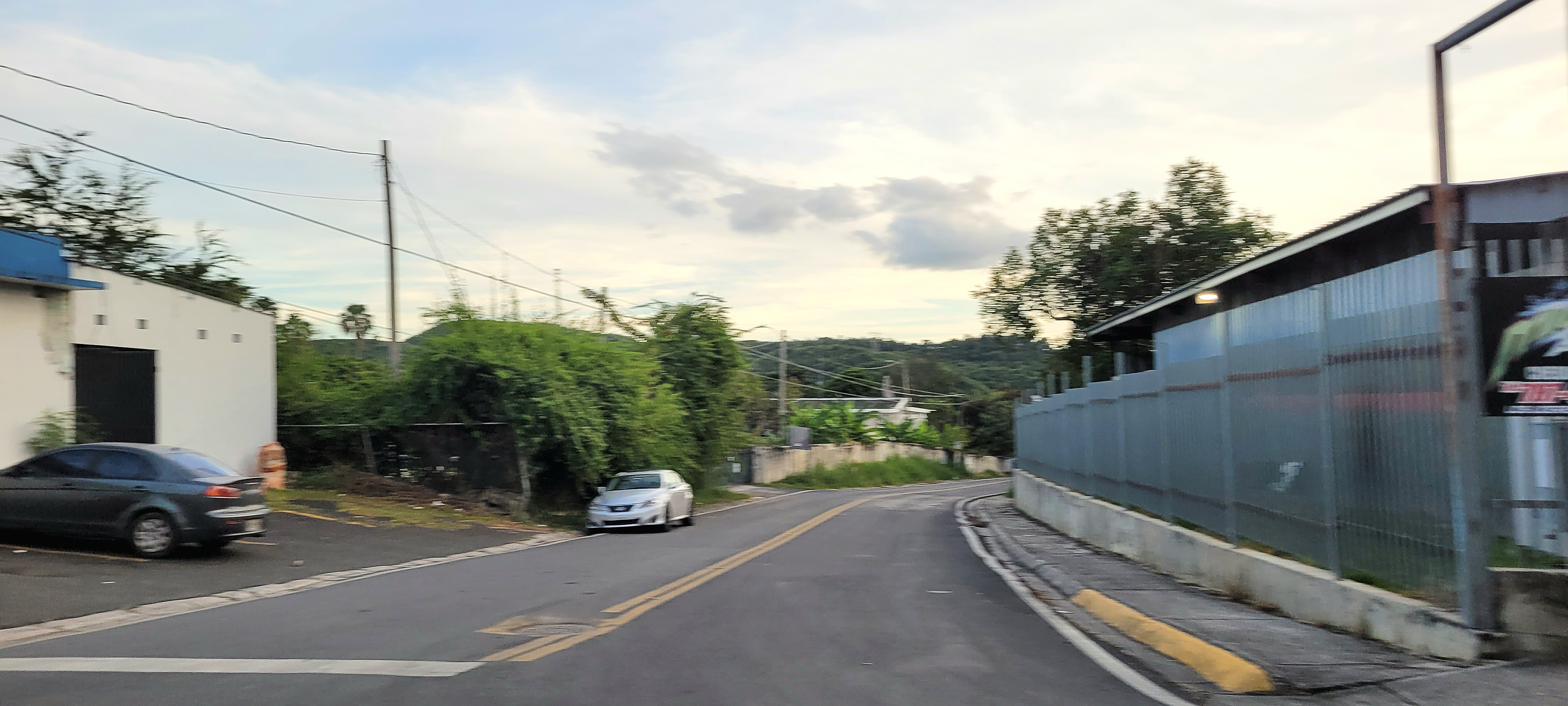
- Puerto Rico Highway 574 in Jacaguas

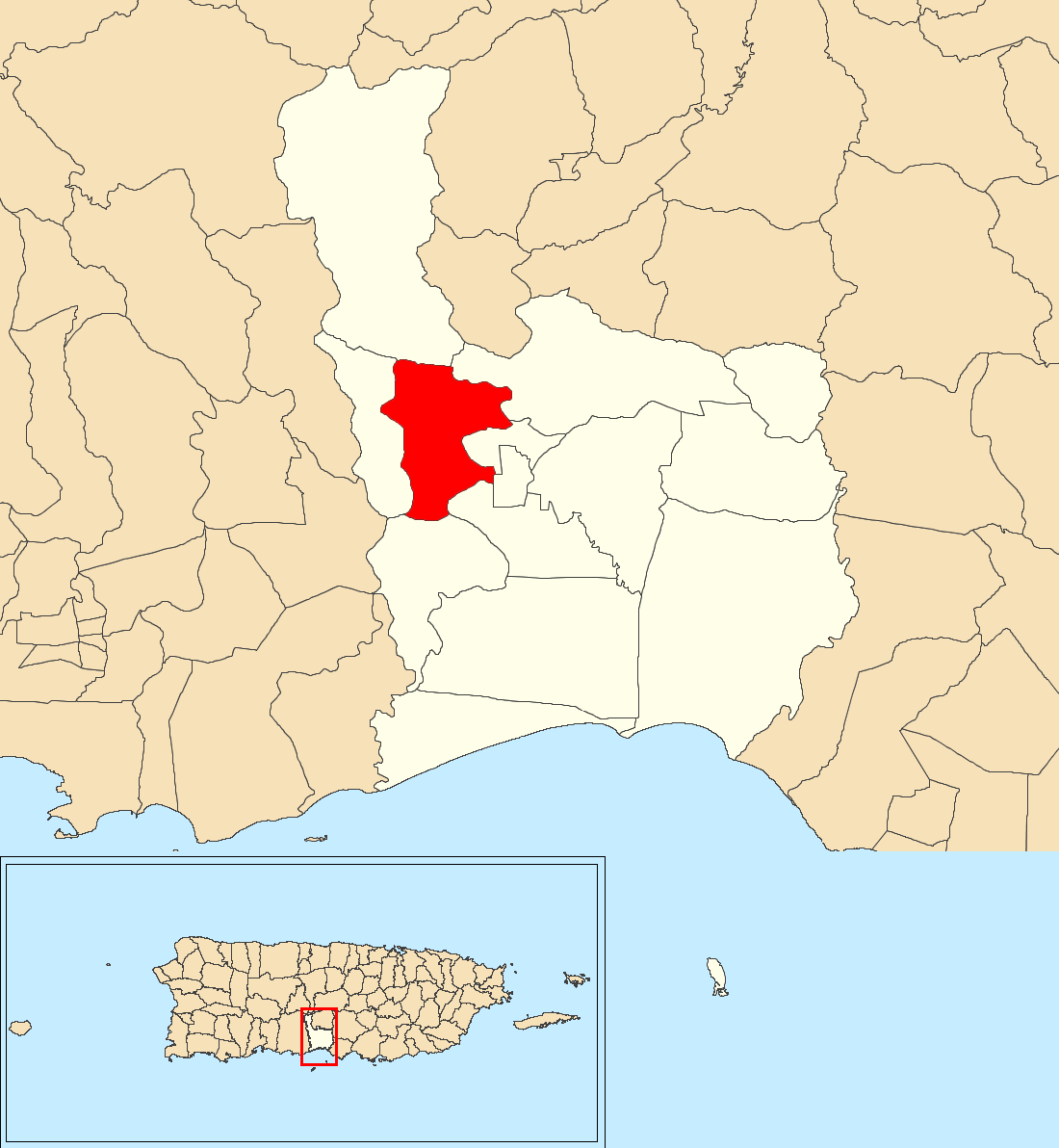
- Location of Jacaguas within the municipality of Juana Díaz shown in red

- Location of Puerto Rico
- Coordinates: 18°03′53″N 66°31′39″W
- Commonwealth: Puerto Rico
- Municipality: Juana Díaz

Area
  - Total: 3.28 sq mi (8.5 km^{2})
  - Land: 3.27 sq mi (8.5 km^{2})
  - Water: 0.01 sq mi (0.026 km^{2})
- Elevation: 266 ft (81 m)

Population (2010)
  - Total: 3,957
  - Density: 1,213.8/sq mi (468.7/km^{2})
- Source: 2010 Census
- Time zone: UTC−4 (AST)
- Postal code: 00795
- Area code: 787/939

Jacaguas is a barrio in the municipality of Juana Díaz, Puerto Rico. Its population in 2010 was 3,957.

== History ==
Jacaguas was in Spain's gazetteers until Puerto Rico was ceded by Spain in the aftermath of the Spanish–American War under the terms of the Treaty of Paris of 1898 and became an unincorporated territory of the United States. In 1899, the United States Department of War conducted a census of Puerto Rico finding that the combined population of Jacaguas and Callabo barrios was 936.

Historical population
Census	Pop.	Note	%±
1910	360		—
1920	440		22.2%
1930	531		20.7%
1940	600		13.0%
1950	1,129		88.2%
1960	1,611		42.7%
1970	0		−100.0%
1980	3,253		—
1990	3,959		21.7%
2000	4,522		14.2%
2010	3,957		−12.5%
U.S. Decennial Census; 1900 (N/A) 1910-1930; 1930-1950 1980-2000 2010

== See also ==
- List of communities in Puerto Rico
