= Juana Díaz, Puerto Rico =

City and municipality in Puerto Rico

Juana Díaz
- Town and Municipality
- Municipio Autónomo de Juana Díaz
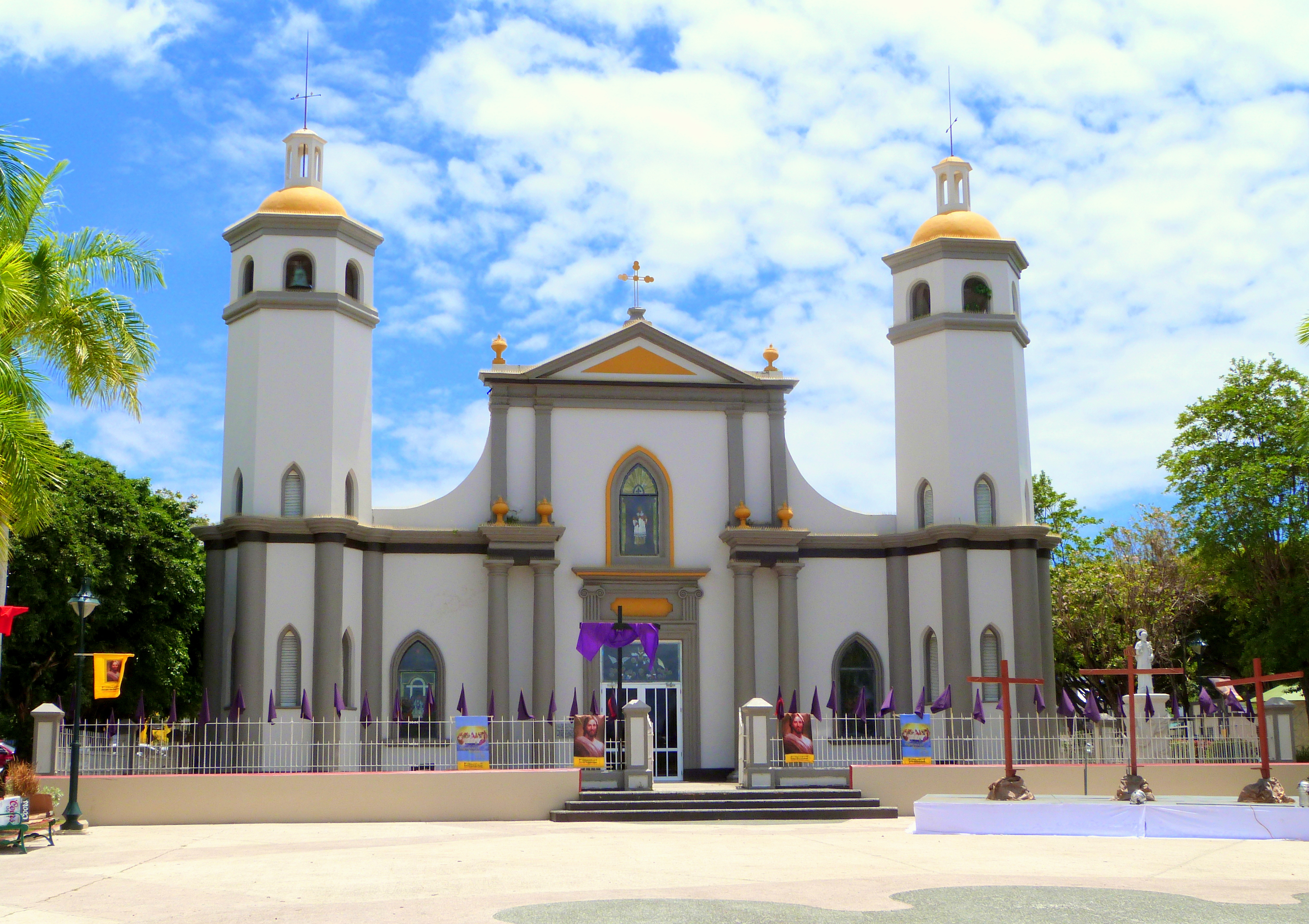
- San Ramon Nonato Church and main town square in Juana Díaz

- Flag Coat of arms
- Nicknames: "La Ciudad del Maví", "La Ciudad del Jacaguas", "El Belén de Puerto Rico"
- Anthem: "Juanadinos, alcemos las voces"
- Map of Puerto Rico highlighting Juana Díaz Municipality
- Coordinates: 18°03′09″N 66°30′24″W
- Sovereign state: United States
- Commonwealth: Puerto Rico
- Settled: 1582
- Founded: April 25, 1798
- Founder: Don Diego Vázquez
- Barrios: 14 barrios: Amuelas; Callabo; Capitanejo; Cintrona; Collores; Emajagual; Guayabal; Jacaguas; Juana Díaz barrio-pueblo; Lomas; Río Cañas Abajo; Río Cañas Arriba; Sabana Llana; Tijeras

Government
  - Mayor: Ramón "Ramoncito" Hernández (PPD)
  - Senatorial District: 5 - Ponce (Half)
  - Senatorial District: 6 - Guayama (Half)
  - Representative District: 25 (Precinct 63) Ponce Senatorial District
  - Representative District: 27 (Precinct 64) Guayama Senatorial District

Area
  - Total: 107.04 sq mi (277.23 km^{2})
  - Land: 60.29 sq mi (156.15 km^{2})
  - Water: 46.75 sq mi (121.08 km^{2})

Population (2020)
  - Total: 46,538
  - Estimate (2025): 45,853 ▼
  - Rank: 17th in Puerto Rico
  - Density: 771.90/sq mi (298.03/km^{2})
- Demonym: Juanadinos
- Time zone: UTC−4 (AST)
- ZIP Code: 00795
- Area code: 787/939

Juana Díaz (Spanish pronunciation: [ˈxwana ˈði.as]) is a town and municipality of Puerto Rico located on the southern coast of the island, south of Jayuya, Ciales, Orocovis and Villalba; east of Ponce; and west of Coamo and Santa Isabel and the Caribbean Sea to the south. Juana Díaz is spread over 13 barrios and Juana Diaz Pueblo (the downtown area and the administrative center of the city). It is part of the Ponce Metropolitan Statistical Area.

Juana Díaz is known as La Ciudad del Maví ("Maví City"). Mabi is a fermented Taíno beverage made out from the bark of the mavi tree Colubrina elliptica.

== History ==
Juana Díaz was founded in 1798 and was known as Ciudad de Jacagua, in honor of the Taíno Cacique Jacaguax. The civil government of this territory was established on April 25, 1798.

Puerto Rico was ceded by Spain in the aftermath of the Spanish–American War under the terms of the Treaty of Paris of 1898 and became a territory of the United States. In August of 1898, Stephen Crane, a war correspondent for Hearst's New York Journal, single-handedly took possession of the town before an American regiment arrived. In 1899, the United States Department of War conducted a census of Puerto Rico finding that the population of Juana Díaz was 27,896.

On September 20, 2017 Hurricane Maria struck the island of Puerto Rico. In Juana Díaz, 2,500 homes lost their roof.

== Geography ==
Juana Díaz is located on the southern coast. Several rivers run through the Juana Díaz territory, among them, Inabón and the Jacaguas Rivers, from which Juana Díaz takes its nickname, Ciudad del Jacaguas. The Guayabal dam between Juana Díaz and Villalba is located in this river. Among its main tributaries are Río Toa Vaca in Villalba, also dammed. Both Guayabal and Toa Vaca lakes are visible in the map. Lake Toa Vaca is also the main source of drinking water for Juana Díaz, Ponce and other municipalities. The highest point in the municipality is located close to the top of Cerro Maravilla, itself the fifth highest mountain in Puerto Rico.

=== Barrios ===
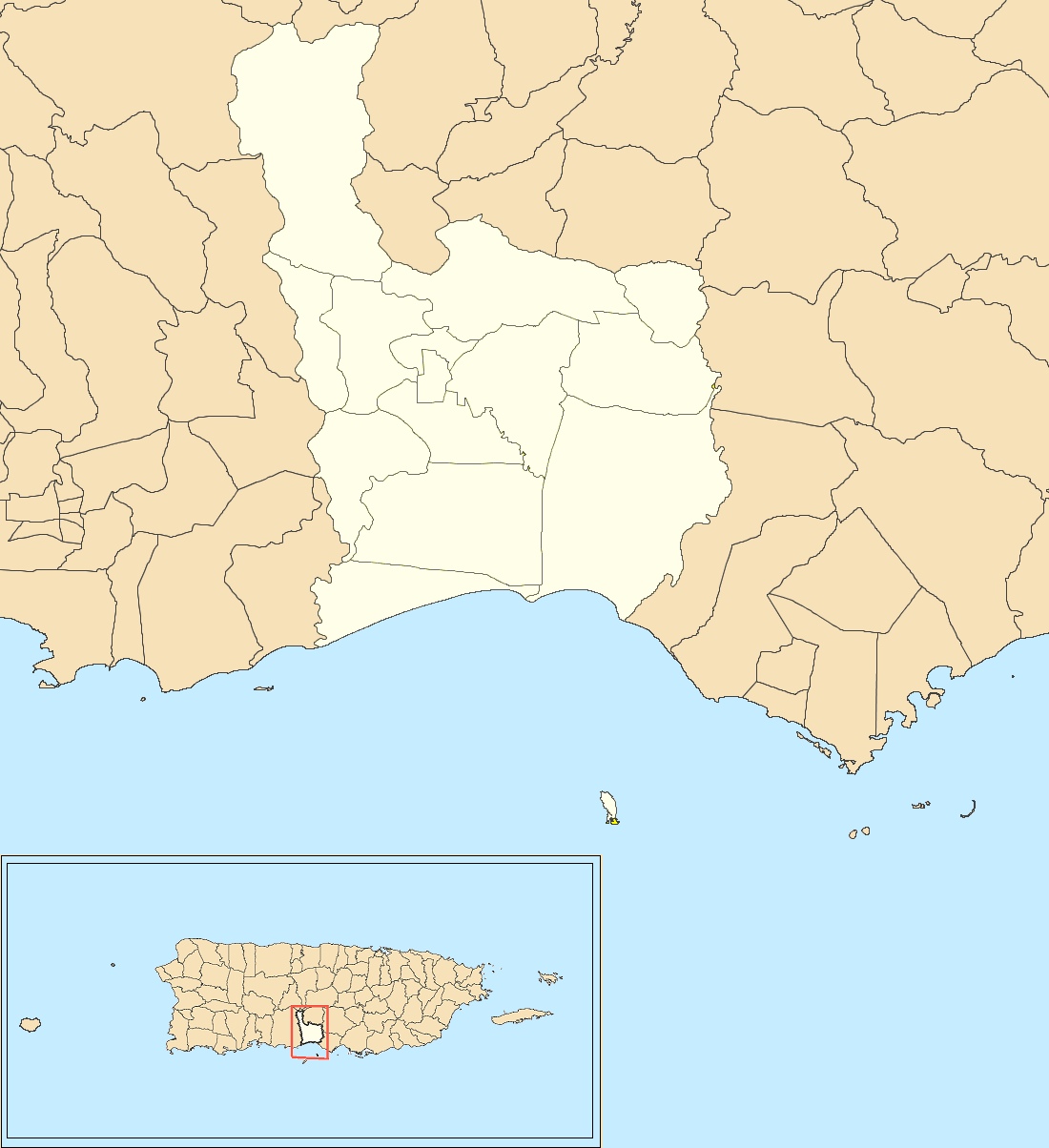
Subdivisions of Juana Díaz.

Like all municipalities of Puerto Rico, Juana Díaz is subdivided into barrios. The municipal buildings, central square and large Catholic church are located in a barrio referred to as "el pueblo".

1. Amuelas
2. Callabo
3. Capitanejo
4. Cintrona
5. Collores
6. Emajagual
7. Guayabal
8. Jacaguas
9. Juana Díaz barrio-pueblo
10. Lomas
11. Río Cañas Abajo
12. Río Cañas Arriba
13. Sabana Llana
14. Tijeras

=== Sectors ===
Barrios (which are, in contemporary times, roughly comparable to minor civil divisions) and subbarrios, are further subdivided into smaller areas called sectores (sectors in English). The types of sectores may vary, from normally sector to urbanización to reparto to barriada to residencial, among others.

=== Special communities ===
Comunidades Especiales de Puerto Rico (Special Communities of Puerto Rico) are marginalized communities whose citizens are experiencing a certain amount of social exclusion. A map shows these communities occur in nearly every municipality of the commonwealth. Of the 742 places that were on the list in 2014, the following barrios, communities, sectors, or neighborhoods were in Juana Díaz: Arús (Pastillito), Callejón de los Perros (Los Buenos), Sector San Carlos in Collores, Sector Baldío in Cuevas, La Atómica, Las Palmas and Manzanilla.

== Demographics ==
Historical population
Census	Pop.	Note	%±
1900	27,896		—
1910	29,157		4.5%
1920	18,529		−36.5%
1930	19,516		5.3%
1940	23,396		19.9%
1950	27,697		18.4%
1960	30,043		8.5%
1970	36,270		20.7%
1980	43,505		19.9%
1990	45,198		3.9%
2000	50,531		11.8%
2010	50,747		0.4%
2020	46,538		−8.3%
2025 (est.)	45,853	▼	−1.5%
U.S. Decennial Census; 1899 (shown as 1900) 1910-1930; 1930-1950 1960-2000 2010

== Tourism ==
To stimulate local tourism, the Puerto Rico Tourism Company launched the Voy Turistiendo ("I'm Touring") campaign, with a passport book and website. The Juana Díaz page lists Casa Museo de los Santos Reyes, Salto de Collores, and Casa de la historia Juanadina José Rafael Gilot, as places of interest.

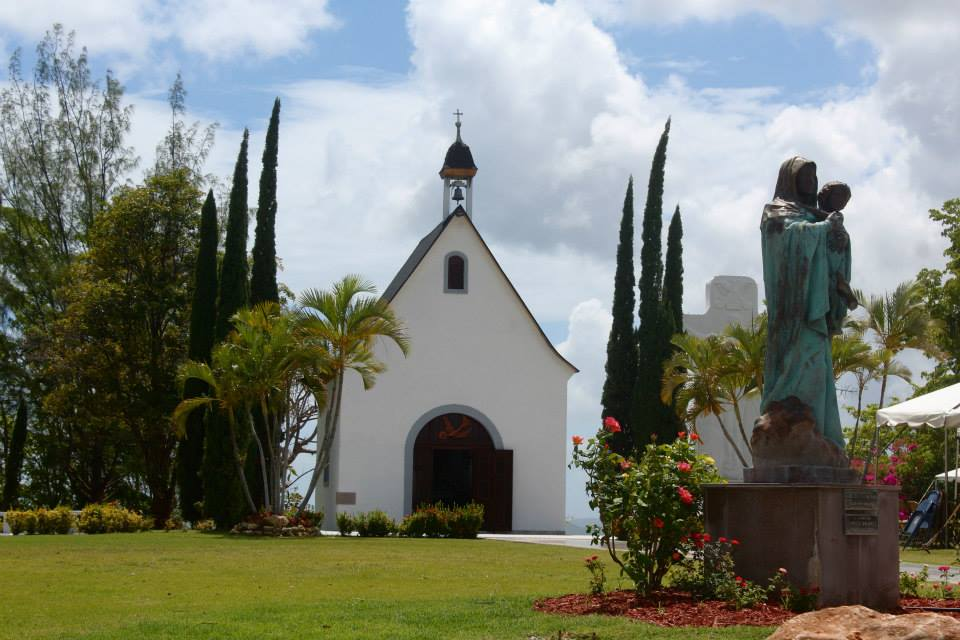
Schoenstatt Shrine in Juana Diaz

=== Landmarks and places of interest ===
According to a news article by Primera Hora, there are 30 beaches in Juana Díaz.

- Iglesia San Ramón Nonato
- Guayabal Reservoir
- Holy Kings Monument
- La Casa Museo de los Santos Reyes (Three Kings Museum)
- Lucero Cave
- Plaza Román Baldorioty de Castro
- Schoenstatt Shrine

== Economy ==
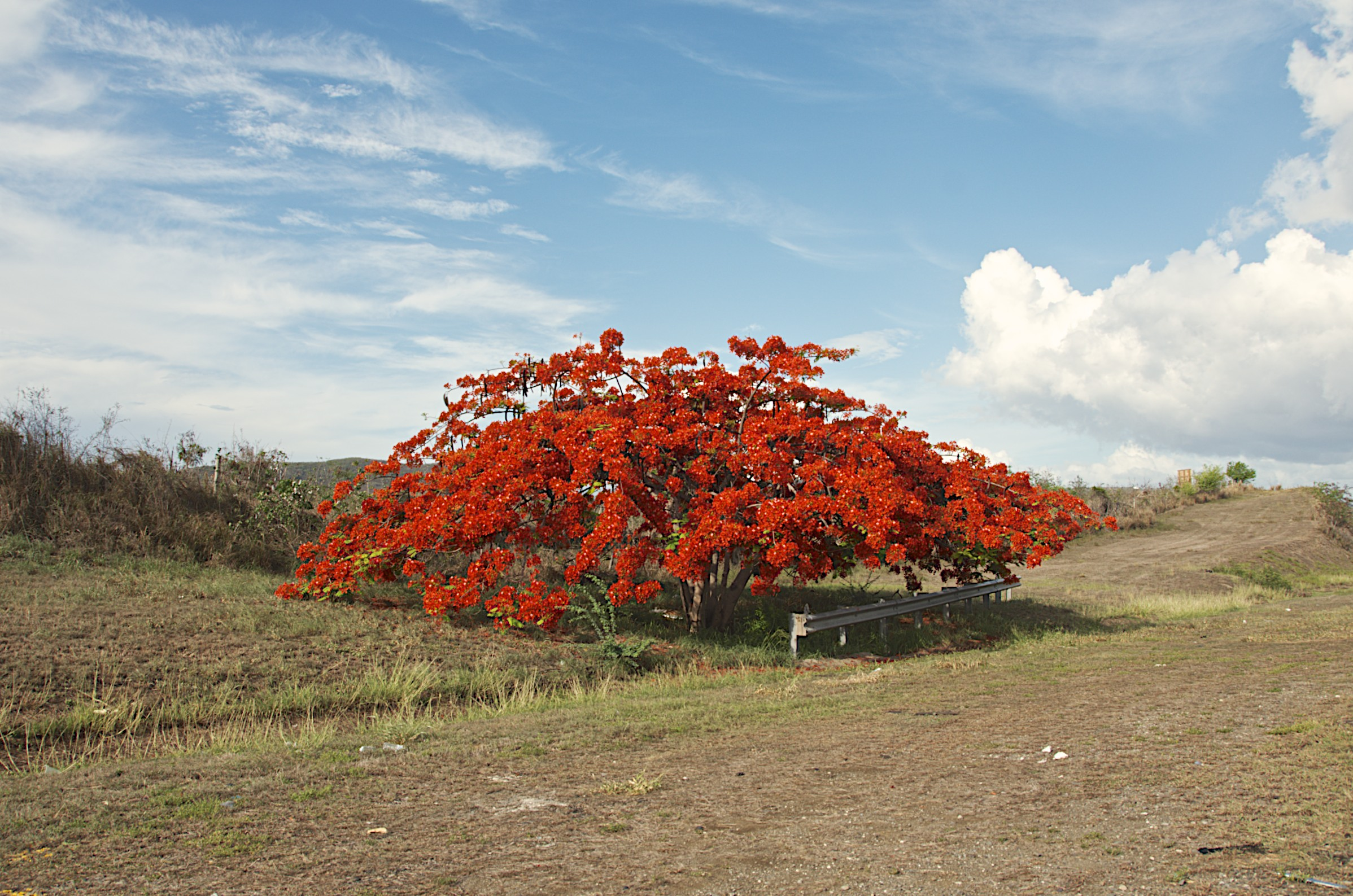
Flamboyan tree in Juana Díaz

=== Agriculture ===
In the past, Juana Díaz was a large producer of sugarcane but with industrial development the sugar cane industry disappeared. Local rums are now produced from raw materials imported from other countries. Juana Díaz produces plantains, bananas, mangoes, and other crops that are consumed in the local markets and also exported to other countries. Cattle and pigs are also raised in local farms.

=== Industry ===
Juana Díaz is a producer of beige marble, one of the finest marbles in the world.

== Culture ==
=== Festivals and events ===
Juana Díaz celebrates its patron saint festival in late August / early September. The Fiestas Patronales de San Ramón Nonato is a religious and cultural celebration that generally features parades, games, artisans, amusement rides, regional food, and live entertainment.

Other festivals and events celebrated in Juana Díaz include:

- The Three Kings Festival in Juana Díaz is the largest in all of Puerto Rico. Three Kings Festival is celebrated on January 6 - religious and cultural event which began in 1884 celebrating the visit of the Three Kings to baby Jesus. The main event is a parade down Comercio Street to the town's plaza where a big altar is set up for the celebration of the Holy Eucharist. The Eucharist begins with an act of the Prophets announcing the coming of the Messiah. The prophesies are followed by the sighting of three kings by the shepherds. The holy mass follows and at the end the Three Kings find and adore baby Jesus. Some people come to the festival dressed up as shepherds.
- Festival del Mabí (Mauby Festival) - March
- Bull Frog Festival - April
- Good Friday - Juana Díaz celebrates many activities during Holy Week each year. The most notable is the Good Friday procession that transits through many of the urban communities with representations of the Stations of the Cross. Thousands of juanadinos and people from other towns visit Juana Díaz on Good Friday.
- Llorensiana Week - May
- Puerto Rican Festivities - December

== Government ==
Like all municipalities in Puerto Rico, Juana Díaz is administered by a mayor. The current mayor is Ramón Hernández Torres, from the Popular Democratic Party (PPD). Hernández was first elected at the 2000 general election.

Part of the city belongs to the Puerto Rico Senatorial district V, which is represented by two senators. In 2024, Marially González Huertas from the Popular Democratic Party and Jamie Barlucea, from the New Progressive Party, were elected as district senators. The other part of the city belongs to the Puerto Rico Senatorial district VI, which has been represented by Rafael Santos Ortiz and Wilmer Reyes Berríos of the New Progressive Party since 2024.

== Symbols ==
The municipio has an official flag and coat of arms.

=== Flag ===
The flag of Juana Díaz is rectangular in shape, formed by two triangles whose hypotenuse extends from the upper left corner to the lower right corner. The upper triangle is white, the symbol of silver and the lower triangle is yellow or gold. At its center is the coat of arms of Juana Díaz in its natural colors.

=== Coat of arms ===
The coat of arms features The Nazarene Cross. It is in the center of the coat of arms. It stands out subtly between furrows and space, symbolizing the union of two races by means of the inalienable bond of the Christian faith. The cross also symbolizes the western Christian culture.

The woman represents - Mrs. Juana Díaz, the towns namesake - with her hands the woman strews thirteen grains of corn into thirteen furrows, symbolizing the seeds that germinated and were the base for the foundation and growth of our town. The woman dresses as those of her time.

The sun symbolizes a new horizon, hope in the formation of a town. The sun within the coat of arms has thirteen rays, each represents one of the barrios of Juana Díaz.

Thirteen knolls stand out in the coat of arms symbolizing each of the thirteen barrios or barrios of Juana Díaz. The mountains also symbolize that Juana Díaz has been one of the richest mineral towns in Puerto Rico.

The Indians represents the natives who settled the village before the arrival of the white man. The native carries on his back thirteen sheathed arrows and a bow, and an arrow on his head. The bow and arrow represent the only effective means of defense useful for survival.

The shackle and the whip represent Juana Díaz as the martyr of 1887. It was in Juana Díaz where liberal politicians and dedicated patriots were martyred because they fought against the Spanish General Romualdo Palacios. "El Componte", a military tribunal, was used to quiet the rebel voices.

The harp represents the music, the quill pen dipped in the ink well represents the verse, the poetry. Juana Díaz has generously given distinguished poets to Puerto Rican literature.

Ciudad del Jacaguas is the name by which Juana Díaz was known in the past. Many people knew Juana Díaz as the city of Jacaguas, but Luis Lloréns Torres dubbed it "La Versalles de Ponce" (Ponce's Versailles).

Four Castles Represent that Juana Díaz reached the stature of city. Cities have five castles in their coat of arms, villages have four and smaller towns have three.

== Transportation ==
Among the most important roads in Juana Díaz are the Luis A. Ferré Expressway (PR-52) which connects Juana Díaz to Ponce and the airport in just minutes and San Juan in a little more than one hour. Other important roads include road PR-14 which runs through downtown Juana Díaz on its route between Ponce and Cayey, road PR-149 from Juana Díaz to Manatí running through Villalba and the "Cordillera Central" and road PR-1 which goes from Ponce to San Juan through the community of Pastillo in the south coast of Juana Díaz.

There are 51 bridges in Juana Díaz.

== Notable people ==
Natives of the Juana Diaz are referred to as "Juanadinos" within Puerto Rico. Among the most notable Juanadinos are:

- Tito Gomez- Salsa singer, known for his work with Ray Barretto, La Sonora Ponceña and Grupo Niche
- Luis Lloréns Torres- Famous Puerto Rican poet and essayist
- Guillermo Jose Torres- Puerto Rican reporter and news anchorman
- Héctor Tricoche- Salsa singer known for his work as the lead singer for the Tommy Olivencia Orchestra
- Dalex - Reggaeton Singer
- José “Palillo” Santiago- former pitcher of the Kansas City Athletics and Boston Red Sox. He was the starting pitcher of Game 1 of the 1967 World Series, in which he also hit a home run off Bob Gibson

== Gallery ==
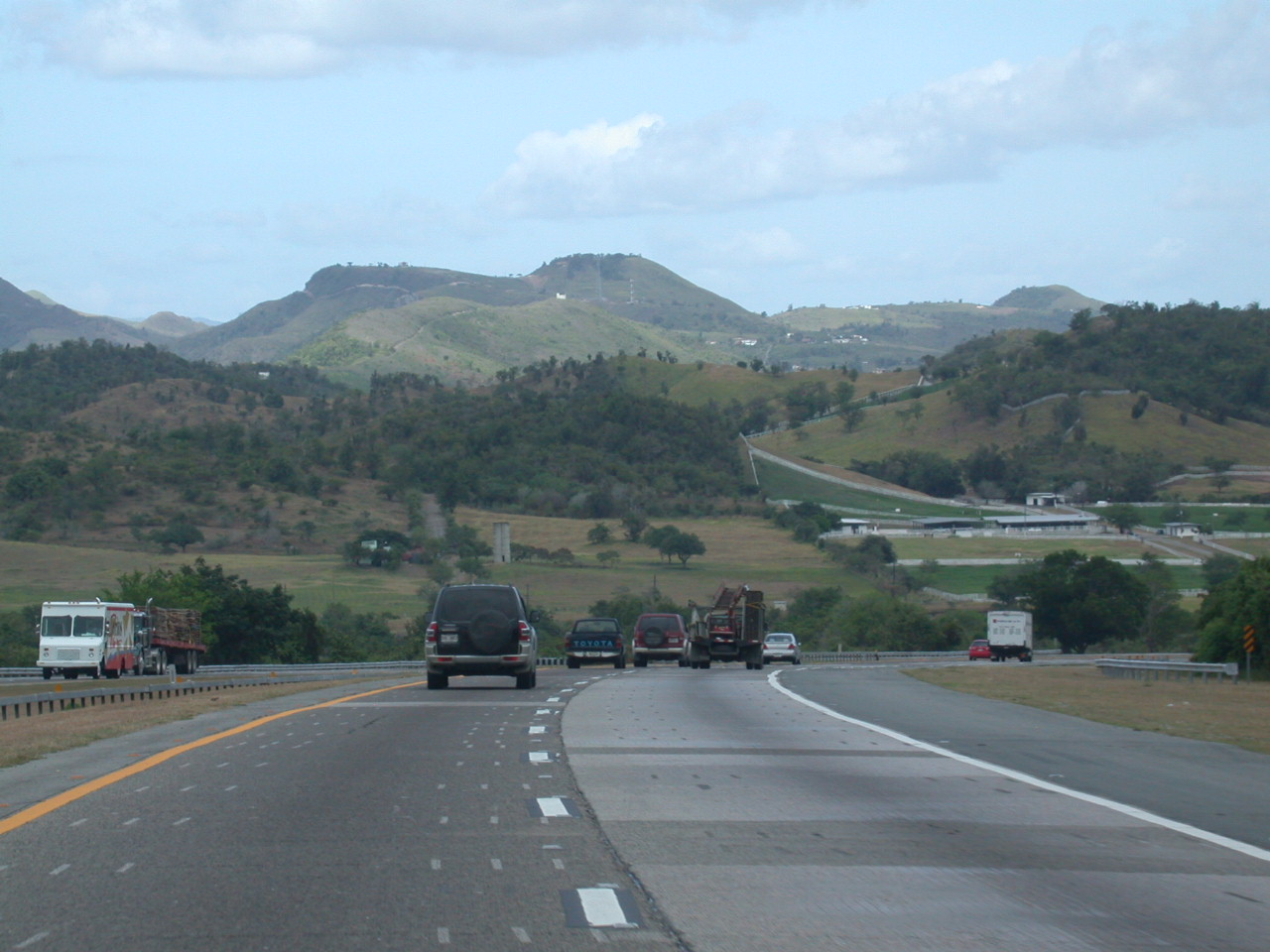
Driving from Juana Díaz to Santa Isabel on PR-52

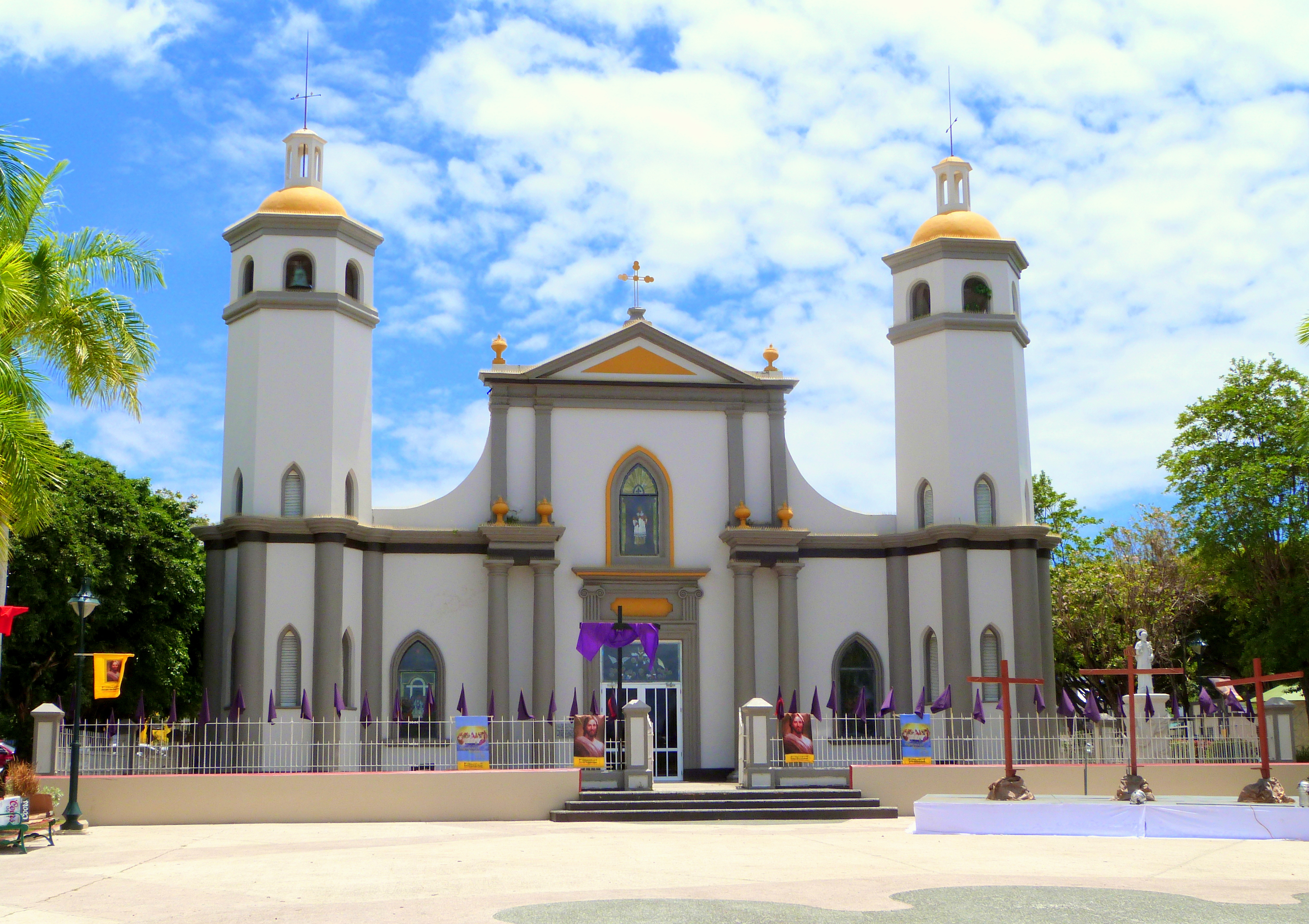
Iglesia de San Juan Bautista y San Ramon Nonato in barrio-pueblo

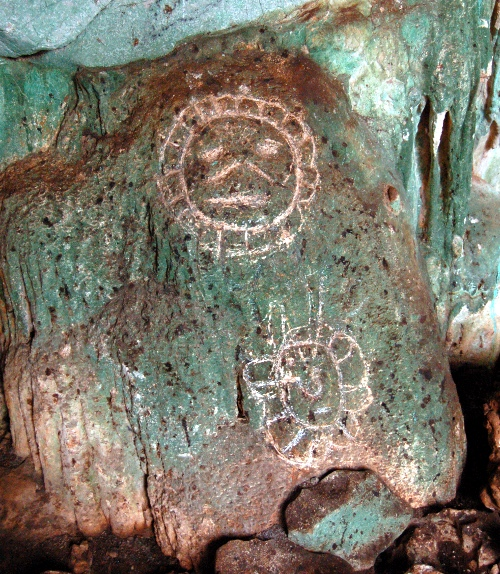
Carvings on rock in Cueva Lucero

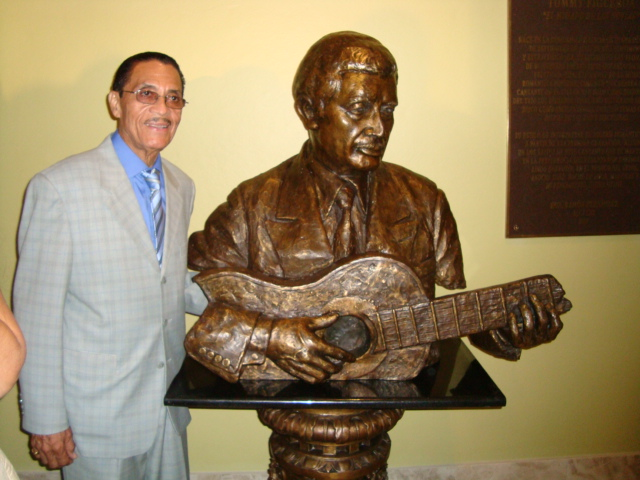
Puerto Rican singer Tommy Figueroa posing with his bust in the Center for Fine Arts in Juana Díaz

View of the town square

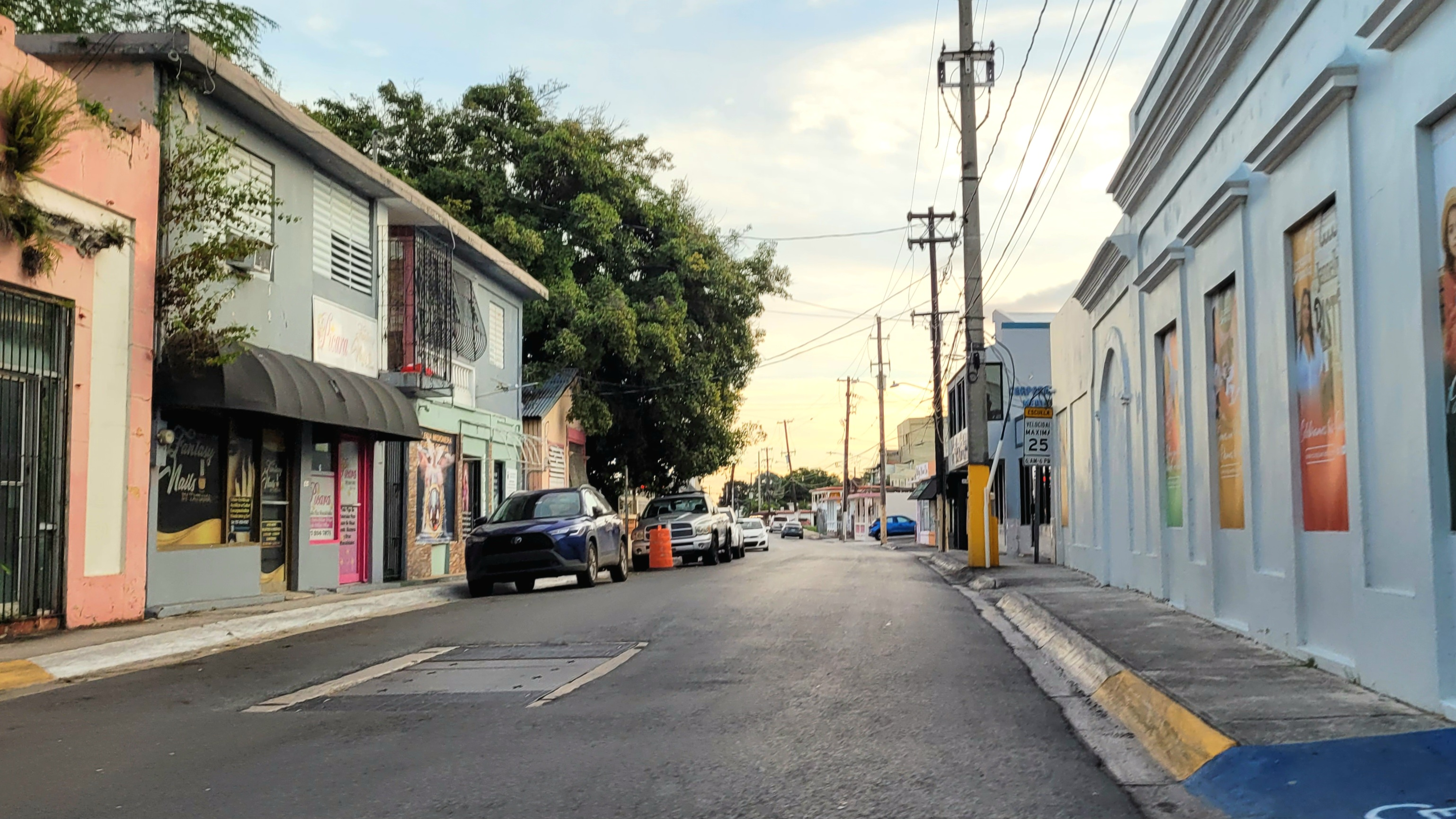
Luis Muñoz Rivera St. looking south

== See also ==
- List of Puerto Ricans
- History of Puerto Rico
- Did you know-Puerto Rico?
- Municipalities of Puerto Rico
