= Puerto Rico Highway 138 =

Highway in Puerto Rico

Highway 138
- Ruta 138
- Avenida Luis Muñoz Marín

Route information
- Maintained by Puerto Rico DTPW
- Length: 2.6 km (1.6 mi)

Major junctions
- South end: PR-14 / PR-153 San Ildefonso
- PR-150 in San Ildefonso
- North end: PR-155 in Pasto

Location
- Country: United States
- Territory: Puerto Rico
- Municipalities: Coamo

Highway system
- Roads in Puerto Rico; List
← PR-137	→ PR-139

Puerto Rico Highway 138 (PR-138) is a north–south bypass located west of downtown Coamo, Puerto Rico. This road extends from PR-155 to the junction of PR-14 with PR-153 and is known as Avenida Luis Muñoz Marín.

PR-153 north approaching PR-14 and PR-138 intersection in San Ildefonso

== Major intersections ==
The entire route is located in Coamo.

Location	km	mi	Destinations	Notes
San Ildefonso	0.0	0.0	PR-153 south – Santa Isabel	Continuation beyond PR-14
San Ildefonso	0.0	0.0	PR-14 (Bulevar Piel Canela) – Coamo, Juana Díaz	Southern terminus of PR-138 and northern terminus of PR-153; roundabout
Coamo barrio-pueblo	1.2	0.75	PR-Calle B / PR-Calle Roberto Rivera – Coamo	
San Ildefonso	1.6– 1.7	0.99– 1.1	PR-150 (Avenida Maratón San Blas) – Coamo, Villalba	
Pasto	2.6	1.6	PR-155 (Carretera Adolfo "Junior" González Rivas, "Hommy") – Coamo, Orocovis	Northern terminus of PR-138
1.000 mi = 1.609 km; 1.000 km = 0.621 mi

== See also ==
- Luis Muñoz Marín
