= Puerto Rico Highway 14 =

Highway in Puerto Rico

Highway 14
- Ruta 14

Route information
- Maintained by Puerto Rico DTPW
- Length: 73.1 km (45.4 mi)
- Existed: 1886 (as the old Carretera Central)–present

Major junctions
- West end: PR-123 / PR-123P in Primero–Cuarto
- PR-14P / PR-14R in Quinto–Sexto; PR-12 in Machuelo Abajo; PR-10 / PR-139 in Machuelo Abajo–Machuelo Arriba; PR-506 in Coto Laurel; PR-149 in Juana Díaz barrio-pueblo–Lomas; PR-138 / PR-153 in San Ildefonso; PR-238 in Palmarejo; PR-162 in Pasto–Llanos–Asomante; PR-173 in Robles–Plata; PR-15 in Cayey barrio-pueblo
- East end: PR-1 in Cayey barrio-pueblo–Monte Llano

Location
- Country: United States
- Territory: Puerto Rico
- Municipalities: Ponce, Juana Díaz, Coamo, Aibonito, Cayey

Highway system
- Roads in Puerto Rico; List
← PR-12	→ PR-15
← PR-3R	PR-14R	→ PR-25R

Puerto Rico Highway 14 (PR-14) is a main highway connecting Ponce to Cayey, Puerto Rico. The road runs the same course as the historic Carretera Central. The Ponce-to-Coamo section of PR-14 was built under the direction of Spanish engineer Raimundo Camprubí Escudero (b. Pamplona 15 March 1846 – d. Madrid 1924).

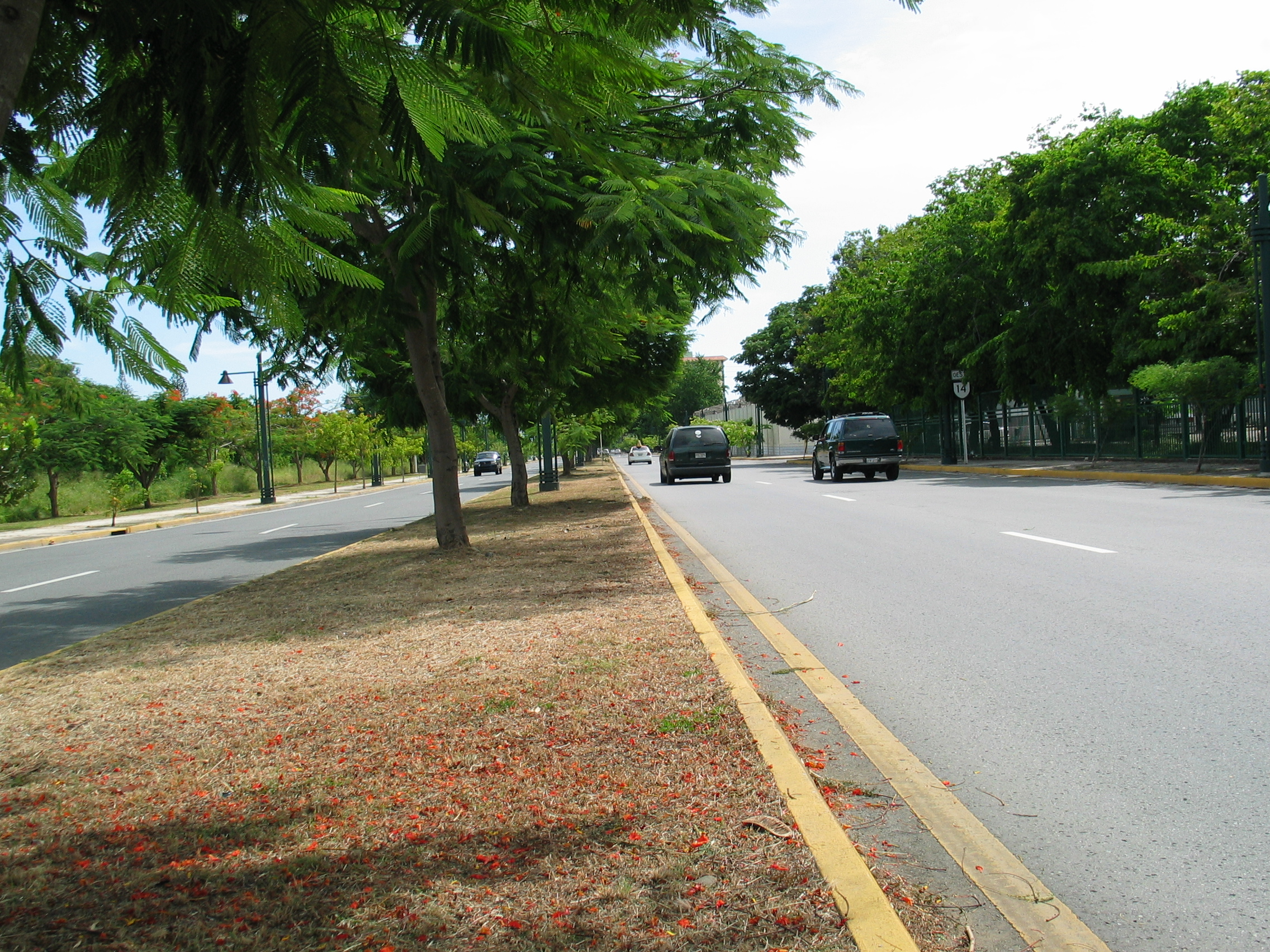
Avenida Tito Castro (PR-14), Barrio Machuelo Abajo, Ponce, looking west (PR-14, near km 4.4)

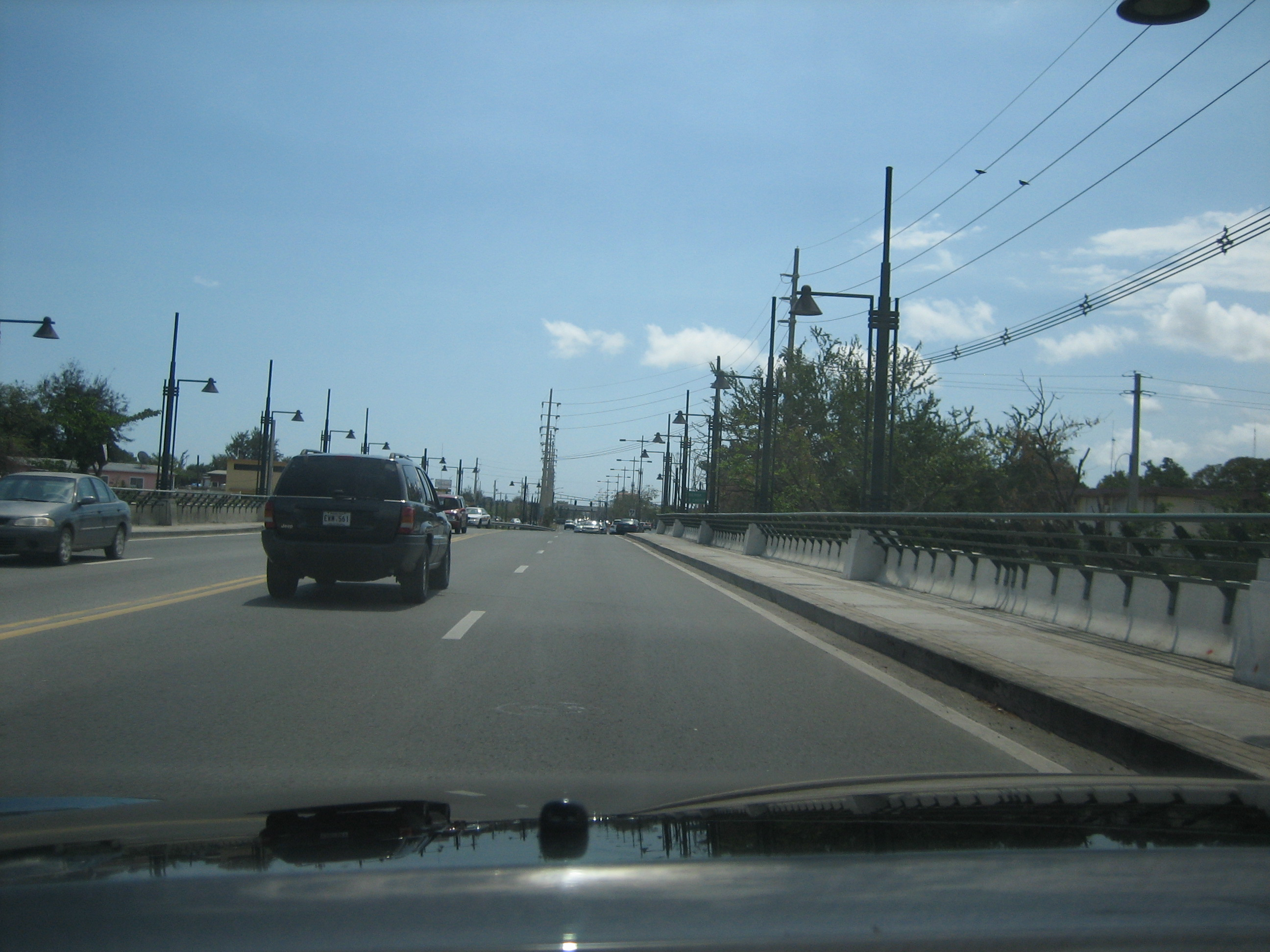
PR-14 westbound at bridge over Río Bucaná on Avenida Tito Castro in Ponce approaching PR-10 (PR-14, near km 5.2)

== Route description ==
Except in the city of Ponce where (with the exception of the Ponce Historic Zone) the road is a 4-lane road known as Avenida Tito Castro, the rest of PR-14 is a two-lane country road as it makes its way through the four towns it runs through, Juana Díaz, Coamo, Aibonito and Cayey. PR-14 is one of the roads that lead into the Ponce Historic Zone.

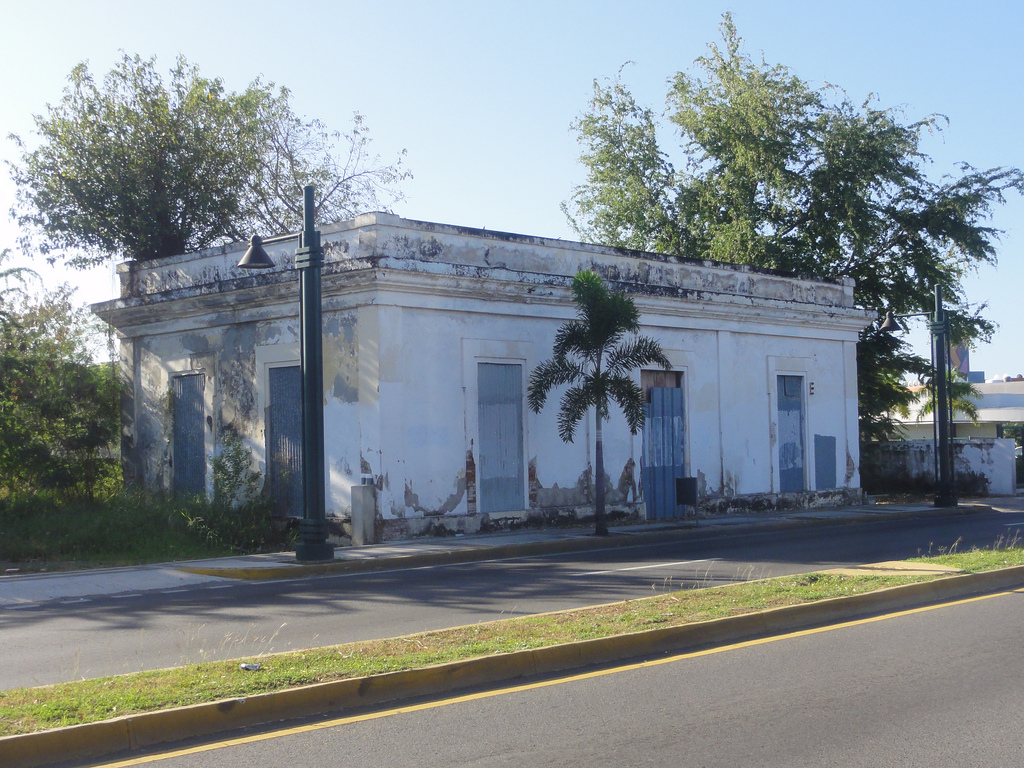
A former Casilla de Caminero on PR-14 (now Avenida Tito Castro) in Ponce (PR-14, near km 3.1)

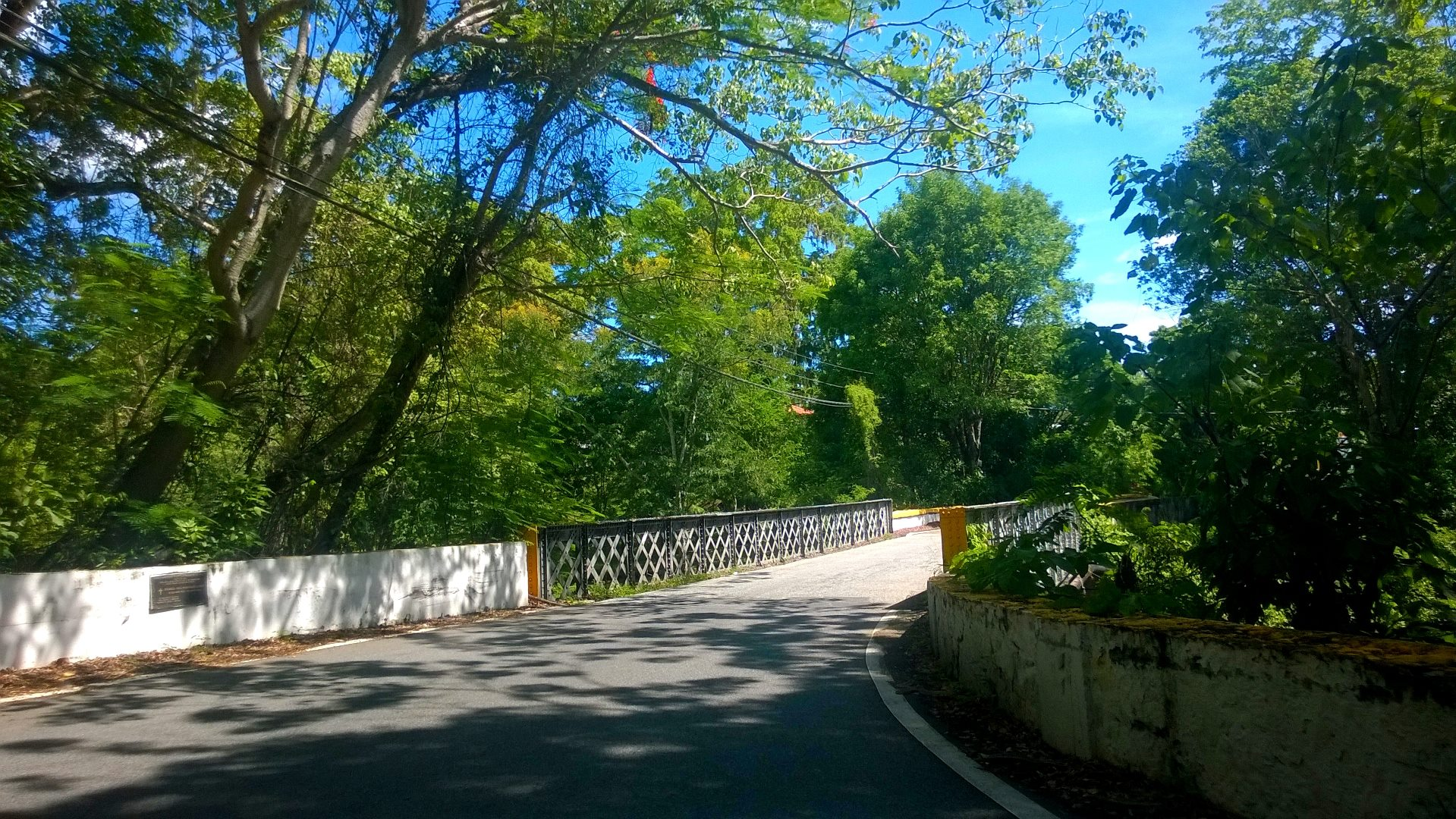
Puente de las Calabazas in Coamo (PR-14, near km 38.8)

Detailed map of PR-14 in the municipality of Ponce

== Major intersections ==
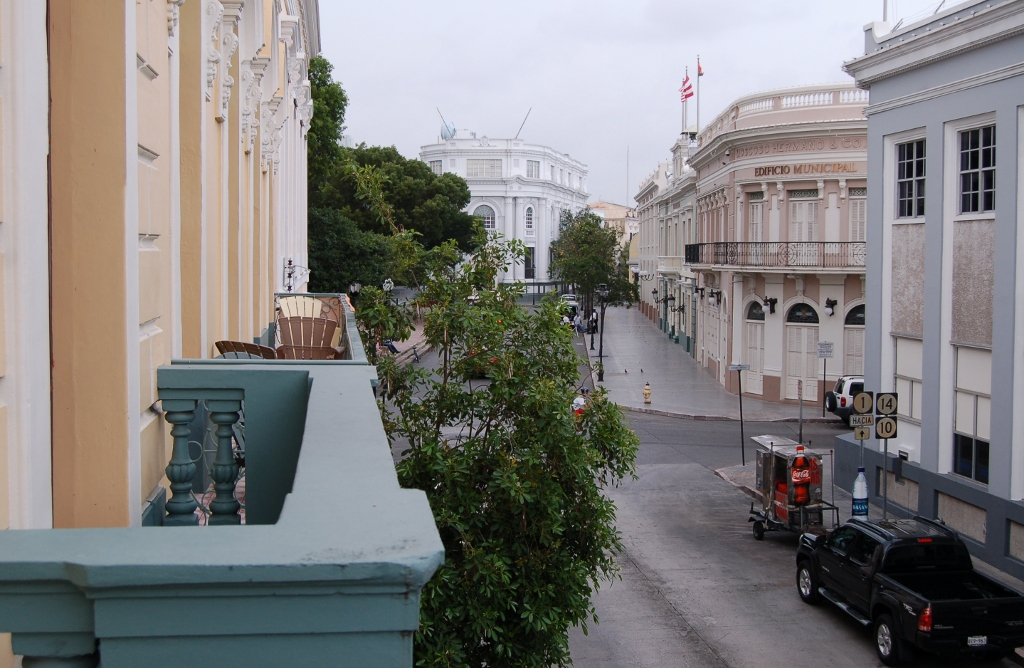
PR-14, PR-10, and PR-1 signs in downtown Ponce (at Calle Villa and Calle Concordia, near PR-14, km 0.2), looking east

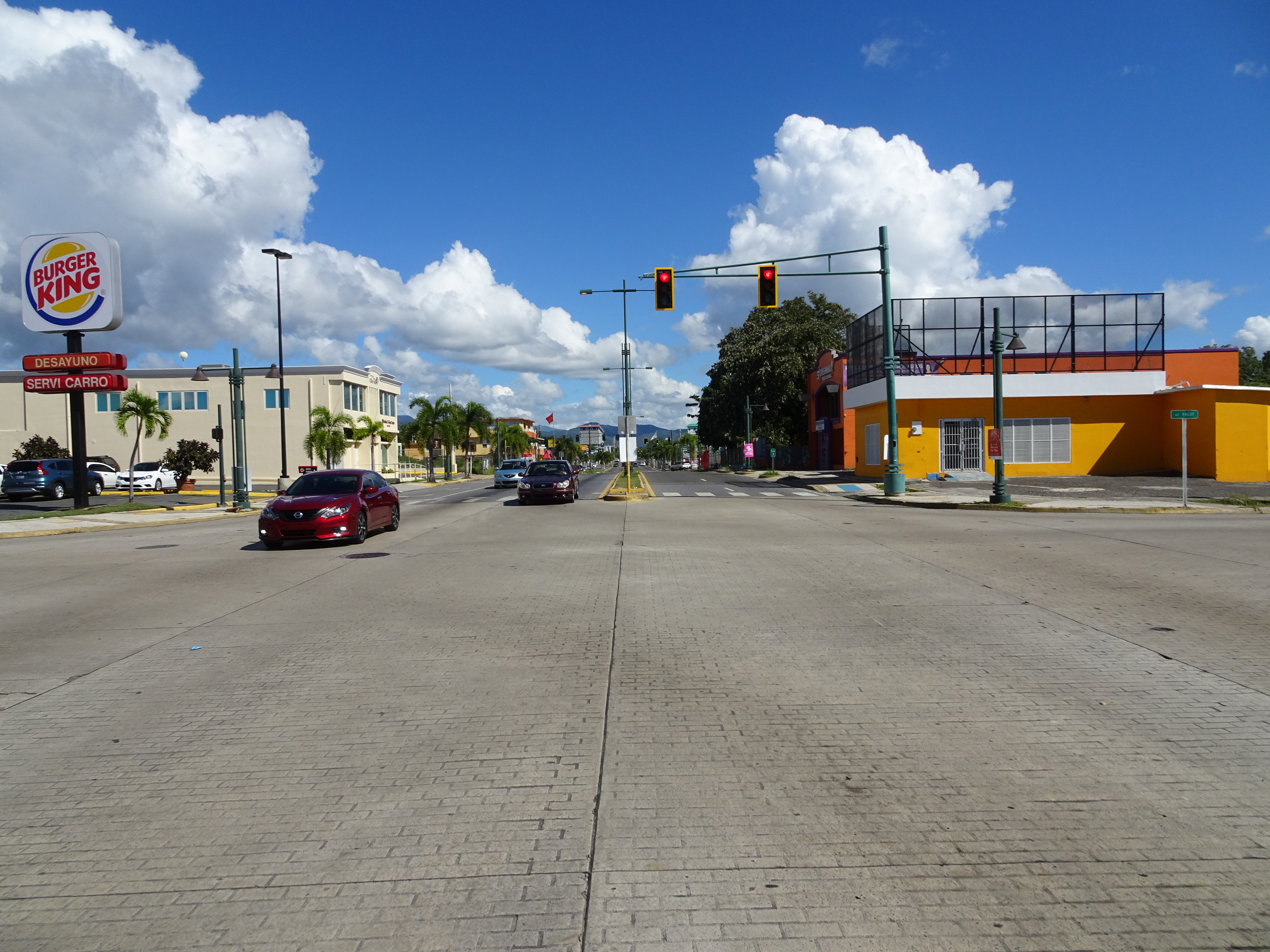
PR-14 eastbound (Avenida Tito Castro) intersection with Avenida Fagot, Ponce (PR-14, km 3.0)

Municipality	Location	km	mi	Destinations	Notes
Ponce	Primero–Cuarto line	0.0	0.0	PR-123	Western terminus of PR-14 and southern terminus of PR-123P; the Carretera Central continues toward Playa; PR-123P access is via Calle Aurora
Ponce	Cuarto–Tercero line	0.5– 0.6	0.31– 0.37	Calle Francisco Parra Duperón (Note: Calle Francisco Parra Duperón is also known as Calle Comercio.) (PR-133 east)	One-way street; unsigned
Ponce	Tercero	0.7	0.43	PR-1P north	One-way street
Ponce	Tercero–Quinto line	0.8	0.50	Calle Isabel (PR-1 west)	One-way street; unsigned
Ponce	Quinto–Sexto line	1.2	0.75	PR-14R	One-way streets; northern terminus of PR-14R and western terminus of PR-14P; PR-14P access is via Calle Romaguera; cardinal direction changes from north–south to east–west
Ponce	Río Portugués	1.7– 1.8	1.1– 1.1	Puente La Milagrosa	
Ponce	Machuelo Abajo	2.2	1.4	PR-14P west (Avenida Tito Castro) – Ponce	Eastern terminus of PR-14P
Ponce	Machuelo Abajo	2.6	1.6	PR-12 south	Seagull intersection; northern terminus of PR-12; access to the Port of Ponce
Ponce	Machuelo Abajo–Machuelo Arriba line	4.6– 4.8	2.9– 3.0	PR-10 to PR-52 – Adjuntas, San Juan, Mayagüez	Diamond interchange; access to PR-139, PR-505 and Mercedita International Airport; PR-52 exit 98A
Ponce	Cerrillos	5.9	3.7	PR-5139	Southern terminus of PR-5139; access to Jayuya, Cerrillos Dam and Parque Luis A. "Wito" Morales
Ponce	Coto Laurel	8.8	5.5	PR-506 (Carretera Doctor Humberto Zayas Chardón) – Sector Santo Domingo	Northern terminus of PR-506; access to PR-52; PR-52 exit 95
Ponce	Coto Laurel–Real line	9.9	6.2	PR-511	Southern terminus of PR-511; access to Real and Anón
Juana Díaz	Callabo	10.9	6.8	PR-512 – Callabo, Collores	Southern terminus of PR-512
Juana Díaz	Jacaguas	11.5	7.1	PR-574 – Olla Honda; PR-580 – Lloréns	Northern terminus of PR-574 and southern terminus of PR-580
Juana Díaz	Jacaguas	11.8	7.3	PR-573	Northern terminus of PR-573
Juana Díaz	Juana Díaz barrio-pueblo–Lomas line	13.7	8.5	PR-149 to PR-52 – Villalba, San Juan	PR-52 access is via PR-149 south; PR-52 exit 91
Juana Díaz	Juana Díaz barrio-pueblo	14.0	8.7	PR-570	One-way street; southern terminus of PR-570
Juana Díaz	Juana Díaz barrio-pueblo	14.1	8.8	PR-592	One-way street; northern terminus of PR-592; access to Amuelas
Juana Díaz	Tijeras	15.6	9.7	PR-510 – Agua Salada	Northern terminus of PR-510; access to Amuelas
Juana Díaz	Tijeras	16.6	10.3	PR-551	Southern terminus of PR-551; access to Guayabal
Juana Díaz	Río Cañas Arriba–Río Cañas Abajo line	18.5	11.5	PR-535 – Río Cañas Abajo	Northern terminus of PR-535
Juana Díaz	Río Cañas Arriba–Río Cañas Abajo line	19.5	12.1	PR-540 – Río Cañas Arriba	Southern terminus of PR-540
Juana Díaz	Río Cañas Arriba–Río Cañas Abajo line	22.7	14.1	PR-536 – Santa Isabel	Northern terminus of PR-536; access to Descalabrado
Juana Díaz	Río Cañas Arriba–Río Cañas Abajo line	23.7	14.7	PR-586	Eastern terminus of PR-586
Río Descalabrado		23.8– 23.9	14.8– 14.9	Puente Obispo Zengotita	
Coamo	Los Llanos	26.3– 26.4	16.3– 16.4	PR-545 – Gabia, Llanos	
Coamo	San Ildefonso	29.7– 29.8	18.5– 18.5	PR-5559	Southern terminus of PR-5559; access to Santa Catalina
Coamo	San Ildefonso	29.9	18.6	Puente General Méndez Vigo over the Río de la Mina	
Coamo	San Ildefonso	30.8– 30.9	19.1– 19.2	PR-138 north – Orocovis PR-153 south – Santa Isabel	Roundabout; southern terminus of PR-138 and northern terminus of PR-153
Coamo	Coamo barrio-pueblo	32.8	20.4	PR-150	Eastern terminus of PR-150; access to Villalba
Coamo	Coamo barrio-pueblo	33.1	20.6	PR-155	One-way street; southern terminus of PR-155; northbound access (to Orocovis) is via Calle Carrión Maduro or Calle Mario Brashi; unsigned
Coamo	Coamo barrio-pueblo	33.7	20.9	Puente Padre Íñigo over the Río Coamo	
Coamo	Palmarejo–Coamo barrio-pueblo line	33.8– 33.9	21.0– 21.1	PR-702 – Palmarejo, Cuyón	Western terminus of PR-702
Coamo	Coamo barrio-pueblo	34.2	21.3	PR-5558	Southern terminus of PR-5558; access to Pasto
Coamo	Palmarejo	35.7	22.2	PR-238 west – Santa Isabel	Eastern terminus of PR-238 (former PR-138)
Coamo	Río Cuyón	38.8	24.1	Puente de las Calabazas	
Aibonito	Pasto–Asomante line	45.9	28.5	PR-723 (Ruta Panorámica Luis Muñoz Marín) – Pulguillas	Eastern terminus of PR-723 and western terminus of the Ruta Panorámica concurrency; the Ruta Panorámica continues toward Barranquitas
Aibonito	Pasto–Asomante line	46.8	29.1	PR-7718 east to PR-162 (Note: PR-7718 is also known as Paseo Don Julio Francisco "Paco" Santos Vázquez.)	Western terminus of PR-7718 and eastern terminus of the Ruta Panorámica concurrency; the Ruta Panorámica continues toward Cayey; access to Mirador Piedra Degetau
Aibonito	Pasto–Llanos– Asomante tripoint	47.3	29.4	PR-162 north – Barranquitas	Western terminus of PR-162 concurrency
Aibonito	Aibonito barrio-pueblo	49.7– 49.8	30.9– 30.9	PR-724 – San Luis	Southern terminus of PR-724; access to Llanos
Aibonito	Aibonito barrio-pueblo	49.8– 49.9	30.9– 31.0	PR-7719	Northern terminus of PR-7719; access to Pasto
Aibonito	Aibonito barrio-pueblo	50.2	31.2	PR-725	One-way street; counterclockwise terminus of PR-725; access to Llanos
Aibonito	Aibonito barrio-pueblo	50.3	31.3	PR-162	One-way street; eastern terminus of PR-162 concurrency; access to Cuyón; unsigned
Aibonito	Aibonito barrio-pueblo	50.5	31.4	PR-726	Counterclockwise terminus of PR-726; access to Caonillas
Aibonito	Aibonito barrio-pueblo	50.9	31.6	PR-721	Northern terminus of PR-721
Aibonito	Aibonito barrio-pueblo	51.0	31.7	PR-722	Clockwise terminus of PR-722; access to Robles; unsigned
Aibonito	Robles–Plata line	54.9	34.1	PR-727 – La Plata	Western terminus of PR-727
Aibonito	Robles–Plata line	56.8– 56.9	35.3– 35.4	Puente de Quebrada Honda over the Quebrada Honda	
Aibonito	Robles–Plata line	57.2	35.5	PR-173 east – Cidra, La Plata	Southern terminus of PR-173
Río Matón		62.9– 63.0	39.1– 39.1	Puente del Río Matón	
Cayey	Matón Abajo	63.0	39.1	PR-730 / PR-7730	Western terminus of PR-730 and southern terminus of PR-7730; Matón Abajo access is via PR-730; Honduras access is via PR-7730
Cayey	Toíta–Cayey barrio-pueblo line	68.3	42.4	PR-730	Eastern terminus of PR-730; access to Matón Arriba
Cayey	Cayey barrio-pueblo	68.7– 68.8	42.7– 42.8	PR-206	Northern terminus of PR-206; access to Salinas; unsigned
Cayey	Cayey barrio-pueblo	69.8	43.4	Calle Luis Muñoz Rivera (PR-170) / PR-731	One-way street; northern terminus of PR-170 and southern terminus of PR-731; PR-170 access is via Calle José Celso Barbosa; PR-731 access is via Calle Manuel Corchado y Juarbe and Calle Román Baldorioty de Castro; unsigned
Cayey	Cayey barrio-pueblo	70.1	43.6	Puente Santo Domingo over the Quebrada Santo Domingo	
Cayey	Cayey barrio-pueblo	70.1	43.6	PR-15 south to PR-52	Northern terminus of PR-15; access to PR-52 and Guayama; PR-52 exit 39
Cayey	Cayey barrio-pueblo	71.2	44.2	PR-171 – Cidra	Southern terminus of PR-171
Cayey	Cayey barrio-pueblo	71.7	44.6	PR-7014	Southern terminus of PR-7014; unsigned
Cayey	Cayey barrio-pueblo–Monte Llano line	73.1	45.4	PR-1 – Caguas, Aibonito	Eastern terminus of PR-14; the Carretera Central continues toward Cidra
1.000 mi = 1.609 km; 1.000 km = 0.621 mi: Concurrency terminus; Incomplete access

== Related route ==
Highway 14R
- Location: Ponce
- Length: 0.9 km (0.56 mi; 3,000 ft)

Puerto Rico Highway 14R (Spanish: Carretera Ramal 14, abbreviated Ramal PR-14 or PR-14R) is a road that branches off from PR-14 and ends at PR-123 in downtown Ponce. Its route is part of Unión and Guadalupe streets. The entire route is located in Ponce.

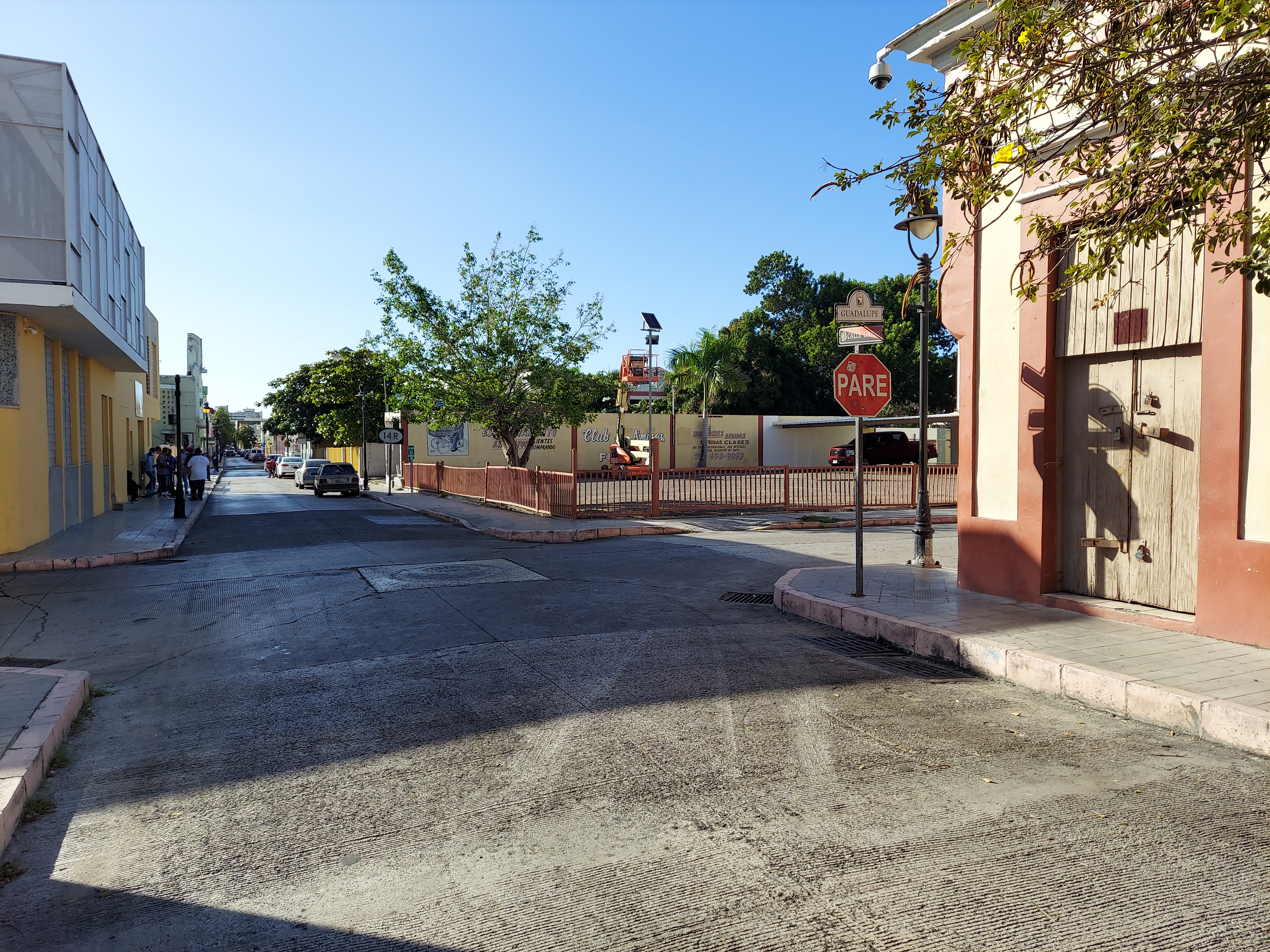
Puerto Rico Highway 14R through Calle Unión, near km 0.5

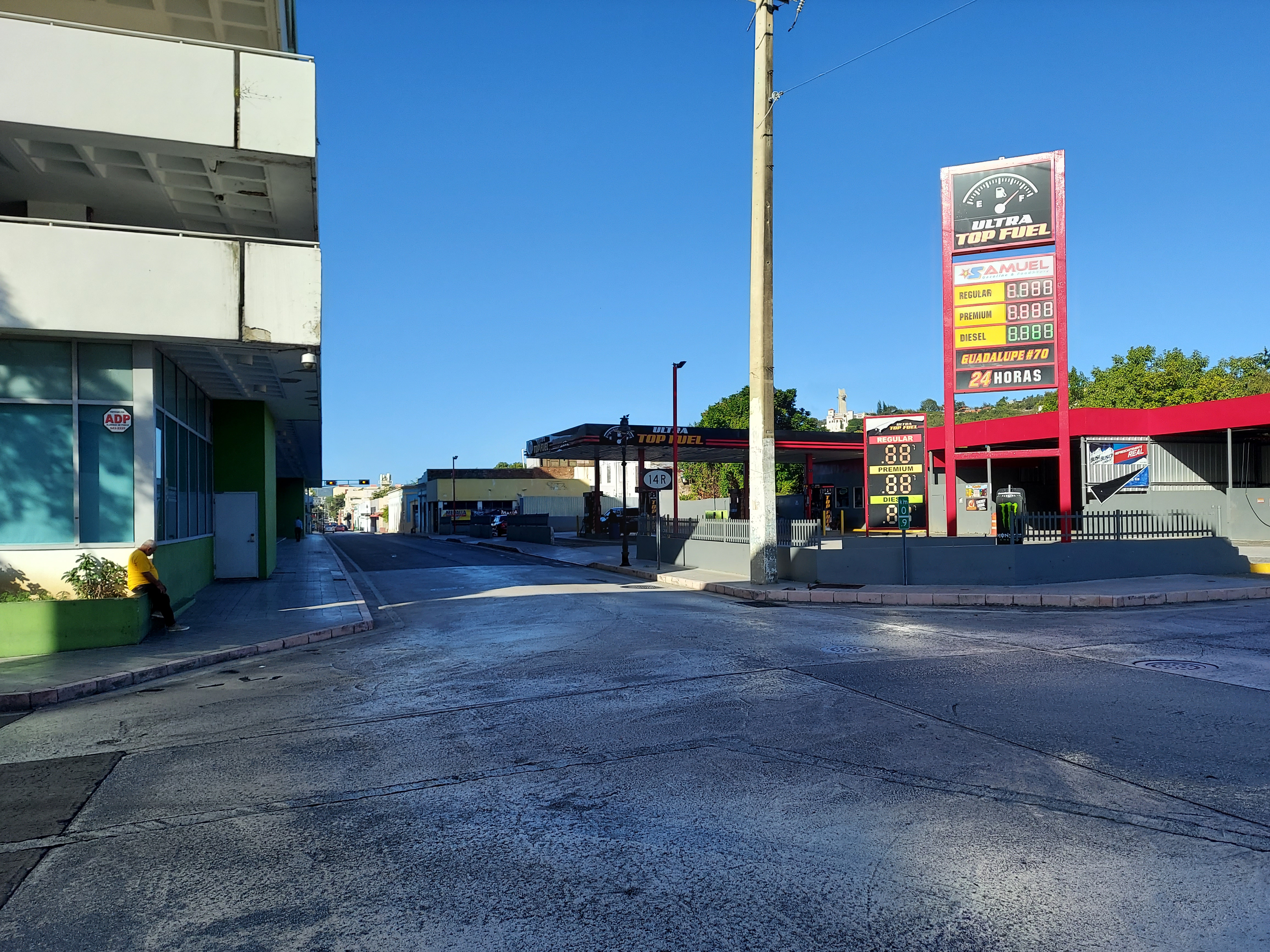
Puerto Rico Highway 14R through Calle Guadalupe, near km 0.9

Location	km	mi	Destinations	Notes
Primero–Segundo line	0.0	0.0	Calle Villa (PR-123 south)	One-way streets; southern terminus of PR-14R and northern terminus of PR-123P; unsigned
Segundo	0.5– 0.6	0.31– 0.37	Southern terminus of PR-14R through Calle Unión and western terminus of PR-14R through Calle Guadalupe	
Quinto–Sexto line	0.9	0.56	PR-14 east	One-way streets; northern terminus of PR-14R and western terminus of PR-14P; PR-14P access is via Calle Romaguera; unsigned
1.000 mi = 1.609 km; 1.000 km = 0.621 mi: Incomplete access; Route transition

== See also ==
- List of highways in Ponce, Puerto Rico
- List of streets in Ponce, Puerto Rico
