= Puerto Rico Highway 238 =

Highway in Puerto Rico

Highway 238
- Ruta 238
- Desvío Sur de Coamo

Route information
- Maintained by Puerto Rico DTPW
- Length: 5.0 km (3.1 mi)

Major junctions
- West end: PR-153 in San Ildefonso
- PR-702 in Palmarejo
- East end: PR-14 in Palmarejo

Location
- Country: United States
- Territory: Puerto Rico
- Municipalities: Coamo

Highway system
- Roads in Puerto Rico; List
| ← PR-212 | → PR-239 |

Puerto Rico Highway 238 (PR-238) is an east–west bypass located southeast of downtown Coamo, Puerto Rico. This road extends from PR-153 to PR-14 and is known as Desvío Sur.

== Major intersections ==
The entire route is located in Coamo.

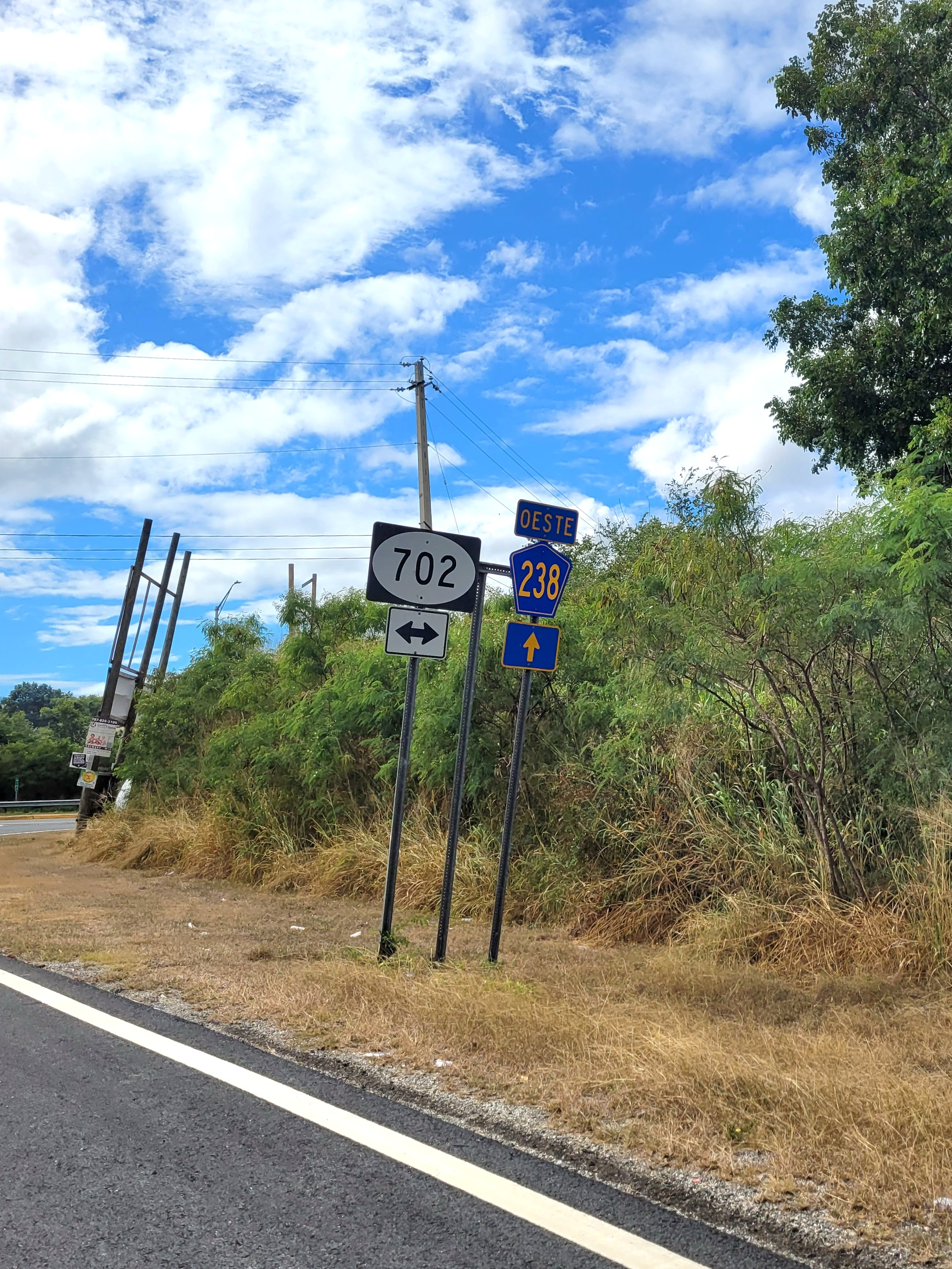
PR-238 at its junction with PR-702 in Palmarejo barrio

| Location | km | mi | Destinations | Notes |
|---|---|---|---|---|
| San Ildefonso | 0.0 | 0.0 | PR-153 – Coamo, Santa Isabel | Western terminus of PR-238 |
| Palmarejo | 4.3 | 2.7 | PR-702 – Coamo | All-way stop; access to Palmarejo and Cuyón |
| Palmarejo | 5.0 | 3.1 | PR-14 – Coamo, Aibonito | Eastern terminus of PR-238 |
1.000 mi = 1.609 km; 1.000 km = 0.621 mi
