= 1953 Puerto Rico highway renumbering =

Insular highways renumbered

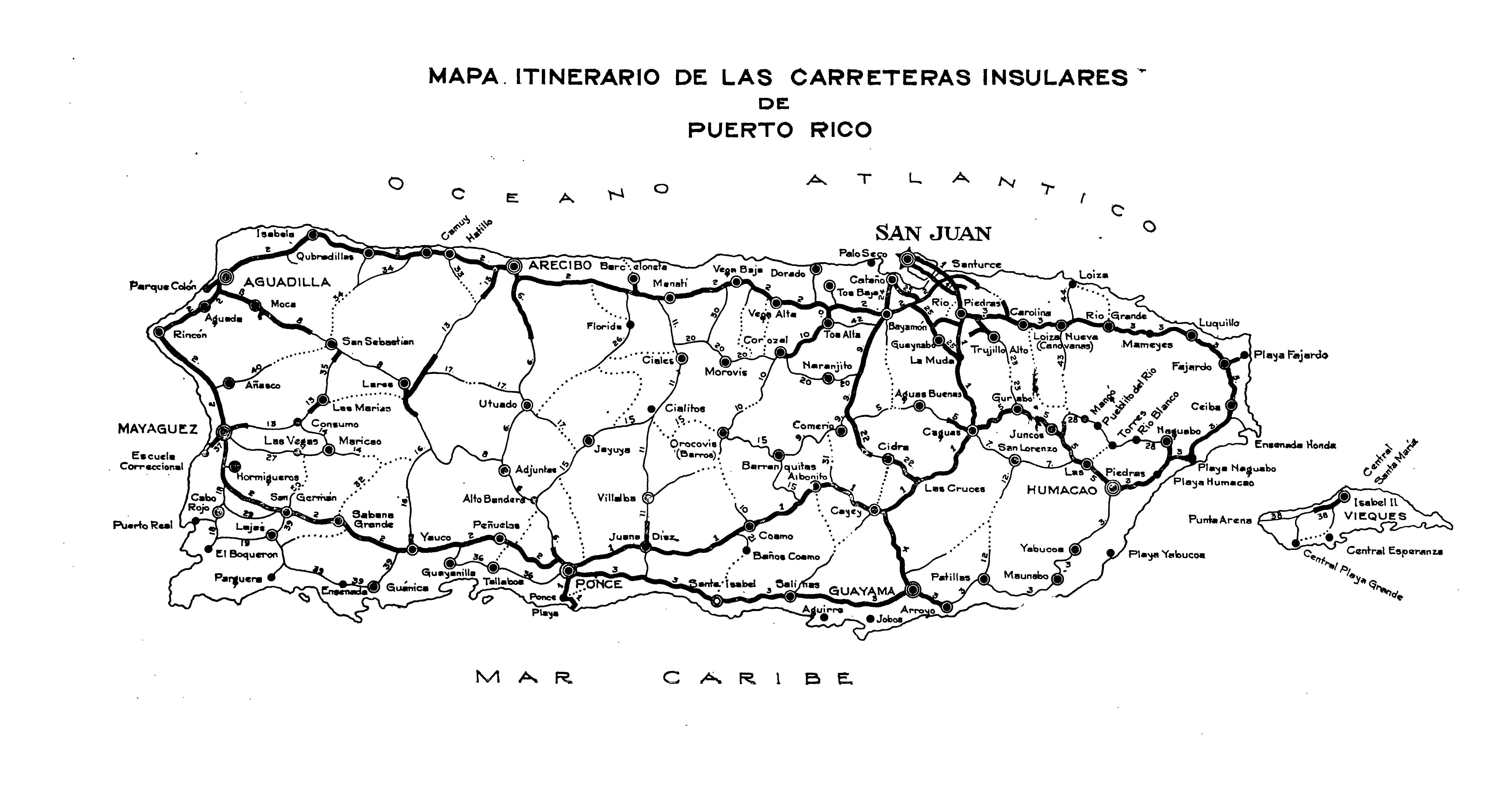
- Highways in P.R. August 1928

System information
- Formed: 1953

Highway names
- Pre-Commonwealth: Insular Highway nn (Hwy nn)
- Post-Commonwealth: Puerto Rico Highway nn (PR-nn)

System links
- Roads in Puerto Rico; List

This article is part of the highway renumbering series.
Alabama	1928, 1957
Arkansas	1926
California	1964
Colorado	1953, 1968
Connecticut	1932, 1963
Florida	1945
Indiana	1926
Iowa	1926, 1969
Louisiana	1955
Maine	1933
Massachusetts	1933
Minnesota	1934
Missouri	1926
Montana	1932
Nebraska	1926
Nevada	1976
New Jersey	1927, 1953
New Mexico	1926, 1988
New York	1927, 1930
North Carolina	1934, 1937, 1940, 1961
North Dakota	1926
Ohio	1923, 1927, 1962
Pennsylvania	1928, 1961
Puerto Rico	1953
South Carolina	1928, 1937
South Dakota	1927, 1975
Tennessee	1983
Texas	1939, 1990
Utah	1962, 1977
Virginia	1923, 1928, 1933, 1940, 1958
Washington	1964
Wisconsin	1926
Wyoming	1927

In 1953, the Puerto Rico Department of Transportation and Public Works implemented a major renumbering of its insular highways. Before 1953, highway routes were numbered in the 1 to just over 100 range and were distributed randomly throughout the island, resulting in several routes with long road lengths. The numbering system adopted in 1953, which is in use today, increased the range of route numbers from the just-over-100 to 999, resulting in a decrease in the length of many routes. This new numbering system follows a grid pattern for highways numbered between 100 and 999, with the lower numbered roads found to the west and systematically increasing towards 999 as the traveler moves easterly. Although PR-1, PR-2 and PR-3 routes had notable changes in some of their segments, these three are the only highways that kept their route numbers intact due to their interregional prominence.

== History ==
The first major roadways in Puerto Rico were built by the Government of Spain. By 1898, the year when Puerto Rico was ceded by Spain to the United States, 275 kilometers (171 mi) of roadways had been built. Additionally, 615 km (382 mi) were built between 1898 and 1908, 300 km (190 mi) more were added from 1908 to 1918, and 483 km (300 mi) were added from 1918 to 1927. By March 1928, there were 12 districts and some highway routes, particularly routes number 1, 2 and 3, crossed multiple districts. Some of the highways within the 12 districts included: (Note: See also pp. 1558-1560 of this article titled "Concurso entre el Personal de Conservación de Carreteras, Departamento del Interior" in Revista de Obras Publicas de Puerto Rico, Year V, Issue 51, March 1928. Published by the Department of the Interior and the Puerto Rico Society of Engineers. San Juan, Puerto Rico. Accessed 3 November 2019.)

District	Road Numbers	Notes
1	1, 3	
2	1, 2, 3, 16	
3	2, 13, 27	
4	3, 4, Salinas-Cayey	
5	2, 6, 13, 33, 34	
6	6, 15, 17	
7	1, 9, 10, 15	
8	3, 5, 7, 28	
9	2, 9, 10, 24	
10	2, 8, 11, Guajataca	
11	2, 11, 20	
12	8, 13	

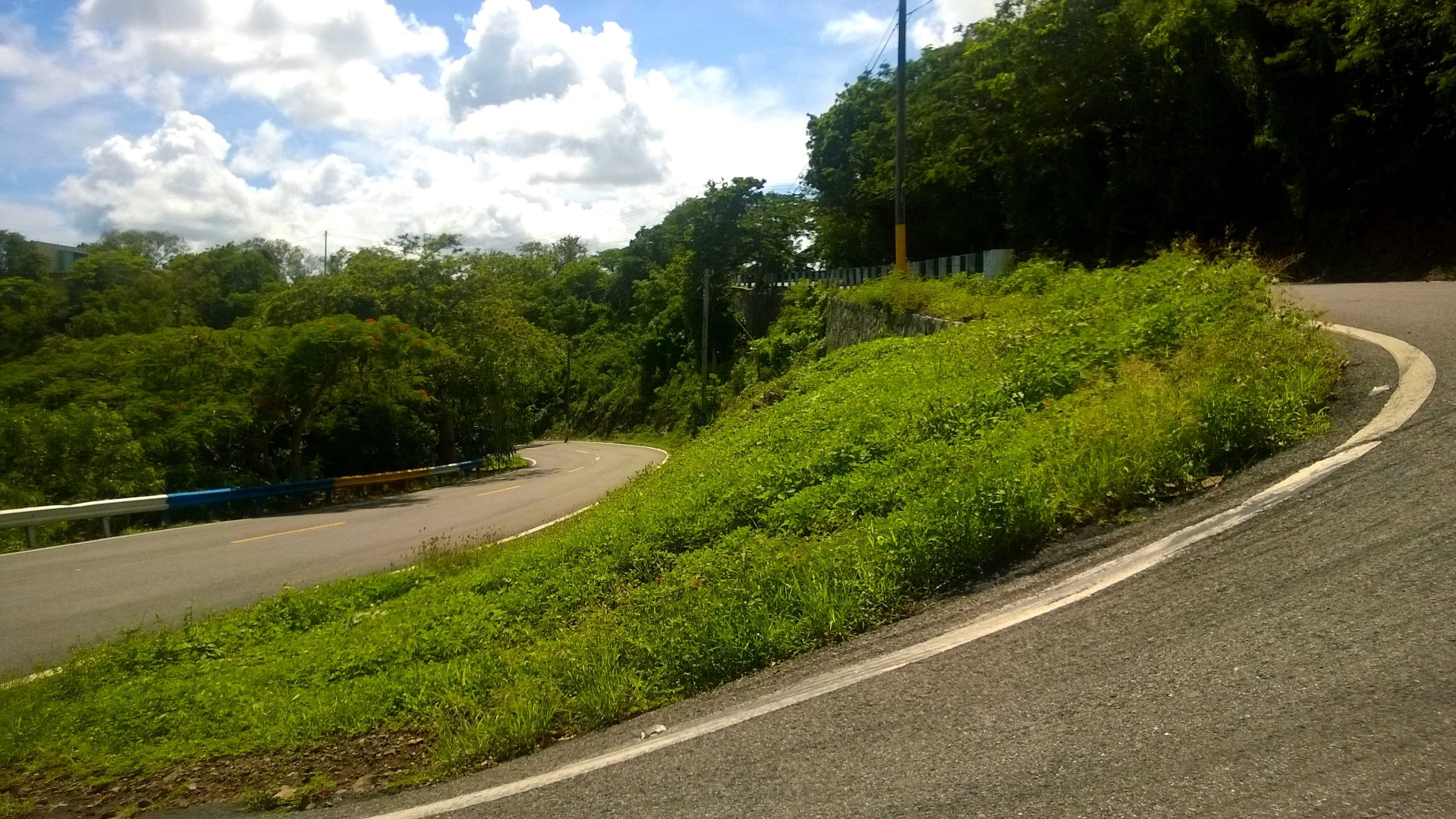
Road from San Juan to Ponce in Aibonito

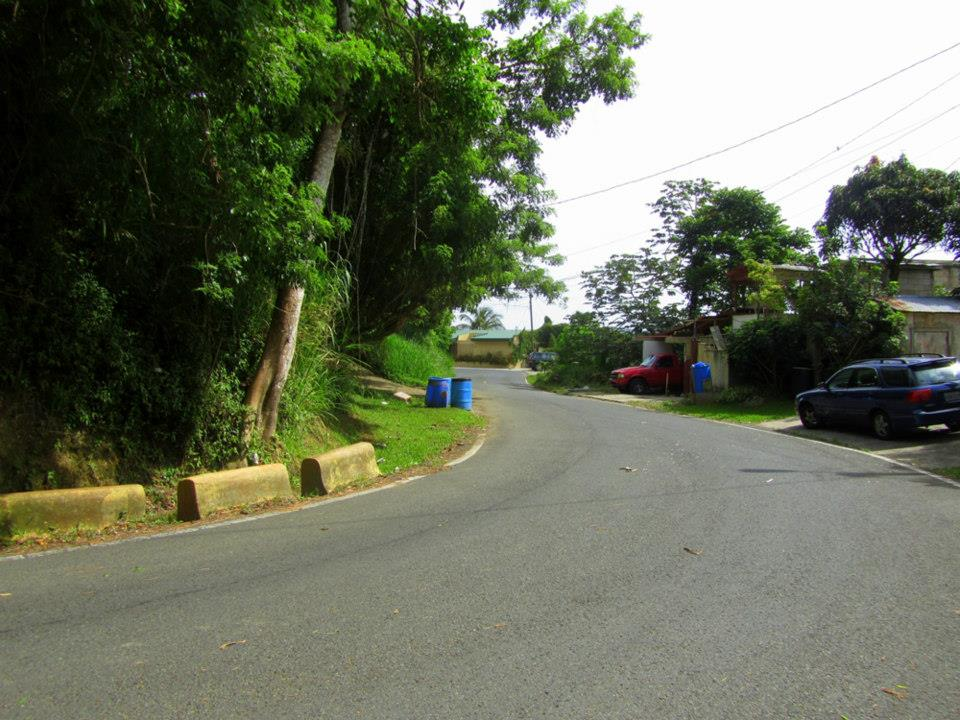
Road from Cayey to Guayama in Cayey

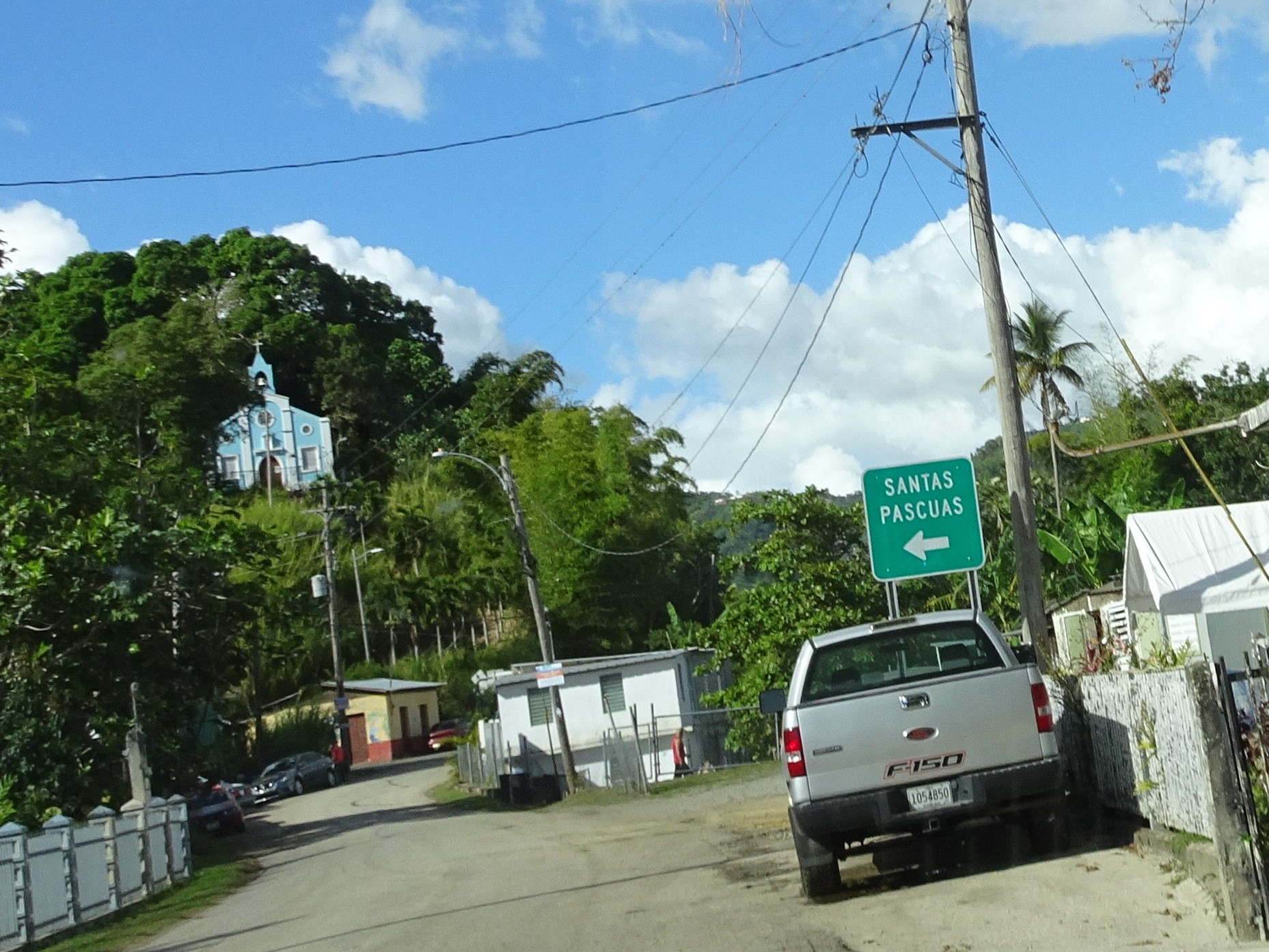
Road from Ponce to Arecibo in Ponce

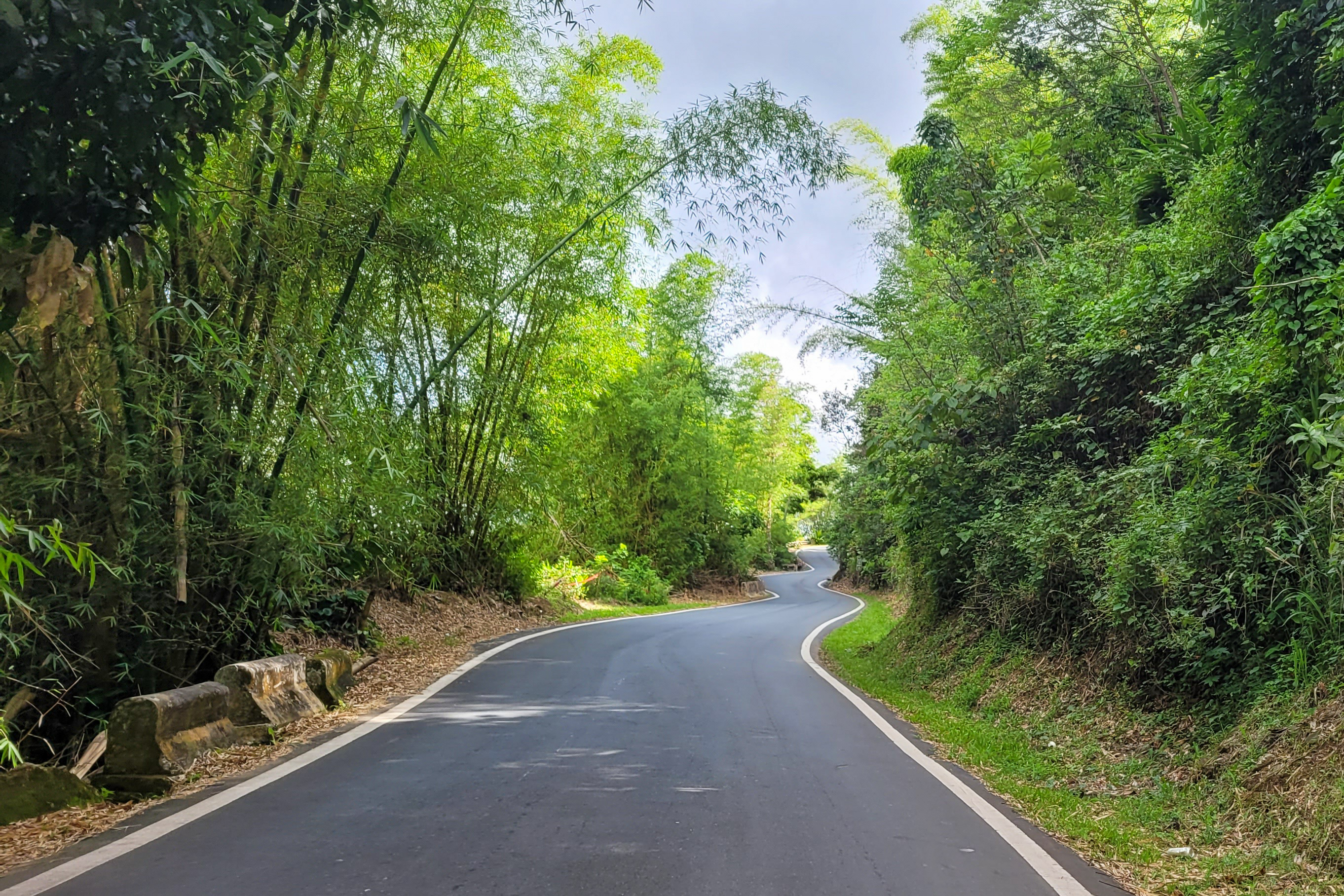
Road from Orocovis to Corozal in Orocovis

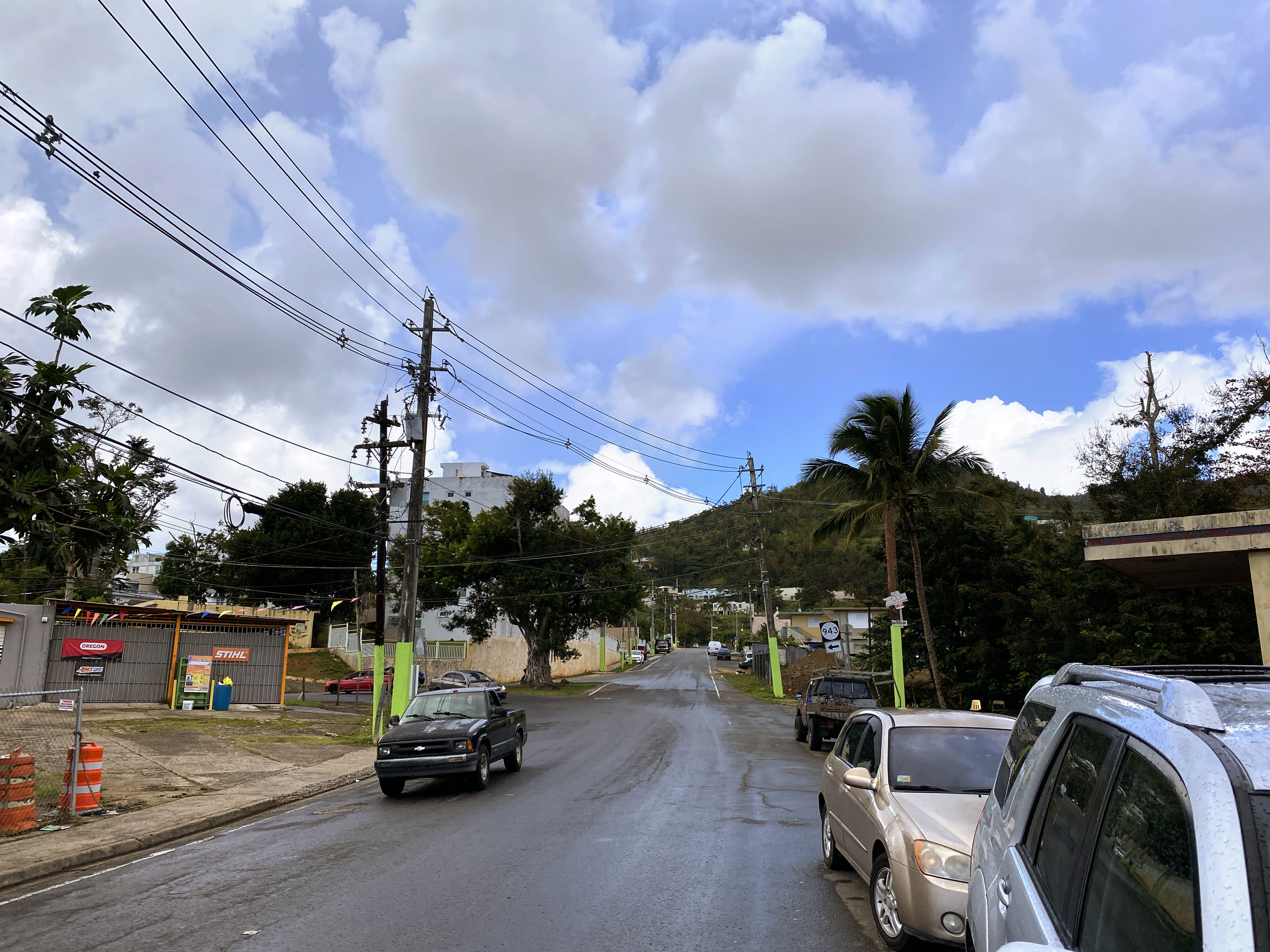
Road from Gurabo to San Juan in Gurabo

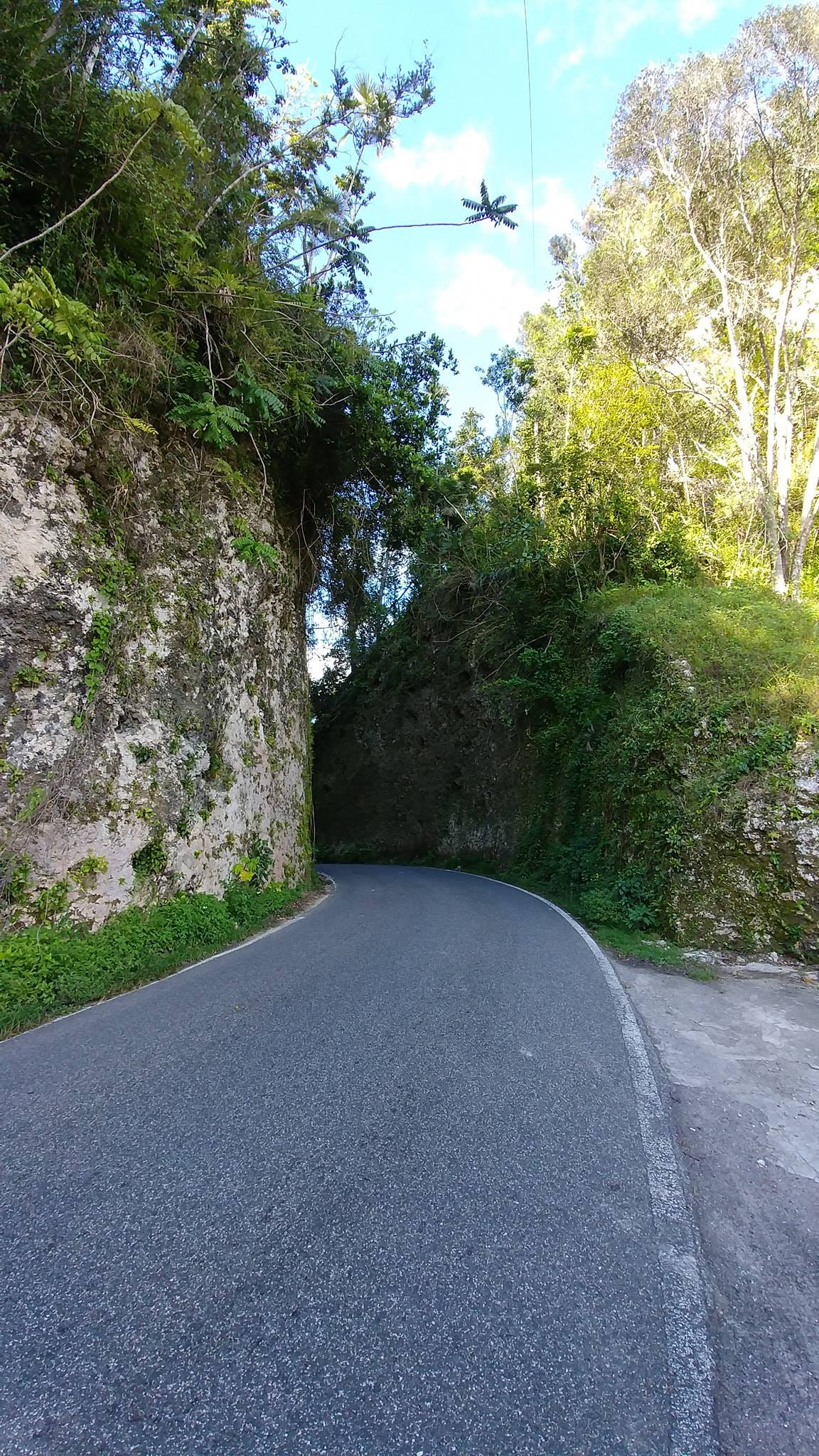
Road from Utuado to Barceloneta in Ciales

== List of highways ==
Old Number	Southern or western terminus	Northern or eastern terminus	Length, km (mi)	New Number/s	Notes
Route 1	Barrio Playa in Ponce	La Fortaleza in San Juan	136.7 (84.9)	PR-123, PR-14, PR-1, PR-25	Carretera Central. Parts of PR-14R, PR-735, PR-798, PR-8834, PR-873 and PR-8838 belong to original segments of this highway.
Route 2	Route 6 in Ponce	Route 1 in San Juan	261.2 (162.3)	PR-132, PR-2, PR-115, PR-23, PR-1, PR-39	Parts of PR-127, PR-121, PR-102, PR-114, PR-239 (formerly PR-2R), PR-104, PR-439, PR-4439, PR-1107 (formerly PR-111), PR-460, PR-469, PR-112, PR-113, PR-479, PR-484, PR-4491, PR-119, PR-4490, PR-660, PR-681, PR-6681, PR-662, PR-669, PR-670, PR-155, PR-160, PR-676, PR-680, PR-165, PR-8865, PR-864, PR-855, PR-41 and PR-42 belong to original segments of this highway.
Route 3	Route 1 in Ponce	Route 1 in San Juan	199.7 (124.1)	PR-133, PR-1, PR-3	Parts of PR-578, PR-5507, PR-178, PR-182, PR-9910, PR-979, PR-194, PR-940, PR-193, PR-955, PR-187, PR-187R, PR-958, PR-9958, PR-9959, PR-874, PR-887 and PR-47 belong to original segments of this highway.
Route 4	Route 3 in Guayama	Route 1 in Cayey	26.0 (16.2)	PR-15	
Route 5	Route 22 in Comerío	Route 3 in Humacao	—	PR-156, PR-189, PR-198	PR-7156 and PR-768 belong to original segments of this highway.
Route 6	Route 1 in Ponce	Route 2 in Arecibo	81.8 (50.8)	PR-123, PR-10	PR-6609 and PR-6109 belong to an original segment of this highway.
Route 7	Route 1 in Caguas	Route 5 in Las Piedras	22.0 (13.7)	PR-183	Parts of PR-9931, PR-181 and PR-980 belong to original segments of this highway.
Route 8	Route 2 in Aguadilla	Route 6 in Adjuntas	82.4 (51.2)	PR-111, PR-128, PR-135	Parts of PR-1107 (formerly PR-111), PR-4443, PR-125, PR-125R, PR-4111 and PR-1111 belong to original segments of this highway.
Route 9	Route 15 in Barranquitas	Route 2 in Bayamón	43.5 (27.0)	PR-156, PR-167	PR-839 belongs to an original segment of this highway.
Route 10	Route 1 in Coamo	Route 2 in Dorado	—	PR-155, PR-568, PR-159, PR-165	Parts of PR-5155, PR-891 and PR-165R belong to original segments of this highway.
Route 11	Route 1 in Juana Díaz	Route 2 in Manatí	67.4 (41.9)	PR-149	Parts of PR-570, PR-519, PR-5550, PR-550, PR-589, PR-149R, PR-146 and PR-6685 belong to original segments of this highway.
Route 12	Route 3 in Patillas	Route 7 in San Lorenzo	—	PR-181	Part of PR-183 belongs to an original segment of this highway.
Route 13	Route 8 in Lares	Route 2 in Arecibo	33.6 (20.9)	PR-111, PR-129	Parts of PR-1111 and PR-134 belong to original segments of this highway.
Route 14	Route 35 in Mayagüez	Route 16 in Maricao	—	PR-106, PR-120, PR-105	
Route 15	Route 6 in Adjuntas	Route 1 in Aibonito	60.6 (37.7)	PR-143, PR-140, PR-144, PR-141, PR-533, PR-157, PR-155, PR-156, PR-162	The northern part of PR-5155 belongs to an original segment of this highway. This road was briefly interrupted by Route 11 in Ciales.
Route 16	Route 2 in Yauco	Route 8 in Lares	35.4 (22.0)	PR-128	Parts of PR-375, PR-371 and PR-3372 belong to an original segment of this highway.
Route 17	Route 13 in Lares	Route 15 in Jayuya	—	PR-111, PR-140	PR-6111 belongs to an original segment of this highway. This road was briefly interrupted by Route 6 in Utuado.
Route 18	Route 19 in Cabo Rojo	Route 2 in Cabo Rojo	17.7 (11.0)	PR-307, PR-308, PR-103, PR-102	
Route 19	Barrio Boquerón in Cabo Rojo	Route 39 in Lajas	10.0 (6.2)	PR-101	
Route 20	Route 11 in Ciales	Route 9 in Naranjito	38.6 (24.0)	PR-633, PR-155, PR-159, PR-164	Parts of PR-6633 and PR-149 belong to an original segment of this highway. This road was interrupted by Route 10 into two segments: one from Ciales to western Corozal and the other from eastern Corozal to Naranjito.
Route 21	Baños de Coamo in Coamo	Route 1 in Coamo	4.0 (2.5)	PR-546, PR-153	
Route 22	Route 9 in Comerío	Route 1 in Cidra	22.5 (14.0)	PR-172, PR-787	Part of PR-7167, PR-781 and PR-156 belong to an original segment of this highway.
Route 23	Route 5 in Gurabo	Route 3 in San Juan	—	PR-181	PR-943, PR-876 and PR-877 belong to original segments of this highway.
Route 24	Route 2 in Bayamón	Barrio Pueblo in Cataño	7.2 (4.5)	PR-5	PR-890 belongs to an original segment of this highway.
Route 25	Route 1 in Guaynabo	Route 24 in Cataño	13.6 (8.5)	PR-20, PR-165	PR-169, PR-19 and PR-24 belong to original segments of this highway. This road was briefly interrupted by Route 2 in San Patricio area.
Route 26	Route 17 in Utuado	Route 2 in Barceloneta	—	PR-140	
Route 27	Route 2 in Mayagüez	Route 14 in Maricao	26.0 (16.2)	PR-105	
Route 28	Route 5 in Juncos	Route 3 in Naguabo	24.5 (15.2)	PR-31, PR-192	
Route 29	Route 18 in Cabo Rojo	Route 2 in San Germán	7.4 (4.6)	PR-102, PR-317	
Route 30	Route 20 in Morovis	Route 2 in Vega Baja	11.2 (7.0)	PR-155	
Route 31	Route 1 in Aibonito	Route 9 in Comerío	—	PR-173, PR-775, PR-740	Part of PR-727 belongs to an original segment of this highway.
Route 32	Route 3 in San Juan	Route 1 in San Juan	—	PR-27, PR-36	
Route 33	Route 13 in Hatillo	Route 2 in Hatillo	—	PR-130	
Route 34	Route 8 in San Sebastián	Route 2 in Camuy	—	PR-119	
Route 35	Route 2 in Mayagüez	Route 8 in San Sebastián	41.8 (26.0)	PR-106, PR-119	Formerly portion of Route 13
Route 36	Route 2 in Guayanilla	Route 2 in Ponce	23.9 (14.9)	PR-127, PR-2, PR-2R	PR-591 and PR-5549 belong to original segments of this highway.
Route 37	Route 18 in Cabo Rojo	Route 2 in Mayagüez	—	PR-102	
Route 38	Route 69 in Vieques	Barrio Puerto Diablo in Vieques	—	PR-200	
Route 39	Route 2 in San Germán	Route 2 in Yauco	33.0 (20.5)	PR-101, PR-116	PR-320, PR-315, PR-3116, PR-4116 and PR-326 (formerly PR-116R) belong to original segments of this highway.
Route 40	Route 2 in Añasco	Route 8 in San Sebastián	—	PR-109	
Route 41	Route 1 in San Juan	Route 1 in San Juan	6.5 (4.0)	PR-35	Part of PR-1 and PR-16 belong to an original segment of this highway.
Route 42	Route 10 in Toa Alta	Route 9 in Bayamón	11.2 (7.0)	PR-861	
Route 43	Route 5 in Juncos	Route 3 in Canóvanas	—	PR-185	PR-952 belongs to an original segment of this highway.
Route 44	Route 3 in Canóvanas	Route 3 in Río Grande	—	PR-951, PR-187	
Route 45	Route 46 in San Juan	Route 2 in San Juan	—	PR-18, PR-41	
Route 46	Route 25 in San Juan	Route 1 in San Juan	5.0 (3.1)	PR-21	
Route 47	Route 3 in Salinas	Route 1 in Cayey	—	PR-1, PR-170	
Route 48	Route 47 in Aibonito	Route 1 in Aibonito	—	PR-162	
Route 49	Route 1 in Cayey	Route 22 in Cidra	—	PR-171	PR-7731 belongs to an original segment of this highway.
Route 50	Route 2 in Mayagüez	Route 2 in San Germán	—	PR-348, PR-119	Parts of PR-2, PR-360 and PR-347 belong to an original segment of this highway.
Route 51	Route 1 in Ponce	Route 15 in Jayuya	—	PR-139, PR-143	PR-139R belongs to an original segment of this highway.
Route 52	Route 2 in Toa Baja	Playa de Sardinera in Dorado	—	PR-165, PR-6165, PR-693, PR-697	PR-854 belongs to an original segment of this highway.
Route 53	Route 2 in Dorado	Route 52 in Dorado	—	PR-693	
Route 54	Route 20 in Morovis	Route 2 in Vega Baja	—	PR-160	
Route 55	Route 2 in Arecibo	Route 96 in Barceloneta	—	PR-681	
Route 56	Route 39 in Lajas	Route 2 in Sabana Grande	—	PR-117	
Route 57	Route 3 in Carolina	Route 1 in San Juan	—	PR-26	Parts of PR-8887, PR-190 and PR-37 belong to original segments of this highway.
Route 58	Route 43 in Carolina	Route 3 in Carolina	—	PR-853	
Route 60	Route 3 in Ceiba	Barrio Machos in Ceiba	—	Formerly PR-980	Roosevelt Roads Naval Station
Route 61	Route 3 in Juana Díaz	Route 1 in Juana Díaz	6.6 (4.1)	PR-149	PR-592 belongs to an original segment of this highway.
Route 62	Route 4 in Guayama	Route 1 in Cidra	—	PR-179, PR-184	PR-7736 belongs to an original segment of this highway.
Route 63	Route 5 in Aguas Buenas	Route 2 in Bayamón	—	PR-174	Part of PR-5 belongs to an original segment of this highway.
Route 64	Route 8 in Adjuntas	Route 13 in Lares	—	PR-129	
Route 65	Route 11 in Villalba	Route 10 in Orocovis	—	PR-150, PR-151, PR-143	
Route 67	Route 23 in Trujillo Alto	Route 23 in Trujillo Alto	—	PR-175, PR-846	
Route 68	Route 34 in Camuy	Route 2 in Quebradillas	—	PR-113	
Route 69	Route 38 in Vieques	Route 38 in Vieques	—	PR-201	
Route 70	Barrio Punta Arenas in Vieques	Route 38 in Vieques	—	PR-200	
Route 73	Route 2 in Añasco	Route 40 in Añasco	—	PR-402	
Route 75	Route 11 in Manatí	Route 30 in Vega Baja	—	PR-643	
Route 77	Route 3 in Santa Isabel	Route 21 in Coamo	—	PR-153	
Route 78	Route 2 in Hormigueros	Route 50 in Mayagüez	—	PR-309, PR-344	
Route 80	Route 2 in Peñuelas	Route 8 in Adjuntas	—	PR-386, PR-131	This road was interrupted between Peñuelas and Adjuntas.
Route 81	Route 2 in Sabana Grande	Route 27 in Maricao	—	PR-120	
Route 82	Route 2 in Hormigueros	Route 2 in Hormigueros	—	PR-319, PR-309, PR-343	
Route 85	Route 35 in Mayagüez	Route 40 in Añasco	—	PR-108	
Route 92	Route 35 in Las Marías	Barrio Buena Vista in Las Marías	—	PR-124, PR-370	
Route 93	Route 92 in Las Marías	Route 8 in Lares	—	PR-124	
Route 96	Route 2 in Barceloneta	Route 2 in Barceloneta	—	PR-140	PR-6140 belongs to an original segment of this highway.
Route 98	Cerro Maravilla in Ponce	Route 11 in Orocovis	—	PR-577, PR-143	
Route 100	Route 15 in Orocovis	Route 20 in Morovis	—	PR-155	
Route 102	Route 10 in Orocovis	Route 15 in Barranquitas	—	PR-143, PR-720	
Route 103	Route 11 in Villalba	Route 10 in Coamo	—	PR-150	
Route 104	Route 77 in Coamo	Route 47 in Salinas	—	PR-154	
Route 107	Route 31 in Cidra	Route 22 in Cidra	—	PR-173	
Route 109	Route 5 in Aguas Buenas	Route 1 in Guaynabo	—	PR-173	
Route 110	Route 1 in Caguas	Route 67 in Trujillo Alto	—	PR-175	
Route 111	Route 7 in San Lorenzo	Route 5 in Gurabo	—	PR-181	
Route 112	Route 28 in Naguabo	Route 3 in Río Grande	—	PR-191	El Yunque National Forest

== See also ==
- List of highways in Ponce, Puerto Rico
