= Puerto Rico Highway 154 =

Highway in Puerto Rico

Highway 154
- Ruta 154

Route information
- Maintained by Puerto Rico DTPW
- Length: 4.0 km (2.5 mi)
- Existed: 1953–present

Major junctions
- West end: PR-153 in San Ildefonso
- PR-576 in San Ildefonso
- East end: PR-543 in San Ildefonso

Location
- Country: United States
- Territory: Puerto Rico
- Municipalities: Coamo, Santa Isabel

Highway system
- Roads in Puerto Rico; List
← PR-153	→ PR-155

Puerto Rico Highway 154 (PR-154) is a rural road in the municipality of Coamo, Puerto Rico. It is between the PR-153 and PR-543 near Salinas and Santa Isabel.

== Major intersections ==
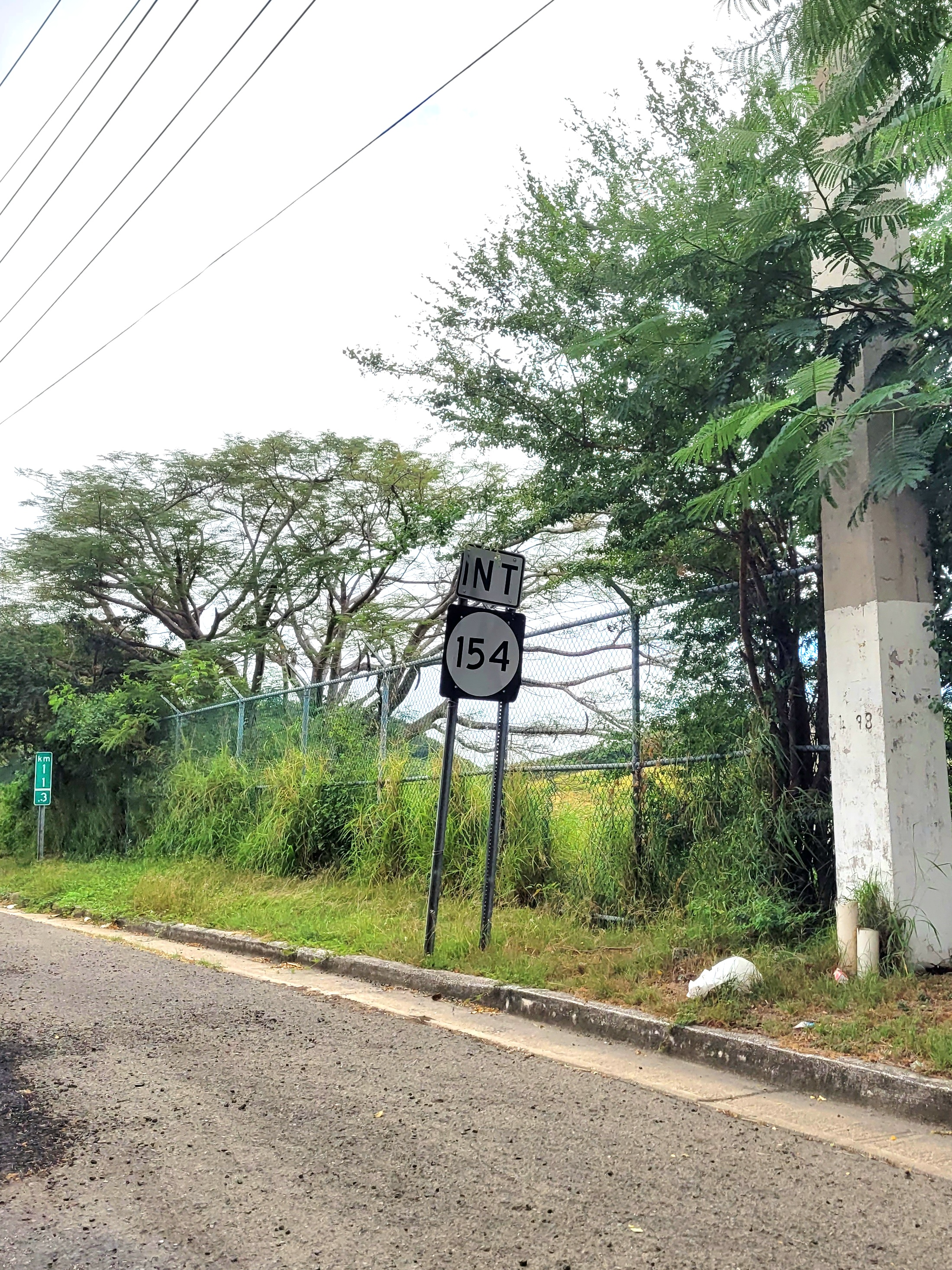
PR-153 near its junction with PR-154 in Coamo

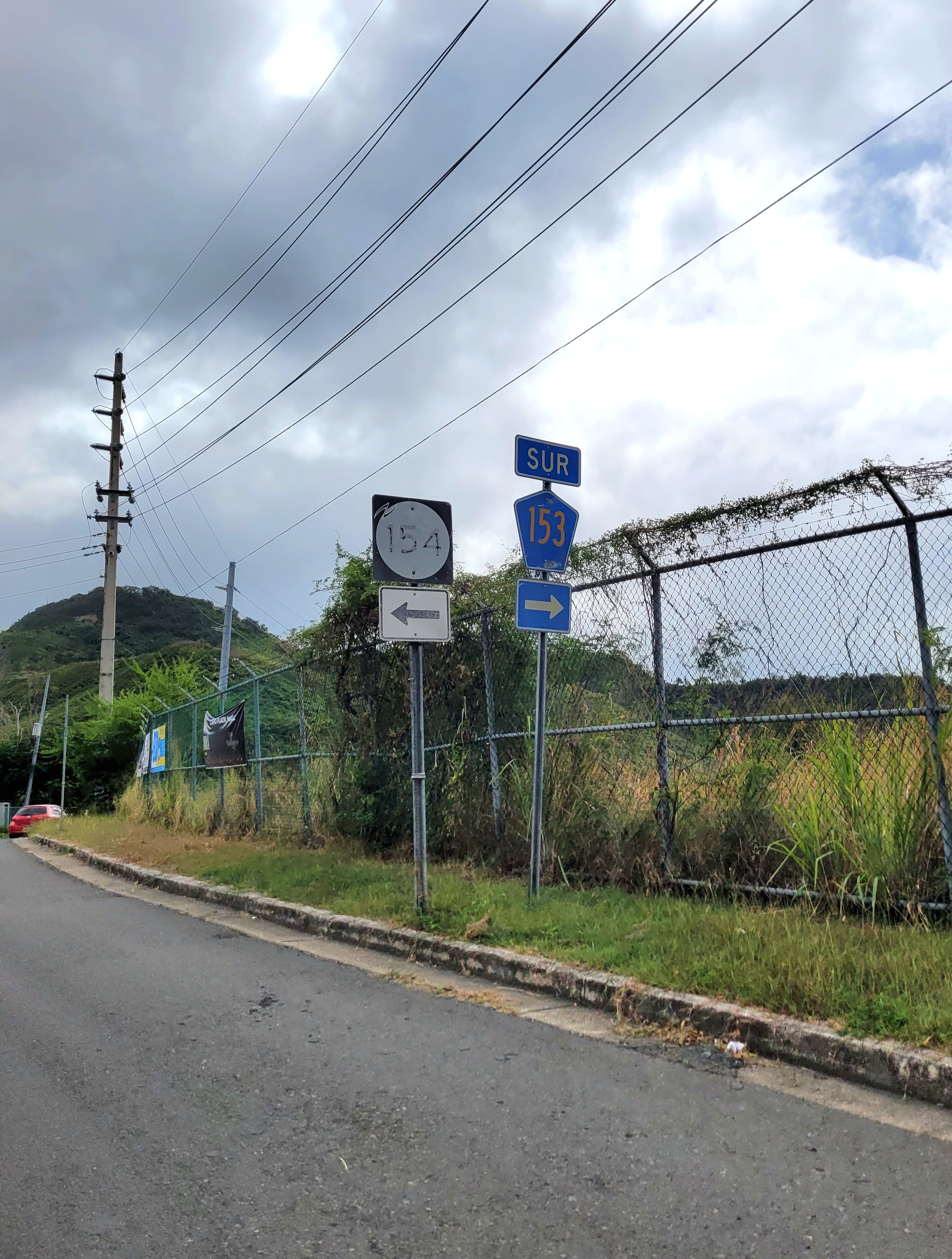
PR-153 at its junction with PR-154 in Coamo

Municipality	Location	km	mi	Destinations	Notes
Coamo	San Ildefonso	0.0	0.0	PR-153 – Coamo, Santa Isabel	Western terminus of PR-154
Santa Isabel	No major junctions				
Coamo	San Ildefonso	3.6– 3.7	2.2– 2.3	PR-576 – Coamo	
Coamo	San Ildefonso	4.0	2.5	PR-543 – Santa Isabel	Eastern terminus of PR-154
1.000 mi = 1.609 km; 1.000 km = 0.621 mi

== See also ==
- 1953 Puerto Rico highway renumbering
