= Puerto Rico Highway 153 =

Highway in Puerto Rico

Highway 153
- Ruta 153

Route information
- Maintained by Puerto Rico DTPW
- Length: 14.4 km (8.9 mi)
- Existed: 1953–present

Major junctions
- South end: PR-1 in Santa Isabel barrio-pueblo
- PR-541 in Santa Isabel barrio-pueblo; PR-161 in Santa Isabel barrio-pueblo–Boca Velázquez; PR-545 in Felicia 2; PR-542 in Felicia 2; PR-52 in Felicia 2; PR-154 in San Ildefonso; PR-546 in San Ildefonso; PR-238 in San Ildefonso
- North end: PR-14 / PR-138 in San Ildefonso

Location
- Country: United States
- Territory: Puerto Rico
- Municipalities: Santa Isabel, Coamo

Highway system
- Roads in Puerto Rico; List
← PR-152	→ PR-154

Puerto Rico Highway 153 (PR-153) is a rural road that goes from Santa Isabel, Puerto Rico, to Coamo. This road extends from PR-1 in downtown Santa Isabel and ends at its junction with PR-14 and PR-138 near downtown Coamo.

Puerto Rico Highway 153 by municipality

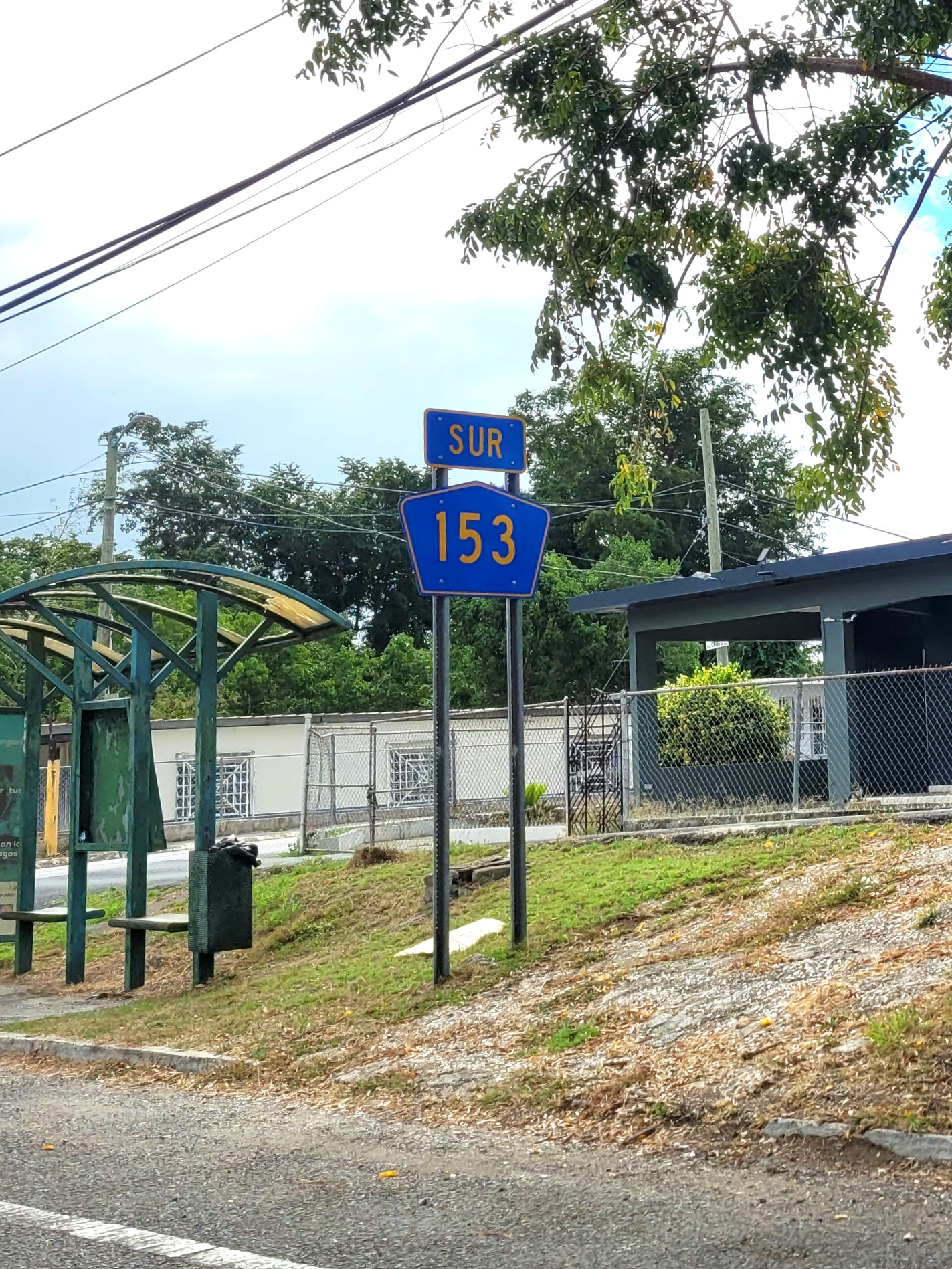
Heading south in Coamo

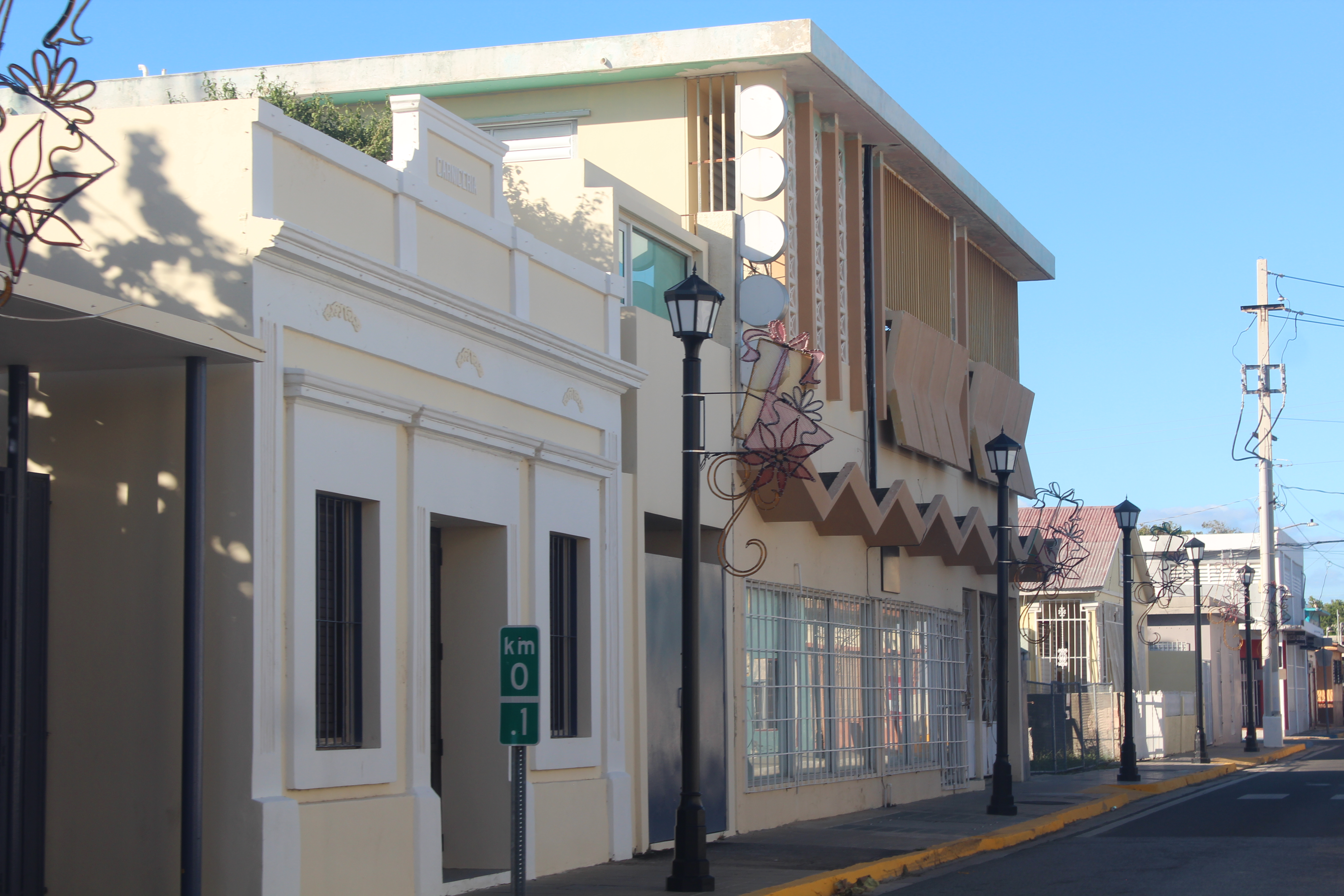
Heading north in Santa Isabel barrio-pueblo

== Major intersections ==
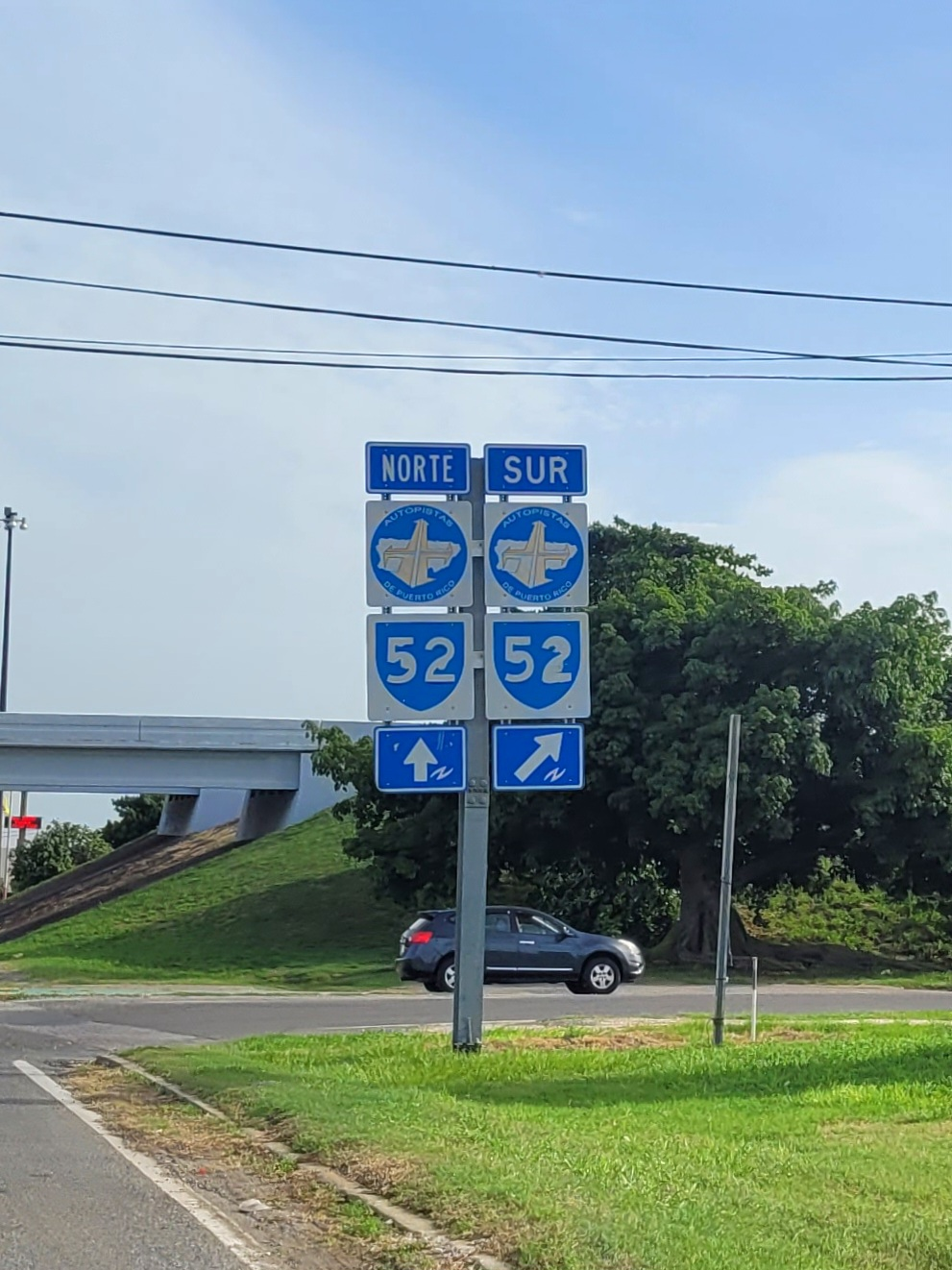
PR-153 south at PR-52 junction in Santa Isabel

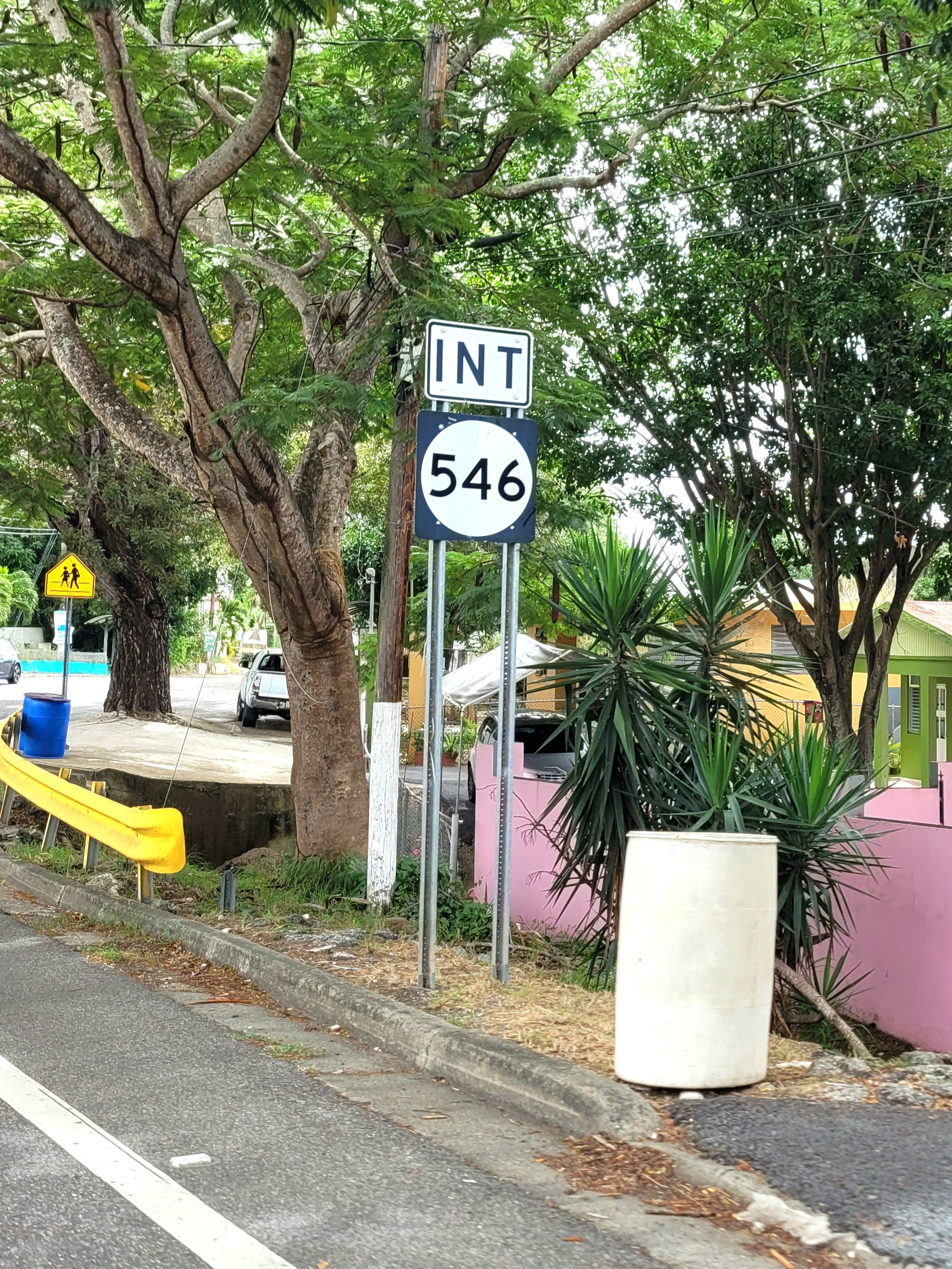
PR-153 south near PR-546 intersection in Coamo

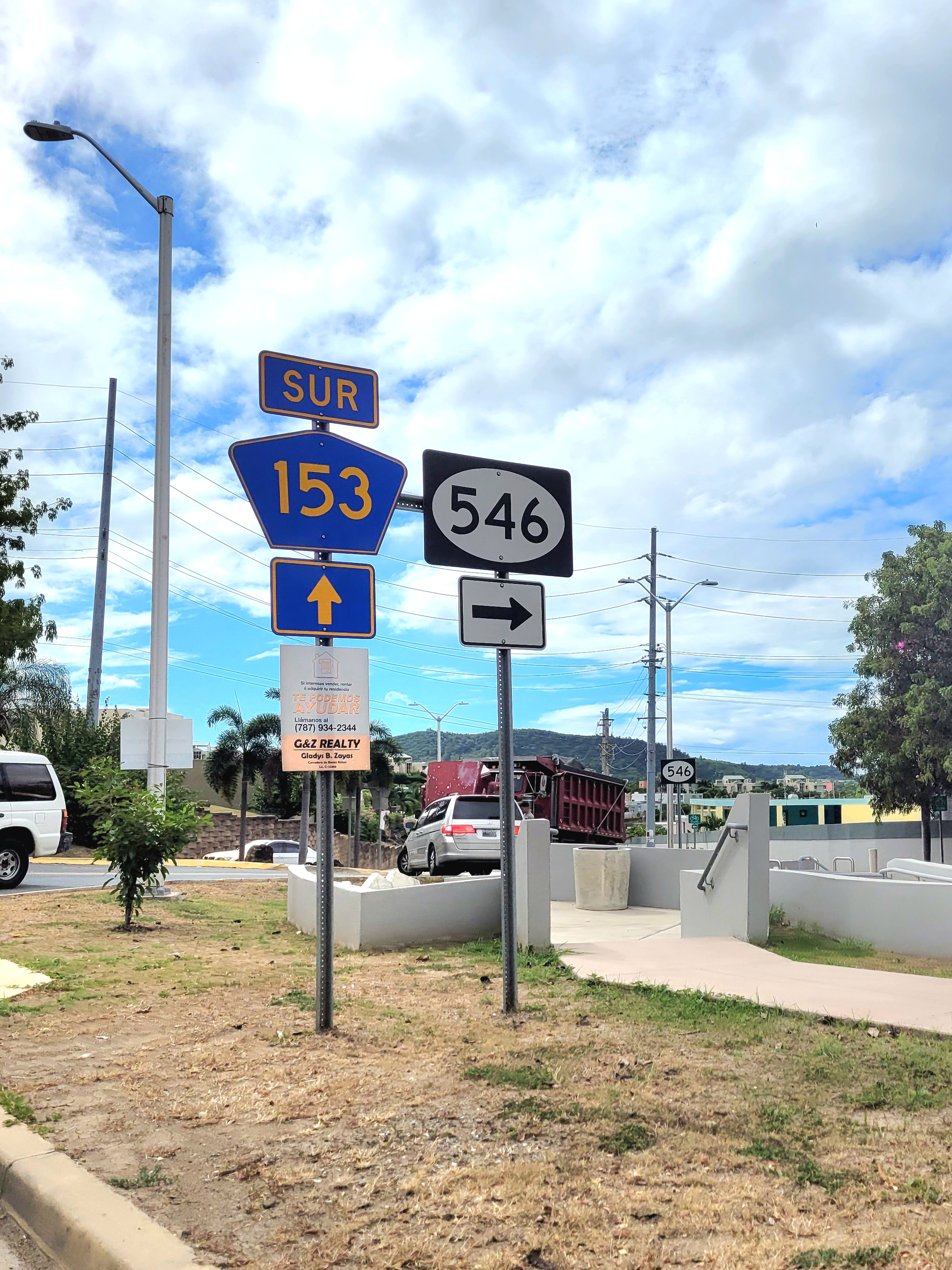
PR-153 south at PR-546 intersection in Coamo

Municipality	Location	km	mi	Destinations	Notes
Santa Isabel	Santa Isabel barrio-pueblo	0.0	0.0	PR-1 (Calle Luis Muñoz Rivera) – Santa Isabel	Southern terminus of PR-153
Santa Isabel	Santa Isabel barrio-pueblo	0.2	0.12	PR-541 (Calle 5 de Octubre) – Santa Isabel	
Santa Isabel	Santa Isabel barrio-pueblo–Boca Velázquez line	1.1– 1.2	0.68– 0.75	PR-161 (Desvío Norte Luis Muñoz Marín) – Ponce, Salinas	
Santa Isabel	Felicia 2	5.9– 6.0	3.7– 3.7	PR-545 – Santa Isabel	Local traffic only
Santa Isabel	Felicia 2	6.6	4.1	PR-542 – Santa Isabel	
Santa Isabel	Felicia 2	6.7– 6.8	4.2– 4.2	PR-52 (Autopista Luis A. Ferré) – San Juan, Ponce	PR-52 exit 76; diamond interchange
Coamo	San Ildefonso	11.1	6.9	PR-154 – Río Jueyes	
Coamo	San Ildefonso	12.1	7.5	PR-546 – Baños de Coamo	
Coamo	San Ildefonso	13.0	8.1	PR-238 east (Desvío Sur de Coamo) – Aibonito	Former PR-138
Coamo	San Ildefonso	14.4	8.9	PR-14 (Bulevar Piel Canela) – Coamo, Juana Díaz	Northern terminus of PR-153 and southern terminus of PR-138; roundabout
Coamo	San Ildefonso	14.4	8.9	PR-138 north (Avenida Luis Muñoz Marín)	Continuation beyond PR-14
1.000 mi = 1.609 km; 1.000 km = 0.621 mi: Closed/former

== See also ==
- 1953 Puerto Rico highway renumbering
