= Palmarejo, Coamo, Puerto Rico =

Barrio of Puerto Rico

Palmarejo
- Barrio
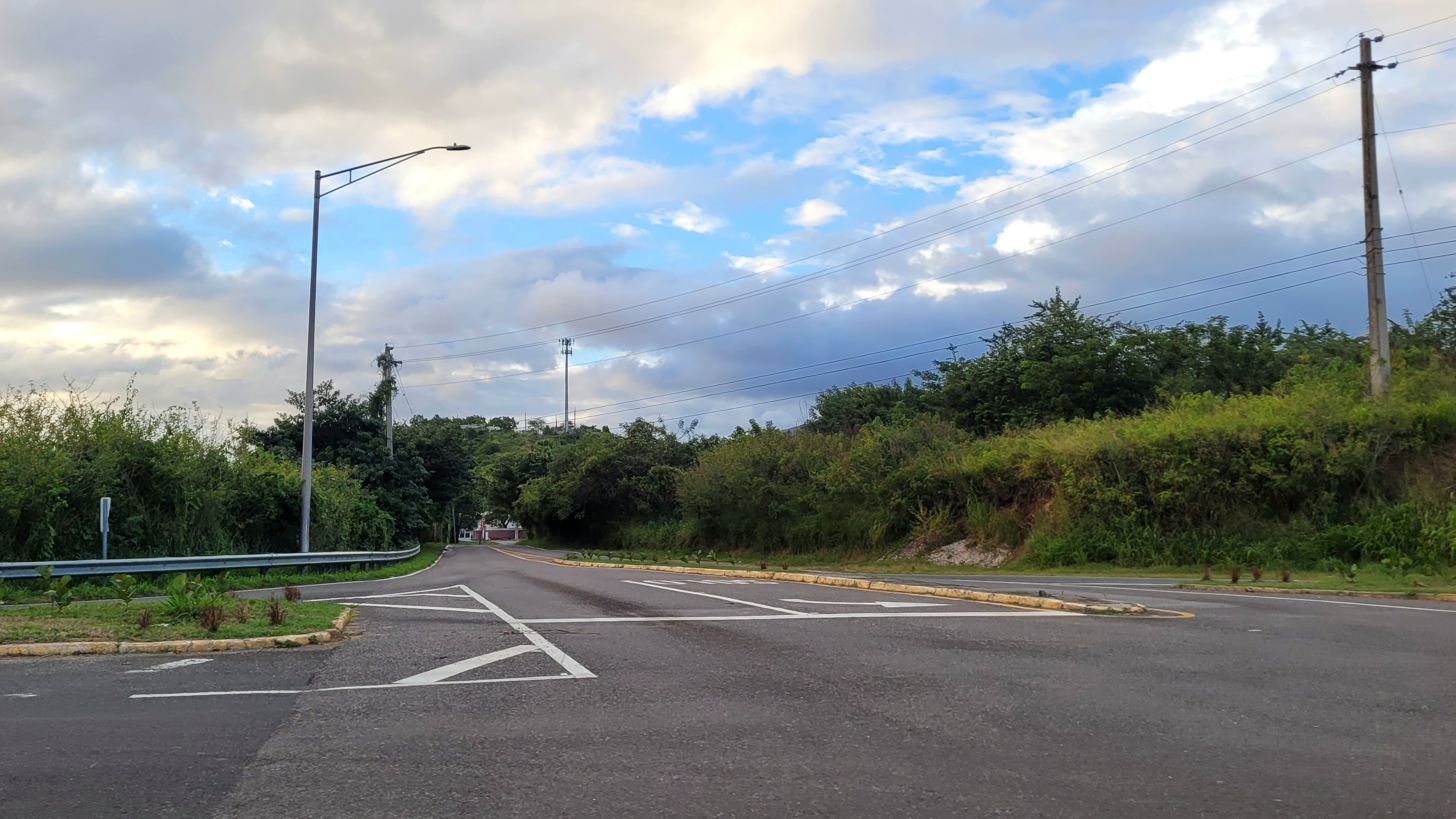
- Puerto Rico Highway 702 in Palmarejo

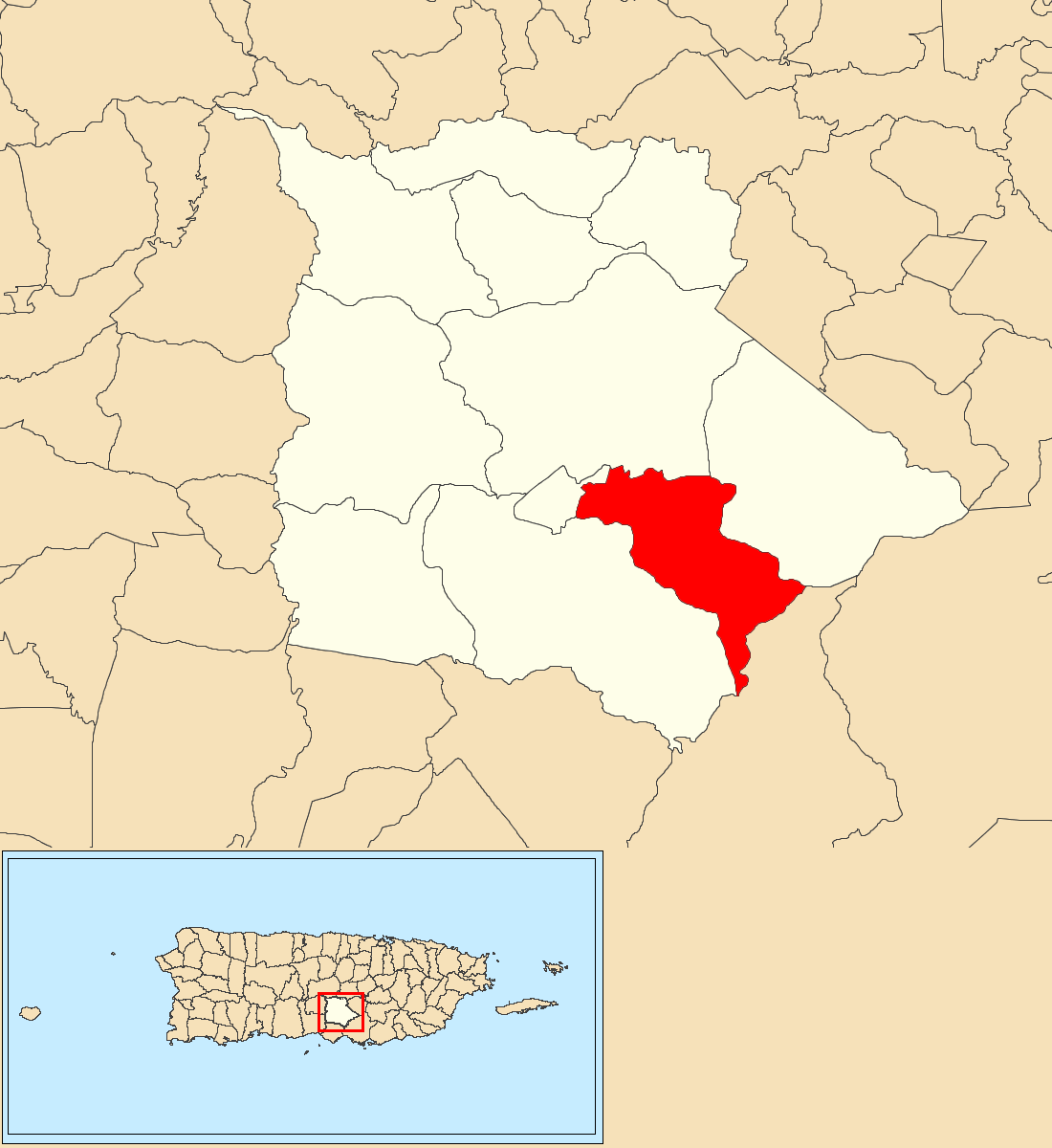
- Location of Palmarejo within the municipality of Coamo shown in red

- Location of Puerto Rico
- Coordinates: 18°03′56″N 66°19′40″W
- Commonwealth: Puerto Rico
- Municipality: Coamo

Area
  - Total: 5.38 sq mi (13.9 km^{2})
  - Land: 5.38 sq mi (13.9 km^{2})
  - Water: 0 sq mi (0 km^{2})
- Elevation: 935 ft (285 m)

Population (2010)
  - Total: 3,650
  - Density: 678.4/sq mi (261.9/km^{2})
- Source: 2010 Census
- Time zone: UTC−4 (AST)
- ZIP Code: 00769
- Area code: 787/939

Palmarejo is a barrio in the municipality of Coamo, Puerto Rico. Its population in 2010 was 3650.

== History ==
Palmarejo was in Spain's gazetteers until Puerto Rico was ceded by Spain in the aftermath of the Spanish–American War under the terms of the Treaty of Paris of 1898 and became an unincorporated territory of the United States. In 1899, the United States Department of War conducted a census of Puerto Rico finding that the combined population of Cuyón barrio and Palmarejo barrio was 1,397.

Historical population
Census	Pop.	Note	%±
1910	1,008		—
1920	981		−2.7%
1930	900		−8.3%
1940	1,042		15.8%
1950	1,317		26.4%
1960	1,721		30.7%
1970	0		−100.0%
1980	4,008		—
1990	4,279		6.8%
2000	4,195		−2.0%
2010	3,650		−13.0%
U.S. Decennial Census; 1900 (N/A) 1910-1930; 1930-1950 1980-2000 2010

== See also ==
- List of communities in Puerto Rico
