= Pasto, Coamo, Puerto Rico =

Barrio of Puerto Rico

Pasto
- Barrio
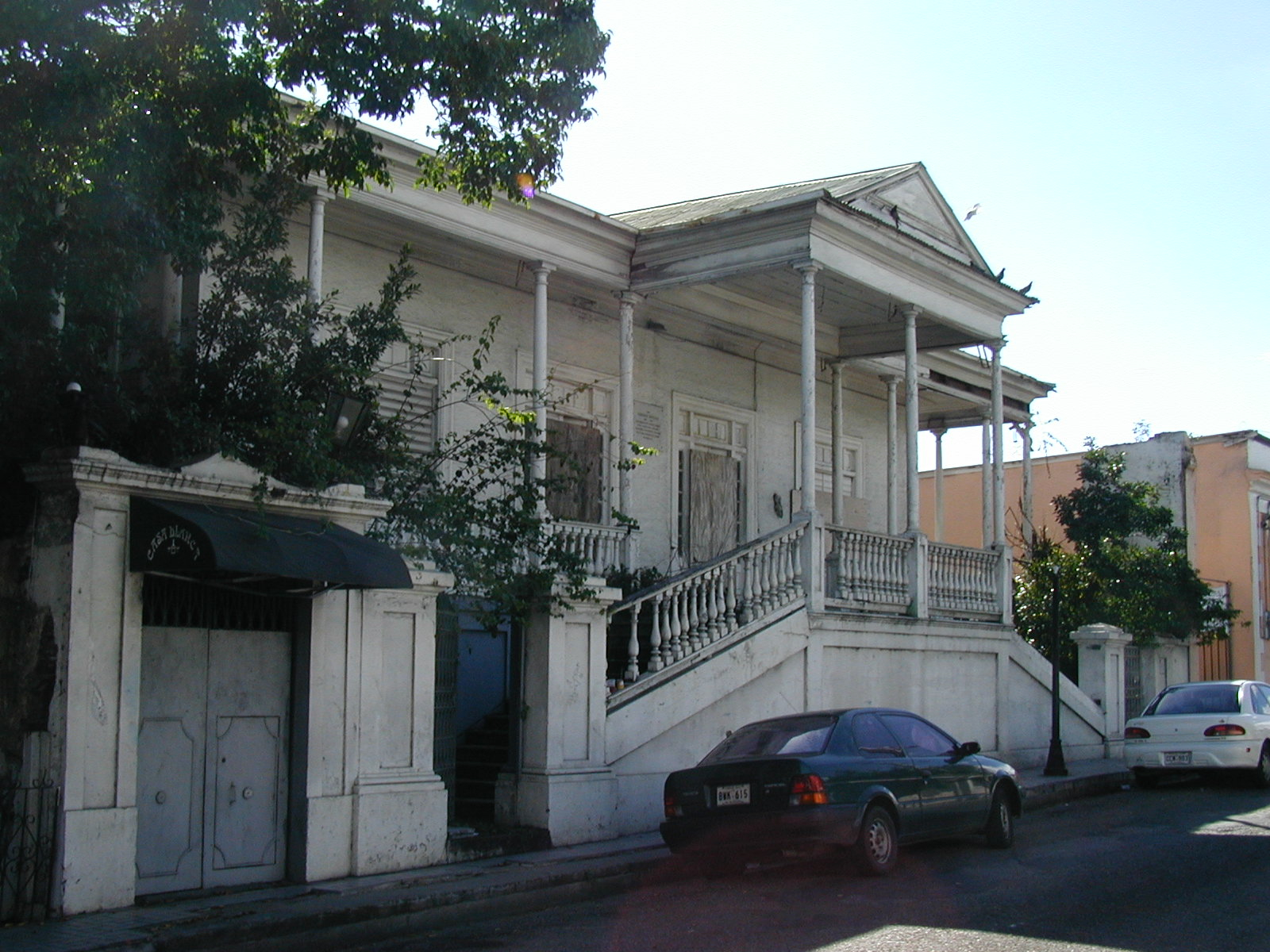
- Historic house in Coamo

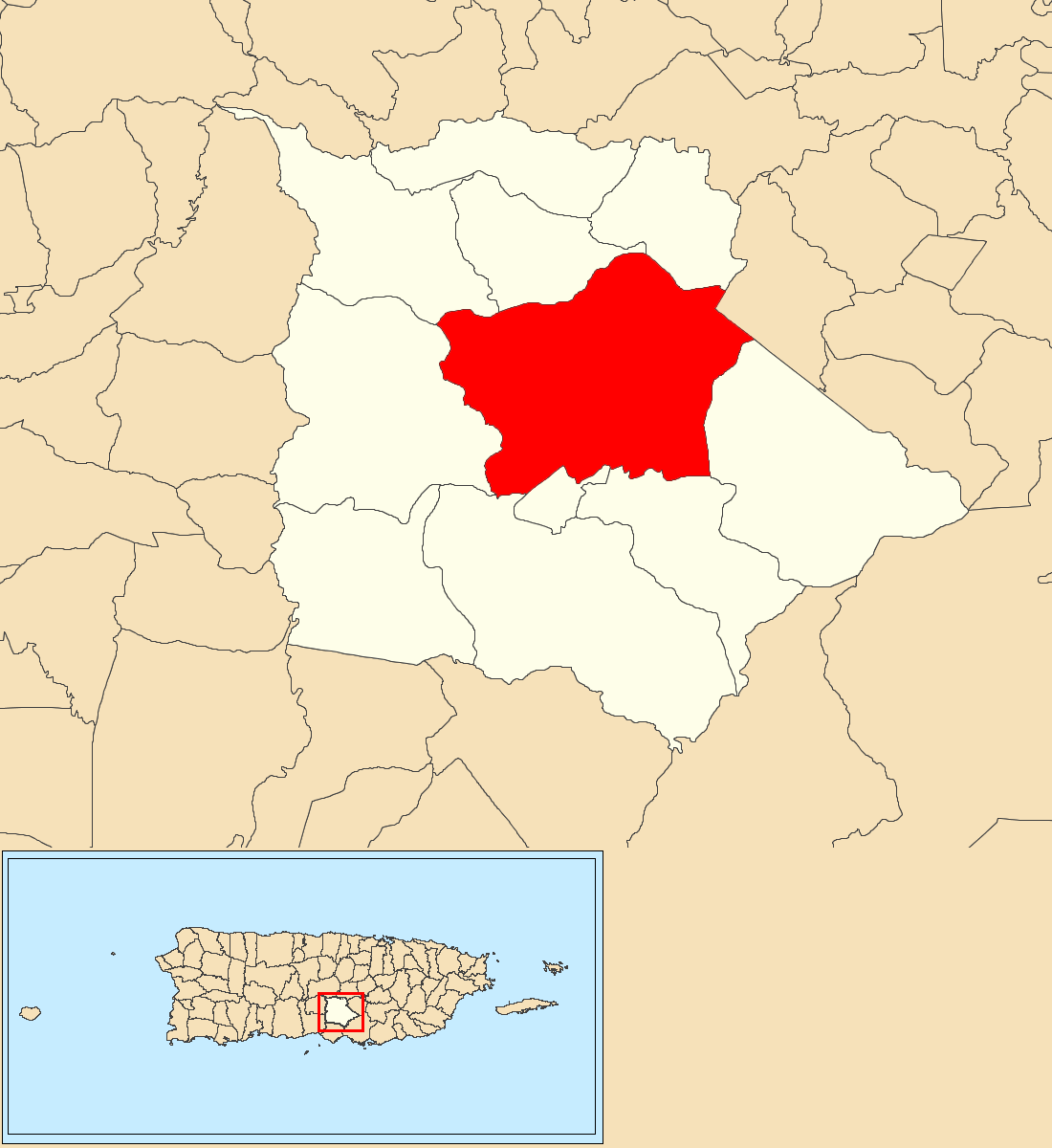
- Location of Pasto within the municipality of Coamo shown in red

- Location of Puerto Rico
- Coordinates: 18°07′14″N 66°20′59″W
- Commonwealth: Puerto Rico
- Municipality: Coamo

Area
  - Total: 13.46 sq mi (34.9 km^{2})
  - Land: 13.46 sq mi (34.9 km^{2})
  - Water: 0 sq mi (0 km^{2})
- Elevation: 781 ft (238 m)

Population (2020)
  - Total: 4,491
- Source: 2020 Census
- Time zone: UTC−4 (AST)
- ZIP Code: 00769
- Area code: 787/939

Pasto is a barrio in the municipality of Coamo, Puerto Rico. Its population in 2020 was 4,491.

== History ==
Pasto was in Spain's gazetteers until Puerto Rico was ceded by Spain in the aftermath of the Spanish–American War under the terms of the Treaty of Paris of 1898 and became an unincorporated territory of the United States. In 1899, the United States Department of War conducted a census of Puerto Rico finding that the population of Pasto barrio was 1,272.

Historical population
Census	Pop.	Note	%±
1900	1,272		—
1910	1,701		33.7%
1920	1,533		−9.9%
1930	1,663		8.5%
1940	1,742		4.8%
1950	2,104		20.8%
1960	2,519		19.7%
1970	2,933		16.4%
1980	2,652		−9.6%
1990	4,385		65.3%
2000	5,420		23.6%
2010	5,540		2.2%
2020	4,491		−18.9%
U.S. Decennial Census; 1899 (shown as 1900) 1910-1930; 1930-1950 1980-2000 2010 2020

== Florencio Santiago ==
Florencio Santiago, born in 1855, was from Pasto. He was a philanthropist who studied at Boston University and donated most of his patrimony, which was used for the building of many structures in Coamo, including the central plaza in Coamo barrio-pueblo. A street and a school in Coamo are named after him.

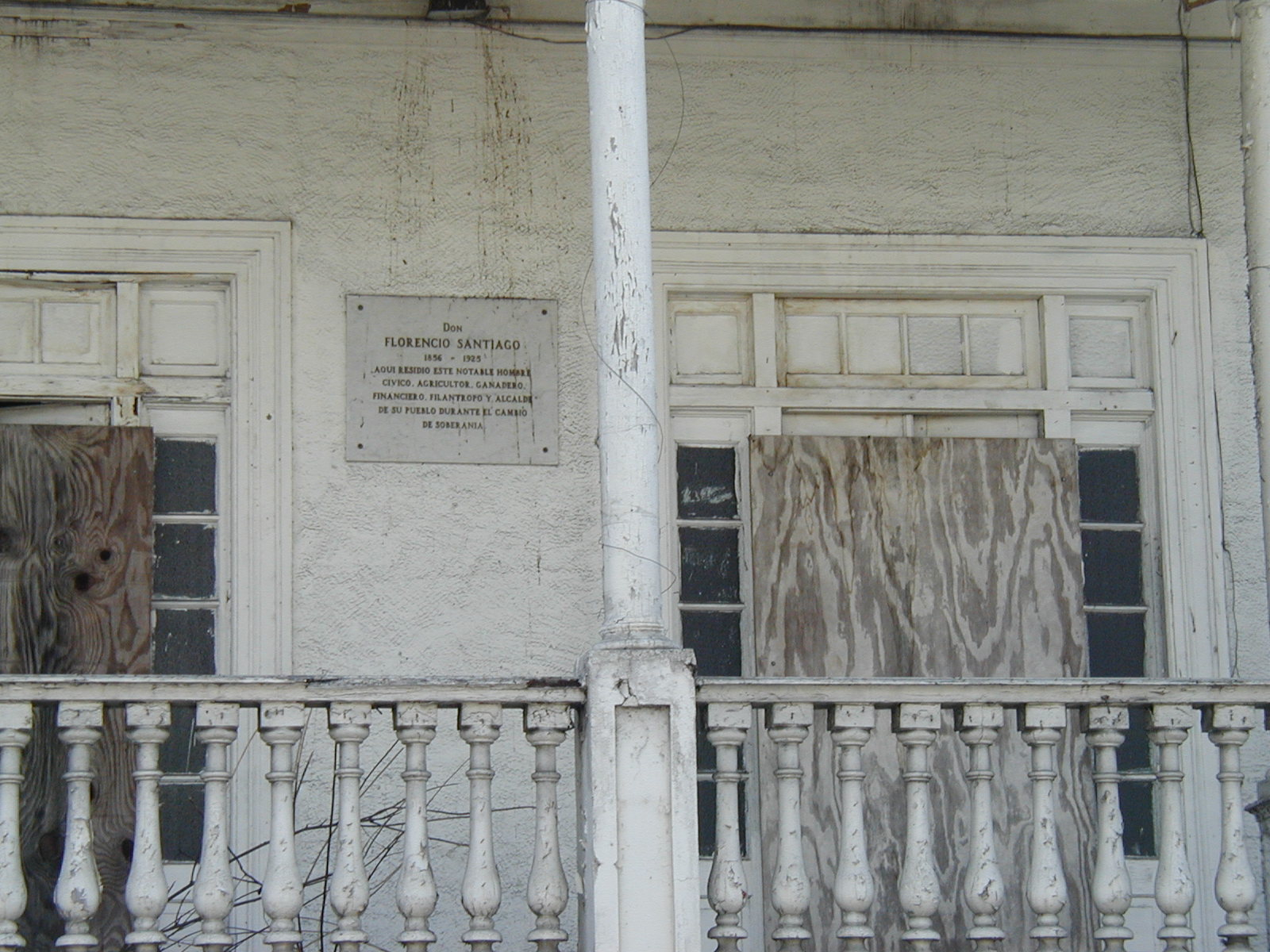
Sign on Florencio Santiago residence

== See also ==
- List of communities in Puerto Rico
