= San Ildefonso, Coamo, Puerto Rico =

Barrio of Puerto Rico

San Ildefonso
- Barrio
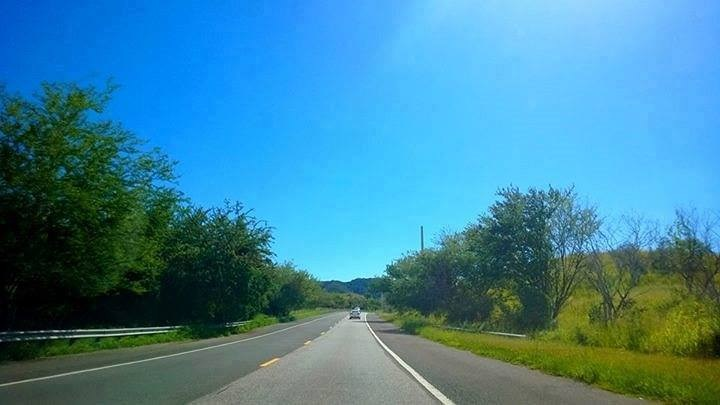
- Puerto Rico Highway 238 in San Ildefonso

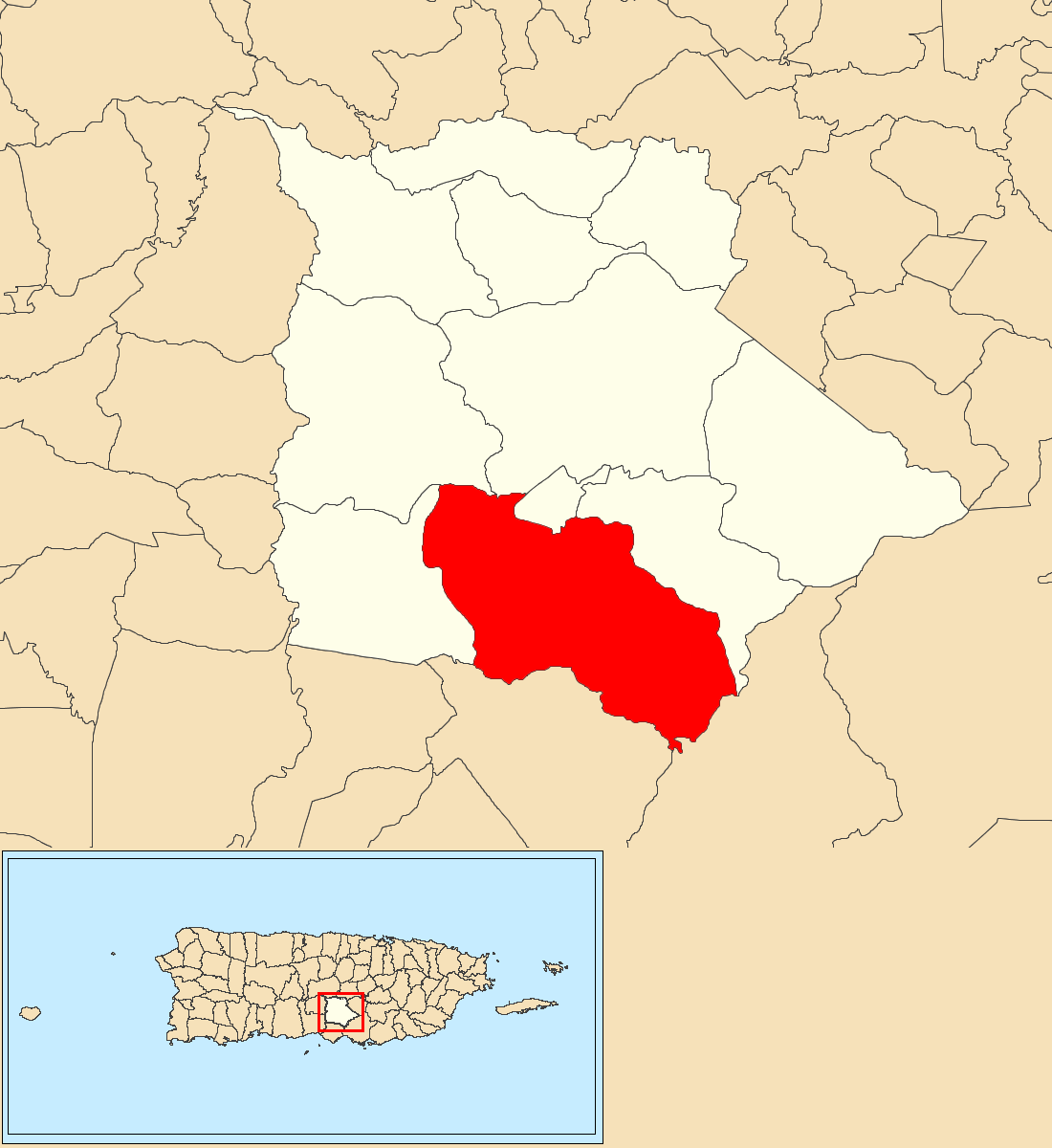
- Location of San Ildefonso within the municipality of Coamo shown in red

- Location of Puerto Rico
- Coordinates: 18°02′31″N 66°21′05″W
- Commonwealth: Puerto Rico
- Municipality: Coamo

Area
  - Total: 12.41 sq mi (32.1 km^{2})
  - Land: 12.40 sq mi (32.1 km^{2})
  - Water: 0.01 sq mi (0.026 km^{2})
- Elevation: 463 ft (141 m)

Population (2010)
  - Total: 11,427
  - Density: 921.5/sq mi (355.8/km^{2})
- Source: 2010 Census
- Time zone: UTC−4 (AST)
- ZIP Code: 00769
- Area code: 787/939

San Ildefonso is a barrio in the municipality of Coamo, Puerto Rico. Its population in 2010 was 11,427.

== History ==
San Ildefonso was in Spain's gazetteers until Puerto Rico was ceded by Spain in the aftermath of the Spanish–American War under the terms of the Treaty of Paris of 1898 and became an unincorporated territory of the United States. In 1899, the United States Department of War conducted a census of Puerto Rico finding that the population of San Ildefonso barrio was 1,252.

Historical population
Census	Pop.	Note	%±
1900	1,252		—
1910	1,568		25.2%
1920	1,458		−7.0%
1930	1,312		−10.0%
1940	1,723		31.3%
1950	2,062		19.7%
1960	2,009		−2.6%
1970	2,838		41.3%
1980	5,012		76.6%
1990	6,742		34.5%
2000	9,288		37.8%
2010	11,427		23.0%
U.S. Decennial Census; 1899 (shown as 1900) 1910-1930; 1930-1950 1980-2000 2010

== See also ==
- List of communities in Puerto Rico
