= Puerto Rico Highway 149 =

Highway in Puerto Rico

Highway 149
- Ruta 149

Route information
- Maintained by Puerto Rico DTPW
- Length: 72.9 km (45.3 mi)
- Existed: 1953–present

Major junctions
- South end: PR-1 in Capitanejo–Cintrona
- PR-52 in Amuelas; PR-14 in Juana Díaz barrio-pueblo–Lomas; PR-149R in Villalba Arriba; PR-143 in Villalba Arriba–Ala de la Piedra; PR-144 in Toro Negro; PR-157 in Toro Negro; PR-533 in Cialitos–Toro Negro; PR-649 in Ciales barrio-pueblo; PR-145 / PR-146 in Jaguas; PR-2 in Coto Norte
- North end: PR-22 in Coto Norte

Location
- Country: United States
- Territory: Puerto Rico
- Municipalities: Juana Díaz, Villalba, Orocovis, Ciales, Manatí

Highway system
- Roads in Puerto Rico; List
← PR-148	→ PR-150
← PR-139R	PR-149R	→ PR-152R

Puerto Rico Highway 149 (PR-149) is a secondary highway in Puerto Rico that connects the towns of Manatí in the north coast of Puerto Rico to Juana Díaz in the south coast. The road begins at PR-22 and ends at PR-1, passing through Ciales, Orocovis and Villalba municipalities in the Cordillera Central.

== Route description ==
After Manatí, PR-149 goes through Ciales, and is a divided highway and a wide rural highway between that municipality and Manatí, as it is also from Juana Díaz to Villalba. From Ciales to Villalba, it is an extremely dangerous mountain road, with very high areas and poor safety barriers. From Ciales to Villalba it passes through the Salto de Doña Juana, a spot with a small waterfall and a small creek where people can jump and swim. It is one of the longest highways going south to north, perhaps the longest excluding PR-1 and PR-52.

The highway also makes intersections with PR-2 just 2 kilometers south from its beginning in PR-22, and an intersection with PR-52 about 8 kilometers north from the terminus at PR-1.

Puerto Rico Highway 149

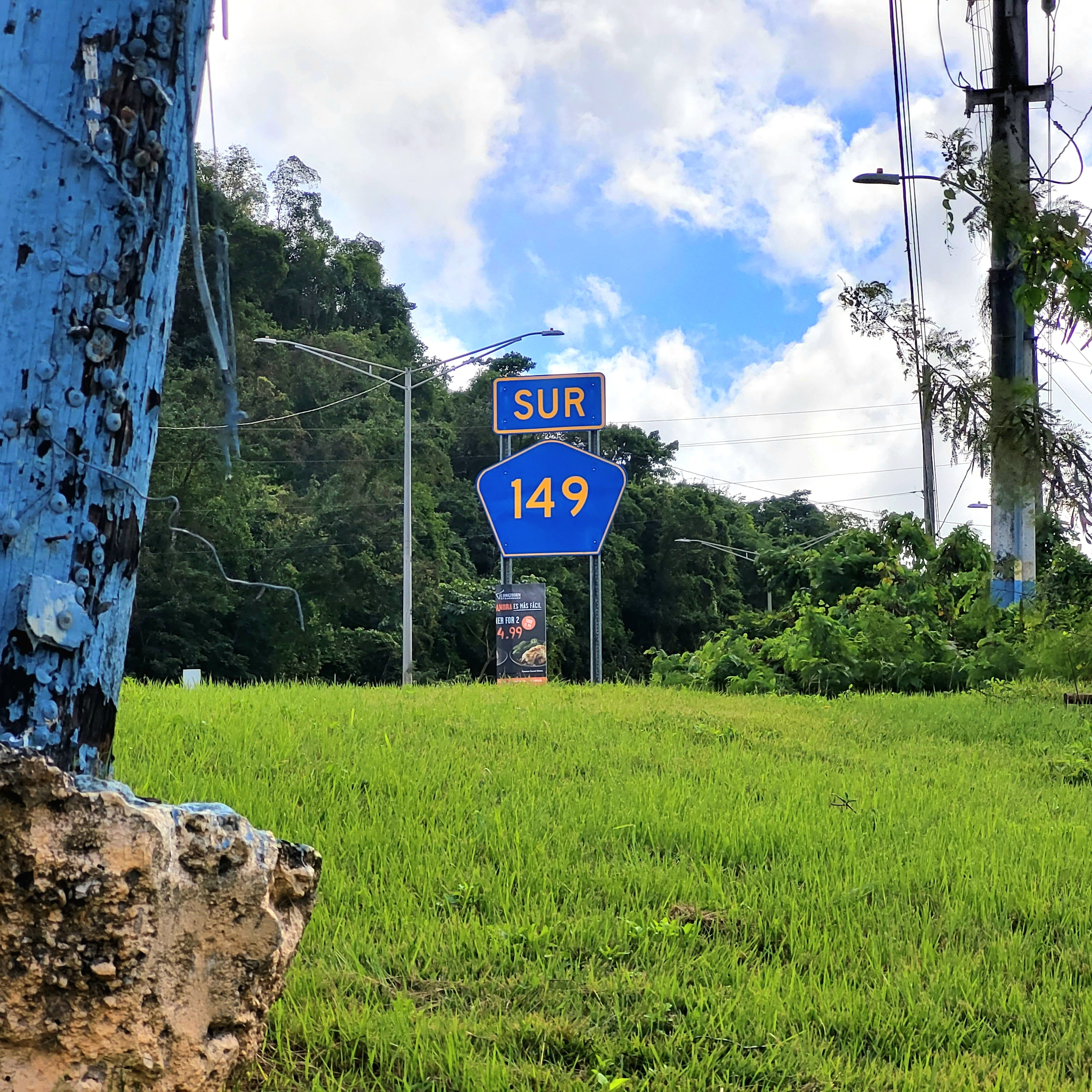
Southbound sign in Coto Norte, Manatí

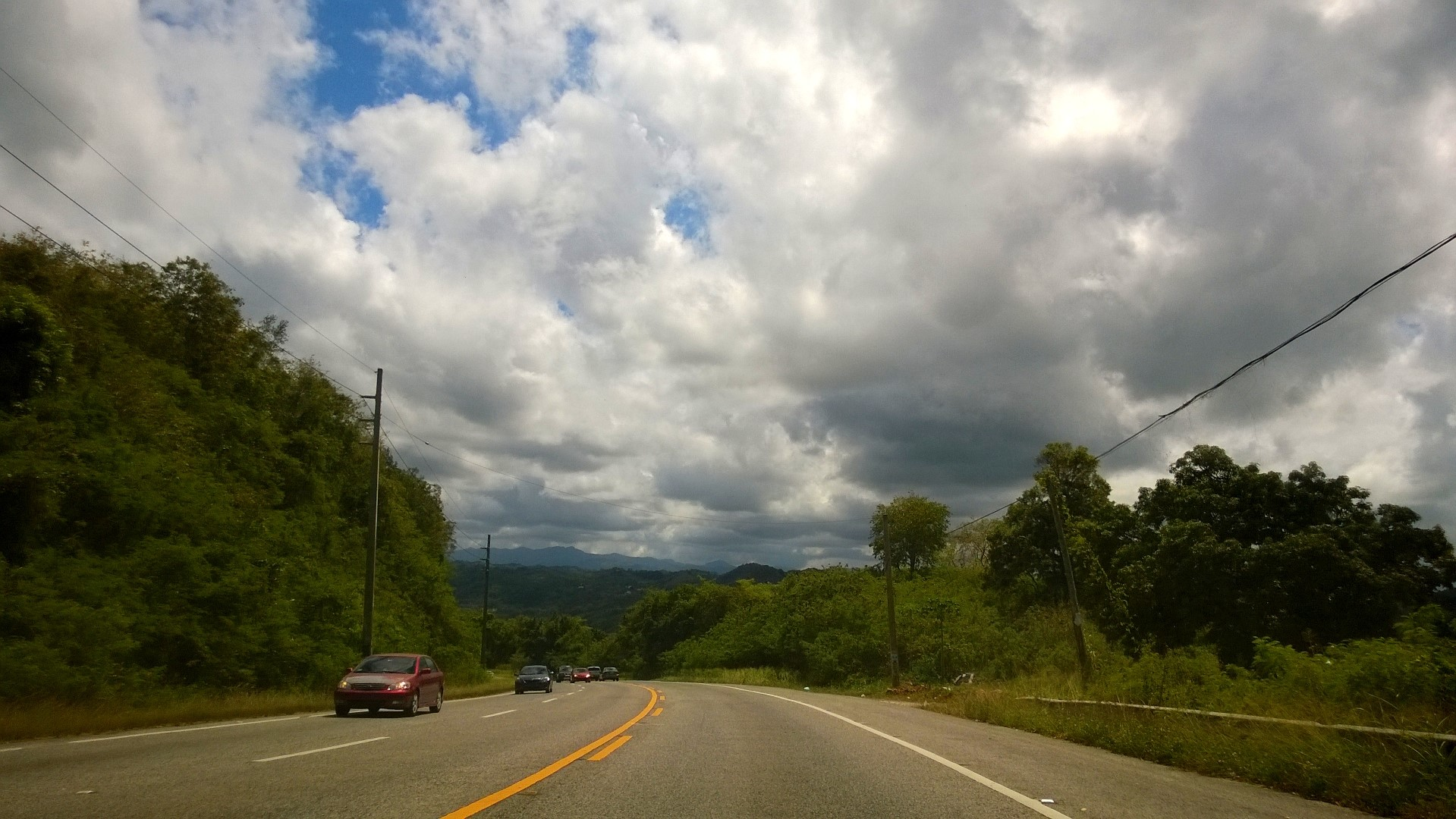
Heading south in Coto Sur, Manatí

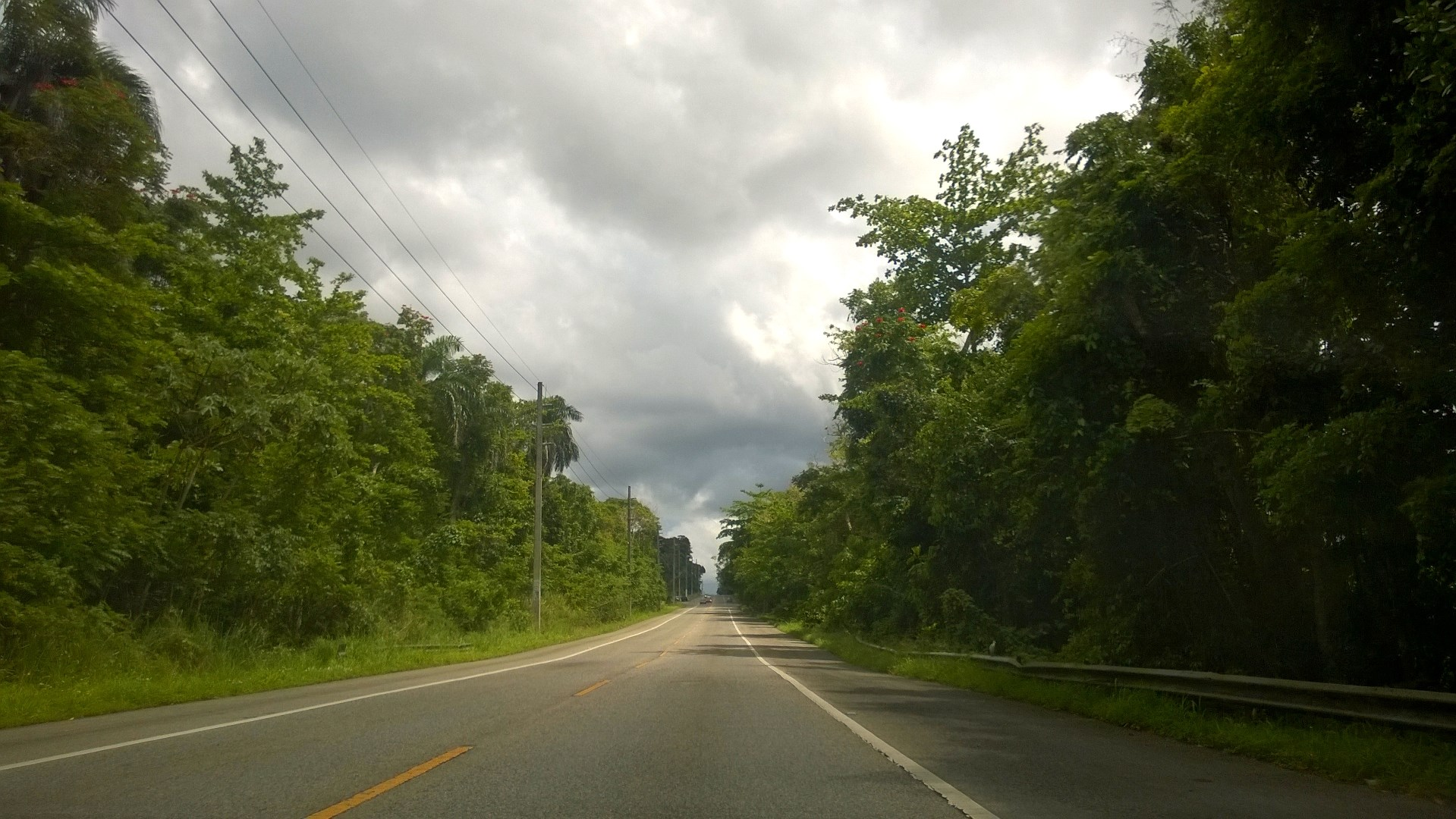
Heading south in Río Arriba Saliente, Manatí

== Major intersections ==
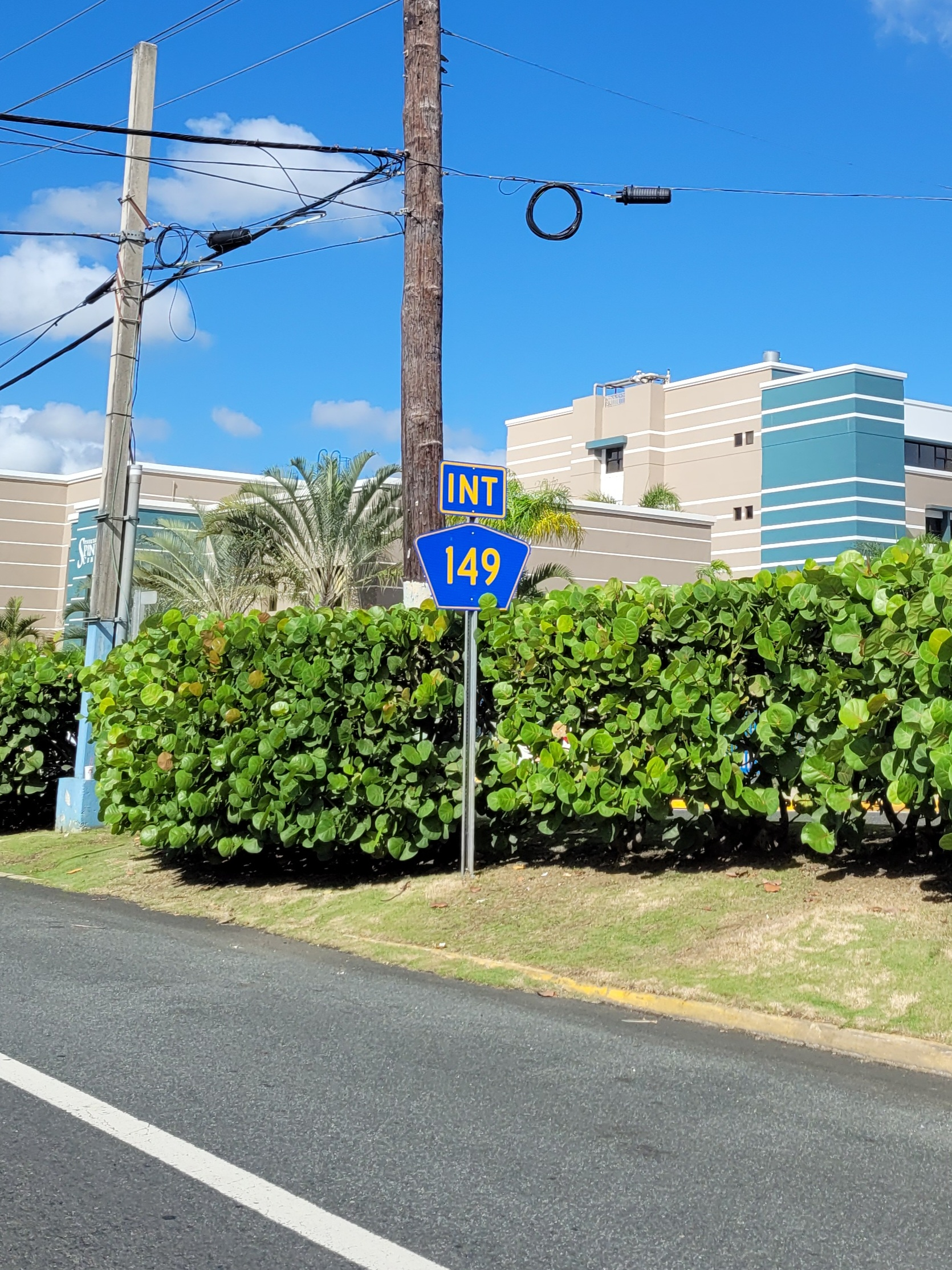
PR-2 west near its junction with PR-149 in Coto Norte, Manatí

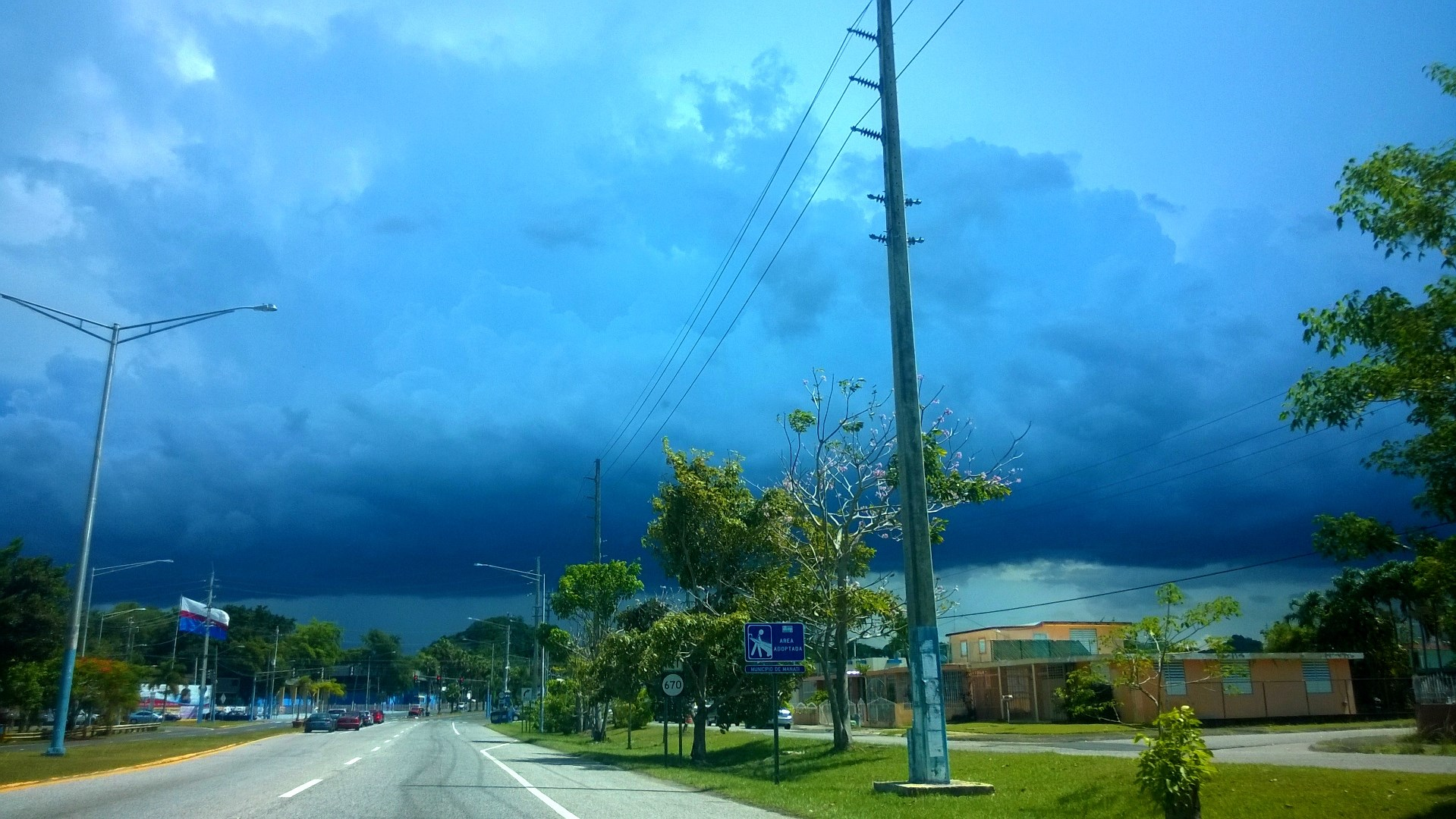
PR-149 south approaching PR-670 in Coto Norte, Manatí

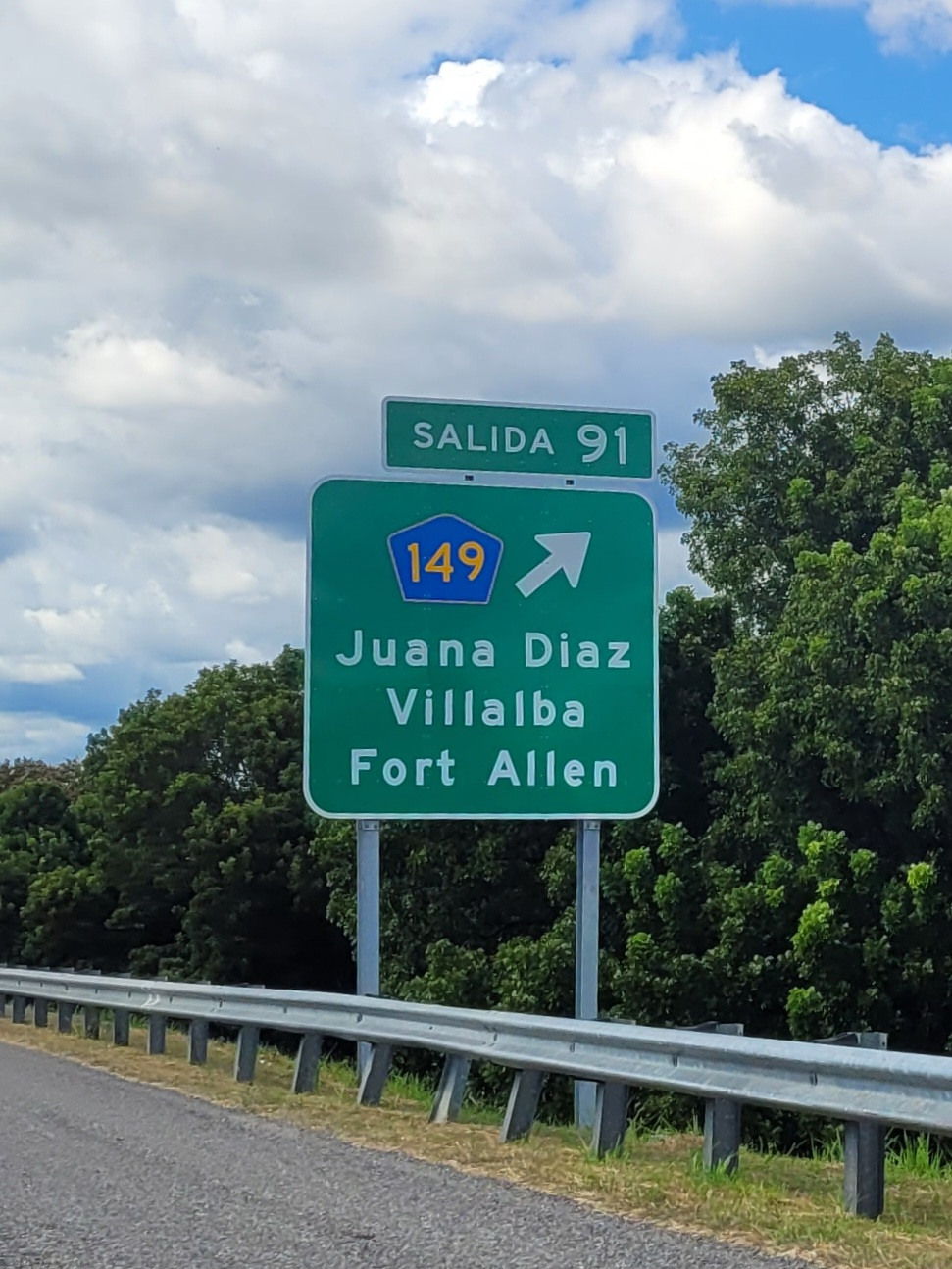
PR-52 south at exit 91 to PR-149 in Amuelas, Juana Díaz

Municipality	Location	km	mi	Destinations	Notes
Juana Díaz	Capitanejo–Cintrona line	72.9	45.3	PR-1 – Ponce, Santa Isabel	Southern terminus of PR-149
Juana Díaz	Amuelas	68.5	42.6	PR-510 – Amuelas	Southern terminus of PR-510 concurrency
Juana Díaz	Amuelas	68.3	42.4	PR-510 – Sabana Llana	Northern terminus of PR-510 concurrency
Juana Díaz	Amuelas	67.8	42.1	PR-592 (Calle Luis Muñoz Rivera) – Juana Díaz	
Juana Díaz	Amuelas	66.9	41.6	PR-52 (Autopista Luis A. Ferré) – Ponce, San Juan	PR-52 exit 91; partial cloverleaf interchange
Juana Díaz	Juana Díaz barrio-pueblo	66.8	41.5	PR-584 (Desvío Víctor Cruz) – Juana Díaz	
Juana Díaz	Juana Díaz barrio-pueblo–Lomas line	65.9	40.9	PR-14 (Carretera Central) – Juana Díaz, Ponce	
Juana Díaz	Lomas	65.2– 65.1	40.5– 40.5	PR-570 (Calle Carrión Maduro) – Juana Díaz	Southern terminus of PR-570 concurrency
Juana Díaz	Lomas	65.0	40.4	PR-519 – Lomas	
Juana Díaz	Lomas	64.9	40.3	PR-570 – Lomas	Northern terminus of PR-570 concurrency
Juana Díaz	Guayabal	63.3	39.3	PR-570 – Lomas	
Juana Díaz	Guayabal	62.7	39.0	PR-5550 – Guayabal	Northbound exit and entrance
Juana Díaz	Guayabal	62.5	38.8	PR-5550 – Guayabal	Southern terminus of PR-5550 concurrency
Juana Díaz	Guayabal	62.4	38.8	PR-552 – Guayabal	
Juana Díaz	Guayabal	62.3	38.7	PR-5550 – Guayabal	Northern terminus of PR-5550 concurrency
Juana Díaz	Guayabal	62.2– 62.1	38.6– 38.6	PR-5550 – Guayabal	
Juana Díaz	Guayabal	61.8	38.4	PR-557 – Guayabal	
Villalba	Villalba Abajo	61.3	38.1	PR-583 – Villalba Abajo	
Villalba	Villalba Abajo	61.0	37.9	PR-550 – Villalba Abajo	
Villalba	Villalba Abajo	59.9	37.2	PR-550 – Villalba Abajo	Southern terminus of PR-550 concurrency
Villalba	Villalba Abajo	59.5	37.0	PR-550 – Villalba Abajo	Northern terminus of PR-550 concurrency
Villalba	Villalba Abajo	59.1	36.7	PR-550 – Villalba Abajo	Southern terminus of PR-550 concurrency
Villalba	Villalba Abajo	59.1– 59.0	36.7– 36.7	PR-550 / PR-5513 – Villalba Abajo	Northern terminus of PR-550 concurrency
Villalba	Villalba Abajo	58.1	36.1	PR-5561 (Carretera Gregorio Durán Vélez) – Coamo, Orocovis	
Villalba	Villalba Abajo	57.9	36.0	PR-513 – Collores	
Villalba	Villalba Arriba	57.7	35.9	PR-514 – Villalba Arriba	
Villalba	Villalba Arriba	56.5	35.1	PR-589 – Villalba Arriba	
Villalba	Villalba Arriba	55.8	34.7	PR-149R north (Calle Walter McJones) – Villalba	
Villalba	Villalba barrio-pueblo	55.1	34.2	PR-149R (Calle Luis Muñoz Rivera) – Villalba	
Villalba	Villalba Arriba	50.7	31.5	PR-5514 – Villalba Arriba	
Villalba–Orocovis municipal line	Villalba Arriba–Ala de la Piedra line	45.4	28.2	PR-143 west (Ruta Panorámica) – Adjuntas	Southern terminus of PR-143 concurrency; the Ruta Panorámica continues toward Juana Díaz
Orocovis	Ala de la Piedra	44.8	27.8	PR-143 east (Ruta Panorámica) – Barranquitas	Northern terminus of PR-143 concurrency; the Ruta Panorámica continues toward Villalba
Río Toro Negro		41.0	25.5	Puente Ala de la Piedra	
Ciales	Toro Negro	40.8– 40.7	25.4– 25.3	PR-144 – Jayuya	
Ciales	Toro Negro	37.0– 36.9	23.0– 22.9	PR-157 east – Orocovis	
Ciales	Cialitos–Toro Negro line	34.6	21.5	PR-533 west – Jayuya	
Ciales	Cialitos–Toro Negro line	33.8	21.0	PR-608 – Cialitos	
Ciales	Cialitos–Toro Negro line	26.1	16.2	PR-615 – Pozas	
Ciales	Cialitos–Toro Negro line	24.9	15.5	PR-614 (Vereda Las Cruces) – Cialitos	
Ciales	Pesas	19.1	11.9	PR-615 – Pozas	
Ciales	Jaguas	14.3	8.9	PR-6632 north – Morovis	
Ciales	Ciales barrio-pueblo	13.7	8.5	PR-649 west (Calle Ramón Emeterio Betances) – Utuado	One-way street
Ciales	Jaguas	12.9	8.0	PR-145 east (Carretera Juan "Pachín" Vicéns) / PR-146 west – Morovis, Utuado	
Ciales	Hato Viejo	10.6	6.6	PR-633 – Morovis	
Ciales	Hato Viejo	10.2	6.3	PR-6633 west – Florida	
Manatí	Río Arriba Saliente	8.0	5.0	PR-643 – Florida, Pugnado Adentro	
Manatí	Coto Sur	3.1	1.9	PR-6668 – Manatí	Former PR-668
Manatí	Coto Sur	2.5	1.6	PR-6668 – Manatí	
Manatí	Coto Sur–Coto Norte line	2.0– 1.9	1.2– 1.2	PR-670 – Manatí, Vega Baja	
Manatí	Coto Norte	1.0	0.62	PR-2 (Bulevar Antonio Vélez Alvarado) – Arecibo, San Juan	
Manatí	Coto Norte	0.0	0.0	PR-22 (Autopista José de Diego) – San Juan, Morovis, Arecibo, Mayagüez	Northern terminus of PR-149; PR-22 exit 48; trumpet interchange
1.000 mi = 1.609 km; 1.000 km = 0.621 mi: Concurrency terminus; Incomplete access

== Related route ==
Highway 149R
- Location: Villalba
- Length: 1.1 km (0.68 mi)

Puerto Rico Highway 149R (Spanish: Carretera Ramal 149, abbreviated Ramal PR-149 or PR-149R) is a business loop road that branches off from PR-149 and leads into downtown Villalba, Puerto Rico. This road used to be signed PR-149, but became 149R when a new road bypassing the downtown area was built around the town center. The entire route is located in Villalba.

Location	km	mi	Destinations	Notes
Villalba Arriba	1.1	0.68	PR-149 (Desvío Félix L. Hernández Morales) – Juana Díaz	Southern terminus of PR-149R
Villalba barrio-pueblo	0.6	0.37	PR-150 east (Calle Walter McJones) to PR-151 north – Coamo, Orocovis	
Villalba barrio-pueblo	0.1	0.062	PR-547 (Carretera Aceituna) – Villa Alba	
Villalba barrio-pueblo	0.0	0.0	PR-149 – Ciales	Northern terminus of PR-149R
1.000 mi = 1.609 km; 1.000 km = 0.621 mi

== See also ==
- 1953 Puerto Rico highway renumbering
