= Cañas River (Juana Díaz, Puerto Rico) =

River of Puerto Rico

Coordinates: 17.9874650°N 66.4796159°W

Location
- Commonwealth: Puerto Rico
- Municipality: Juana Díaz

Physical characteristics
- Source
  - location: Cerro de las Cuevas in Guayabal, Juana Díaz
  - elevation: 1,246 ft.
- Mouth
  - location: Punta Pastillo in Capitanejo, Juana Díaz
  - elevation: 0 ft.

The Cañas River (Spanish: Río Cañas) is a river of Puerto Rico. The barrios Río Cañas Abajo and Río Cañas Arriba in Juana Díaz are named after the river. Its headwaters are located in the Cerro de las Cuevas area of the Guayabal barrio of Juana Díaz, and it flows from north to south before reaching its delta at Punta Pastillo, immediately east of the Potala Pastillo poblado of the barrio Capitanejo of the same municipality.

== See also ==
- List of rivers of Puerto Rico
