= Capitanejo =

Capitanejo may refer to:

- Capitanejo, Juana Díaz, Puerto Rico, a barrio
- Capitanejo, Ponce, Puerto Rico, a barrio
- Capitanejo, Santander, a municipality in Santander, Colombia
- Capitanejo,(Argentina), Specially south of Argentina, an indigene commanding a small group of tribe members
