= Cintrona =

Barrio of Juana Díaz, Puerto Rico

- Barrio
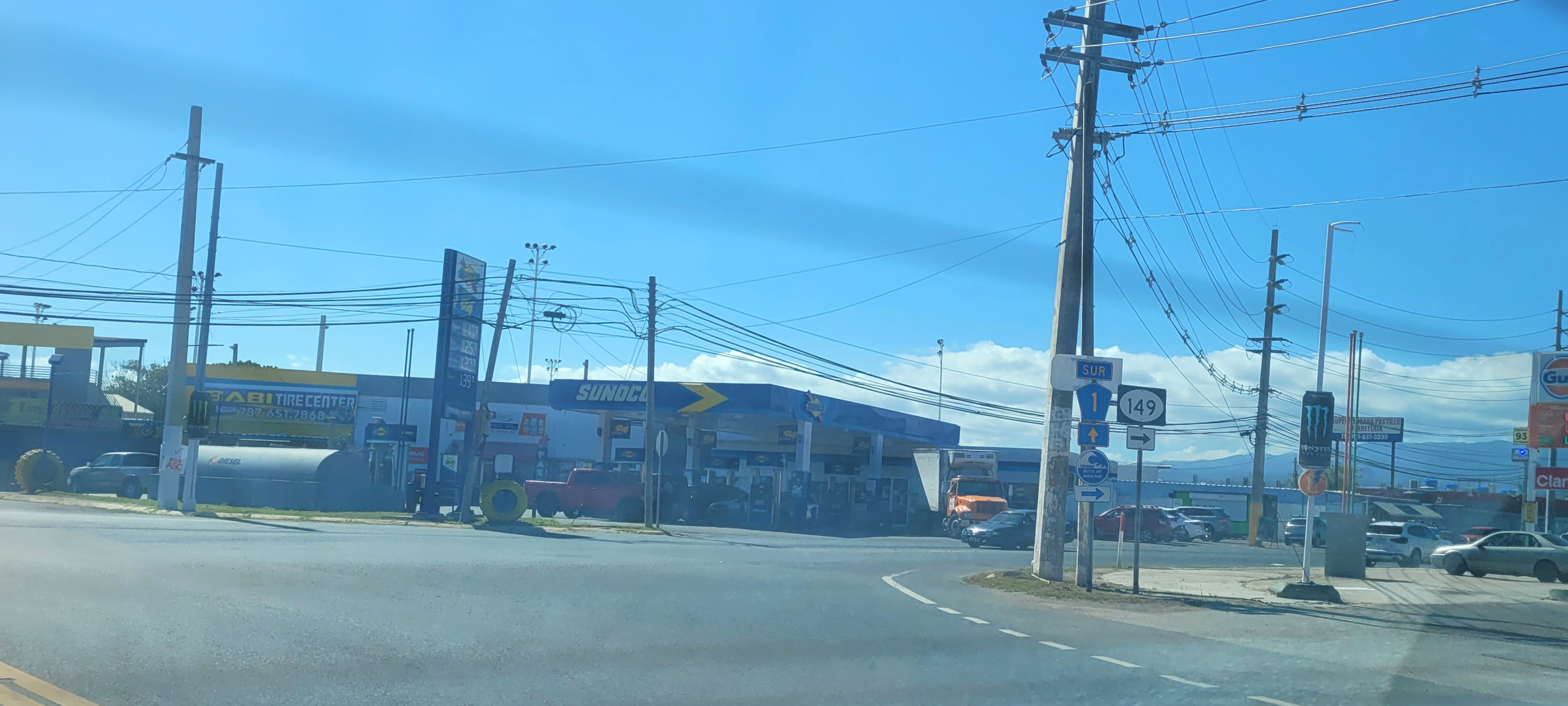
- Puerto Rico Highway 1 and Puerto Rico Highway 149 intersection between Capitanejo and Cintrona

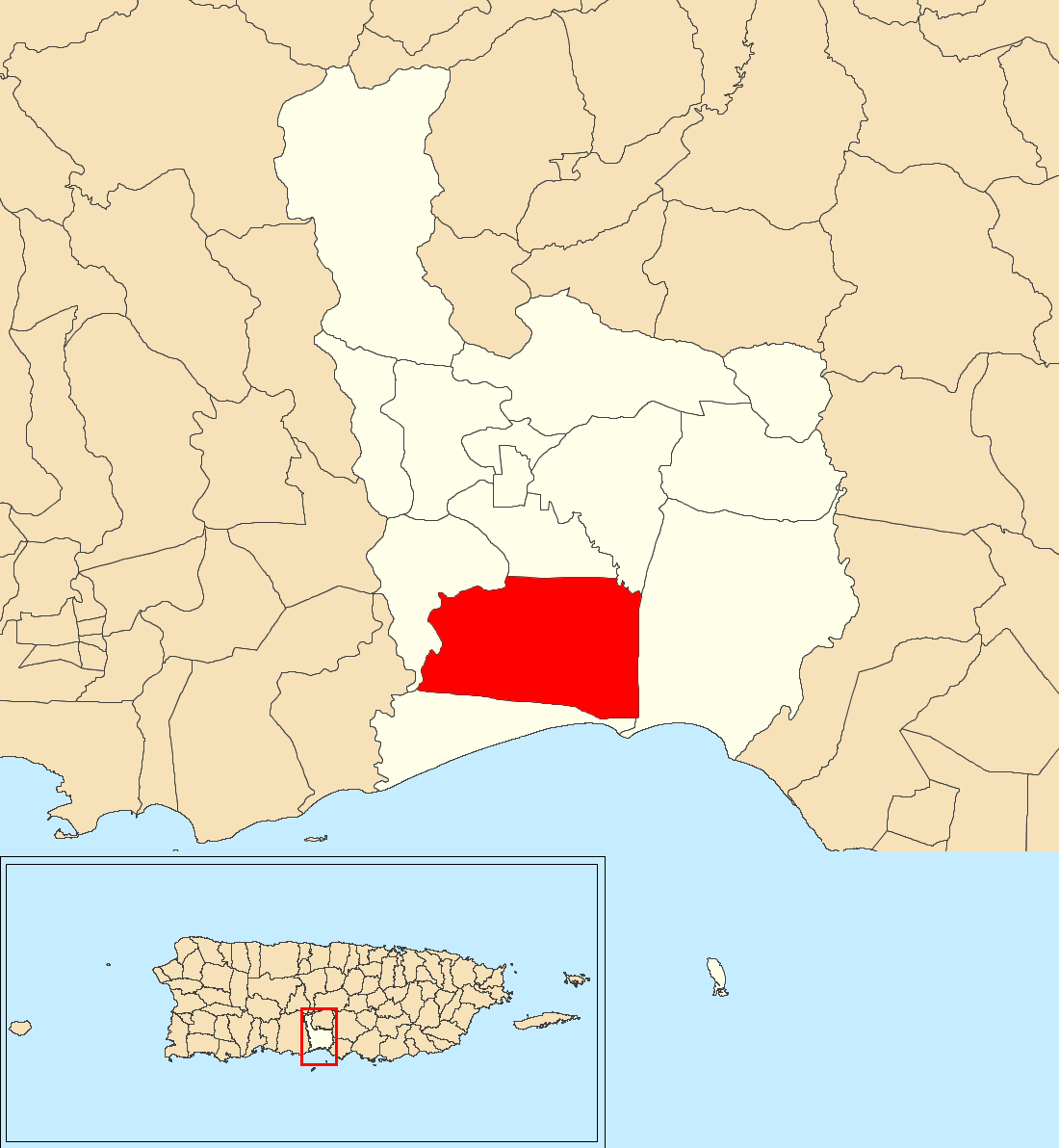
- Location of Cintrona within the municipality of Juana Díaz shown in red

- Location of Puerto Rico
- Coordinates: 18°00′41″N 66°30′08″W
- Commonwealth: Puerto Rico
- Municipality: Juana Díaz

Area
  - Total: 6.90 sq mi (17.9 km^{2})
  - Land: 6.88 sq mi (17.8 km^{2})
  - Water: 0.02 sq mi (0.052 km^{2})
- Elevation: 33 ft (10 m)

Population (2010)
  - Total: 3,226
  - Density: 468.9/sq mi (181.0/km^{2})
- Source: 2010 Census
- Time zone: UTC−4 (AST)
- Postal code: 00795
- Area code: 787/939

Cintrona is a barrio in the municipality of Juana Díaz, Puerto Rico. Its population in 2010 was 3,226.

== History ==
Cintrona was in Spain's gazetteers until Puerto Rico was ceded by Spain in the aftermath of the Spanish–American War under the terms of the Treaty of Paris of 1898 and became an unincorporated territory of the United States. In 1899, the United States Department of War conducted a census of Puerto Rico finding that the population of Cintrona barrio was 1,132.

Historical population
Census	Pop.	Note	%±
1900	1,132		—
1910	1,036		−8.5%
1920	1,124		8.5%
1930	1,211		7.7%
1940	1,195		−1.3%
1950	1,424		19.2%
1960	1,161		−18.5%
1970	2,210		90.4%
1980	2,424		9.7%
1990	2,064		−14.9%
2000	2,309		11.9%
2010	3,226		39.7%
U.S. Decennial Census; 1899 (shown as 1900) 1910-1930; 1930-1950 1980-2000 2010

== See also ==
- List of communities in Puerto Rico
