= Coto Sur =

Barrio of Manatí, Puerto Rico

- Barrio
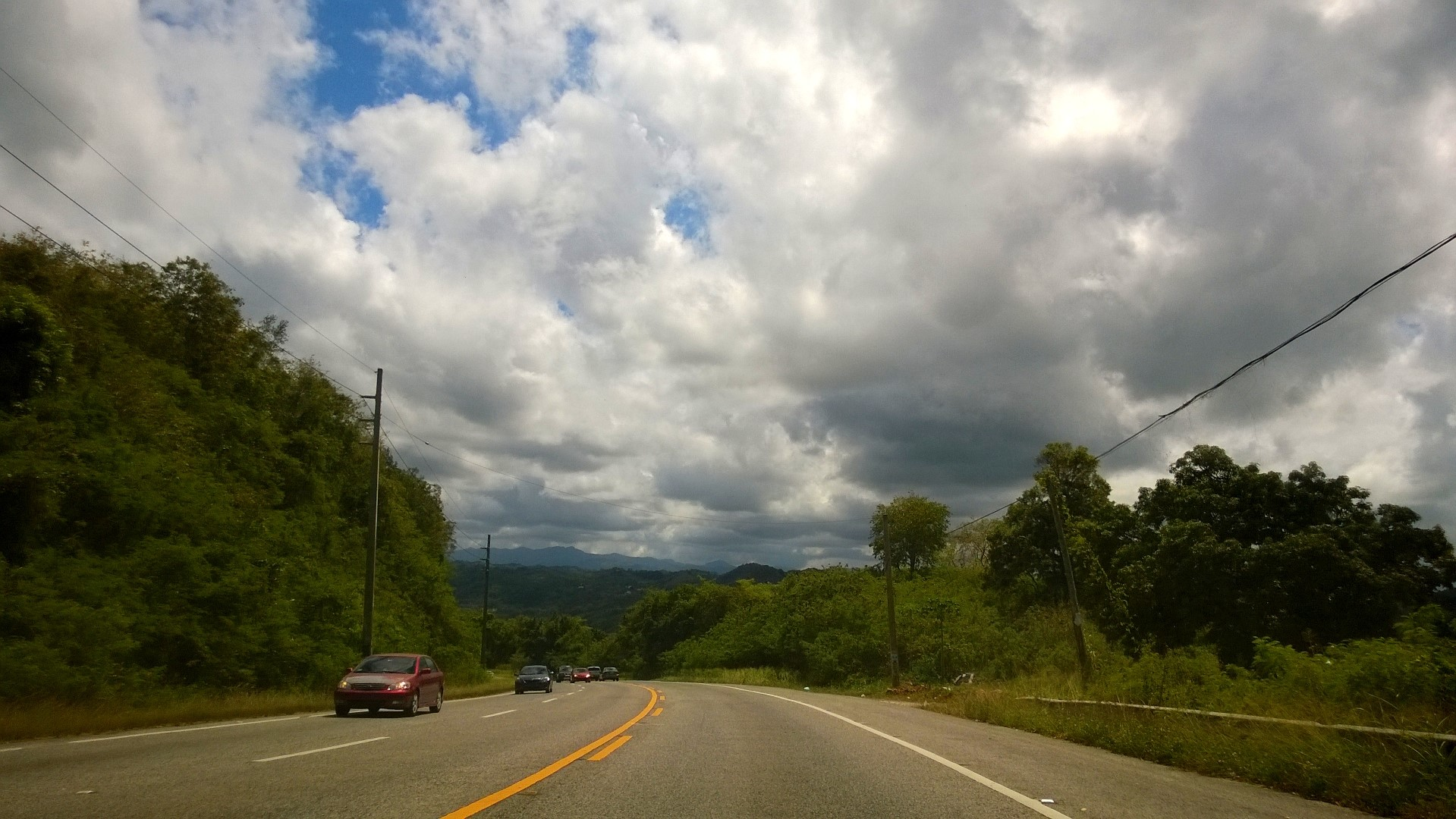
- Puerto Rico Highway 149 in Coto Sur

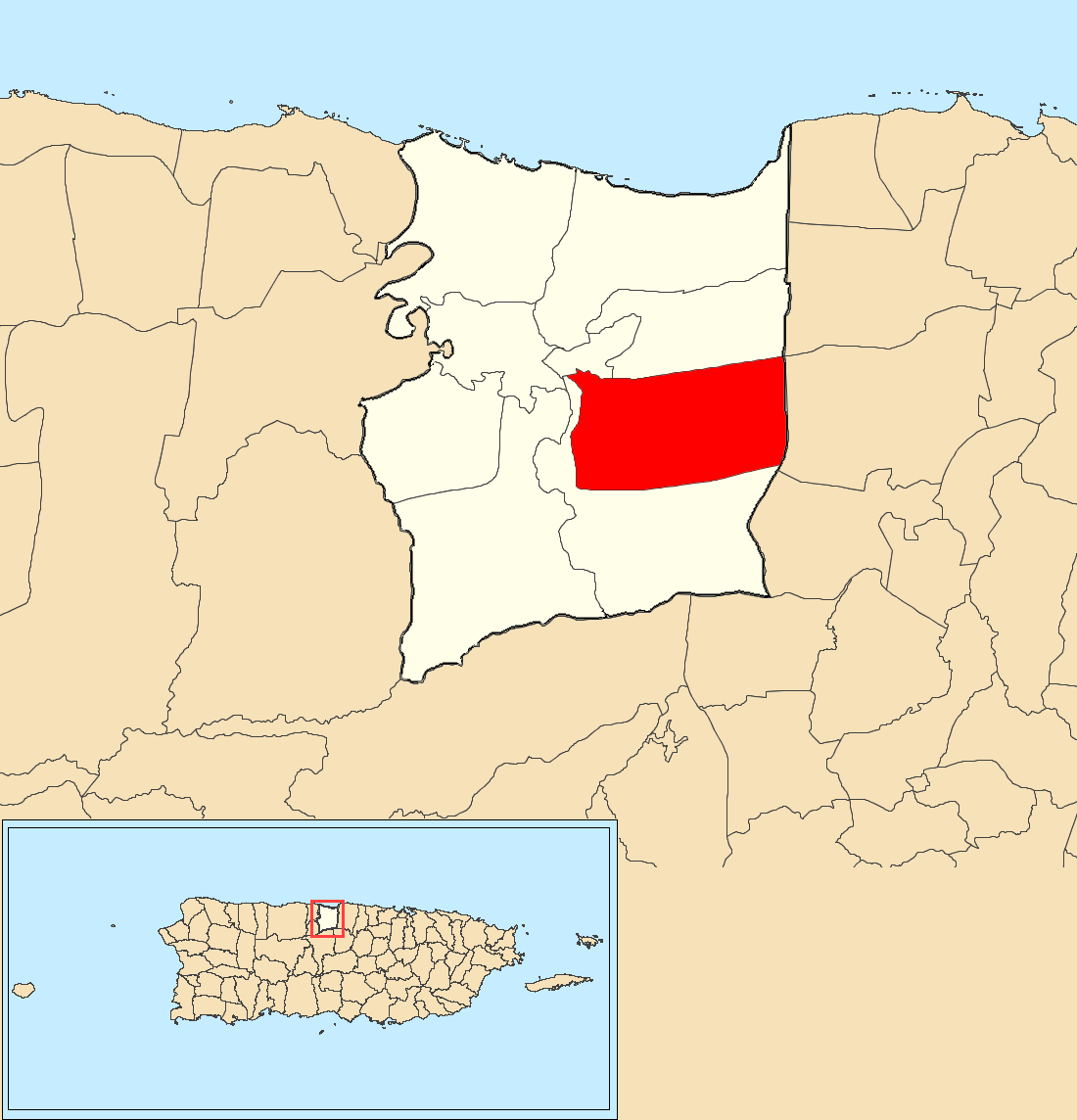
- Location of Coto Sur within the municipality of Manatí shown in red

- Location of Puerto Rico
- Coordinates: 18°24′46″N 66°27′57″W
- Commonwealth: Puerto Rico
- Municipality: Manatí

Area
  - Total: 6.26 sq mi (16.2 km^{2})
  - Land: 6.26 sq mi (16.2 km^{2})
  - Water: 0 sq mi (0 km^{2})
- Elevation: 377 ft (115 m)

Population (2010)
  - Total: 8,184
  - Density: 1,307.3/sq mi (504.8/km^{2})
- Source: 2010 Census
- Time zone: UTC−4 (AST)
- ZIP Code: 00674
- Area code: 787/939

Coto Sur is a barrio in the municipality of Manatí, Puerto Rico. Its population in 2010 was 8,184.

Historical population
Census	Pop.	Note	%±
1940	3,000		—
1950	3,997		33.2%
1960	4,399		10.1%
1970	0		−100.0%
1980	7,862		—
1990	7,572		−3.7%
2000	9,045		19.5%
2010	8,184		−9.5%
U.S. Decennial Census; 1900 (N/A) 1910-1930; 1930-1950 1980-2000 2010

== History ==
Coto Sur was in Spain's gazetteers until Puerto Rico was ceded by Spain in the aftermath of the Spanish–American War under the terms of the Treaty of Paris of 1898 and became an unincorporated territory of the United States. In 1899, the United States Department of War conducted a census of Puerto Rico finding that the combined population of Coto Sur and Coto Norte barrios was 2,110.

The community center, a baseball park and a basketball court was among some of the infrastructure destroyed by Hurricane Maria in 2017. Repairs were funded in 2020.

== Gallery ==
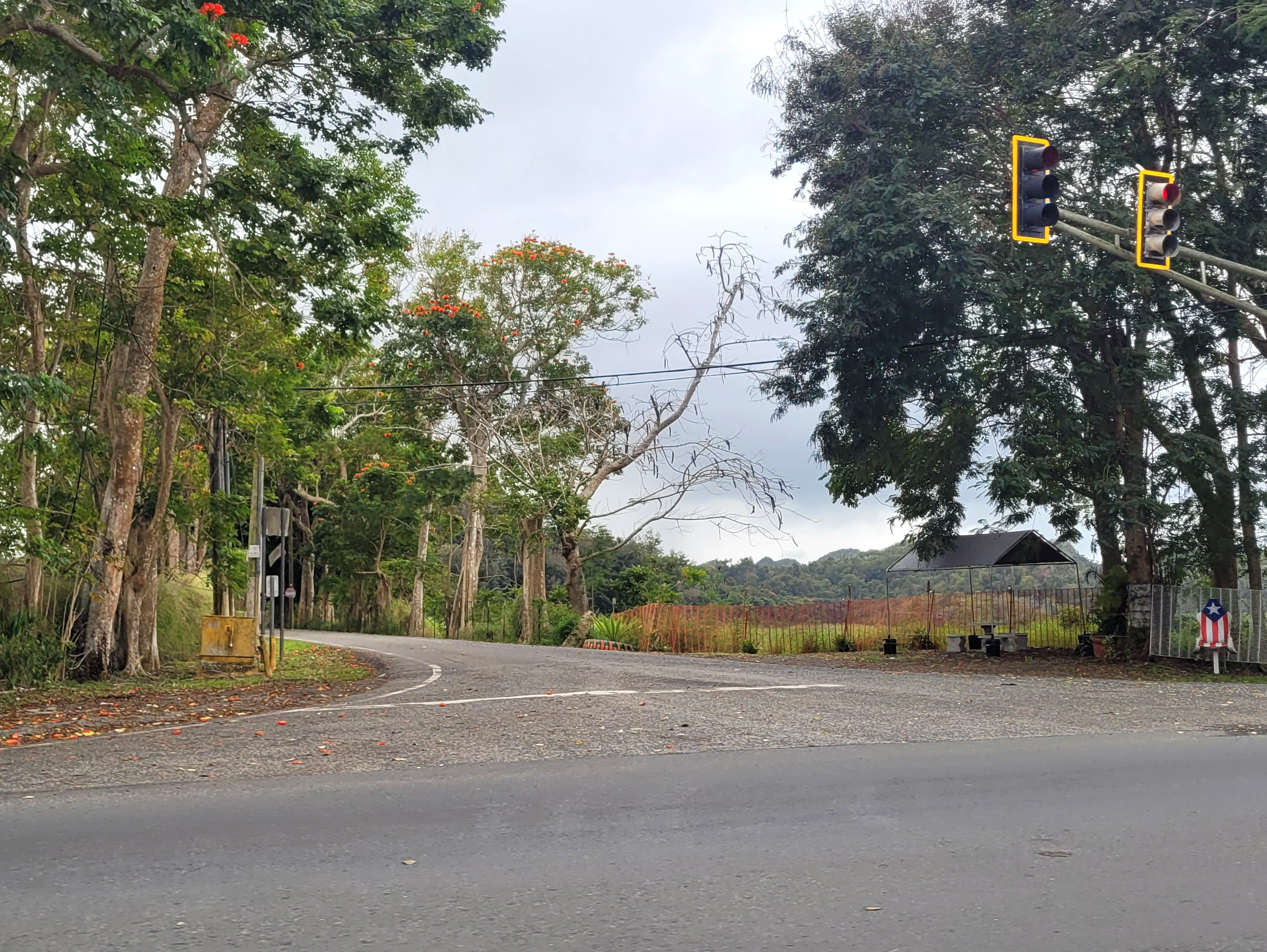
Puerto Rico Highway 672 in Coto Sur

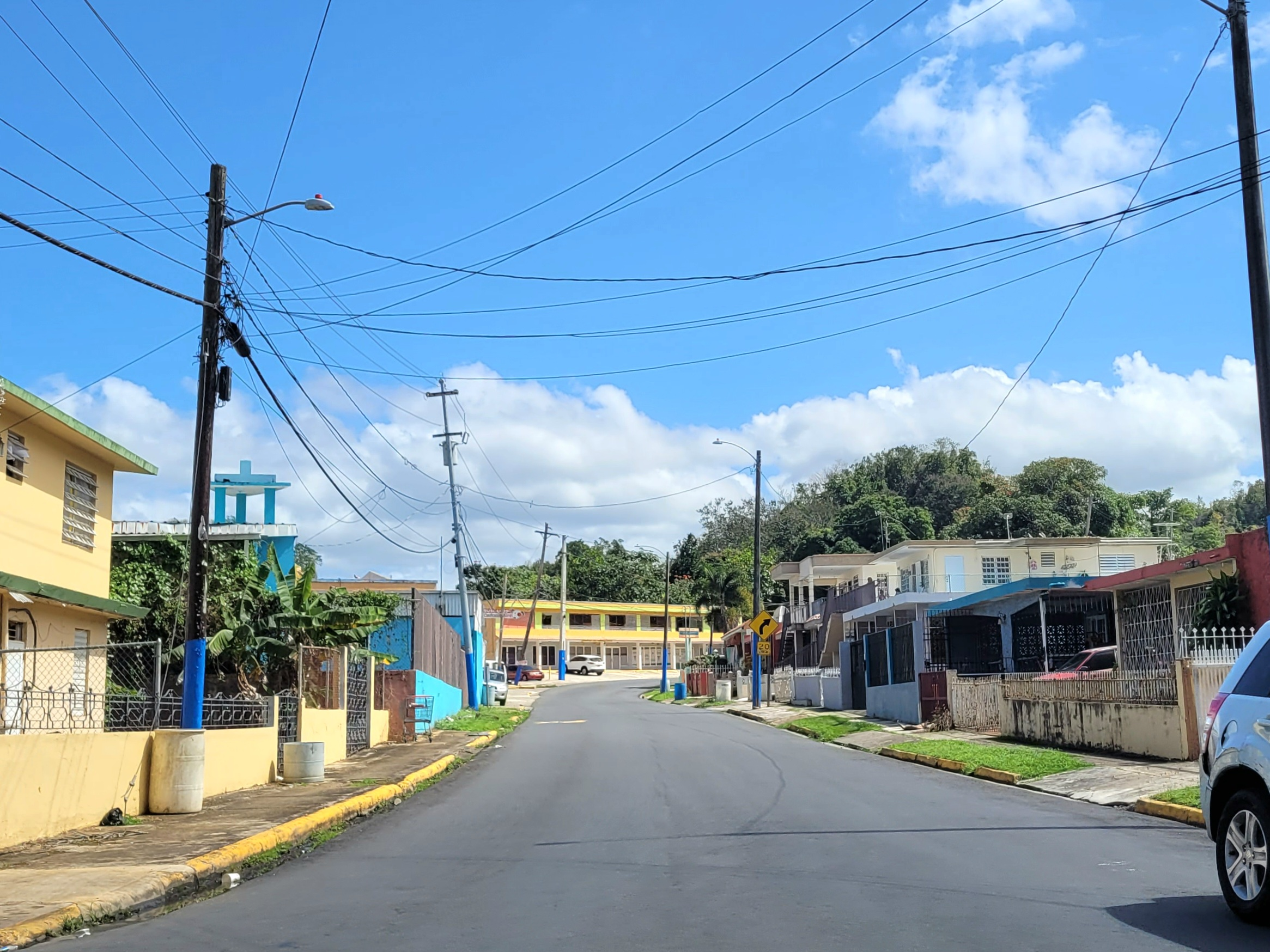
Puerto Rico Highway 6668 in Coto Sur

== See also ==
- List of communities in Puerto Rico
