= Lomas, Juana Díaz, Puerto Rico =

Barrio of Puerto Rico

Lomas
- Barrio
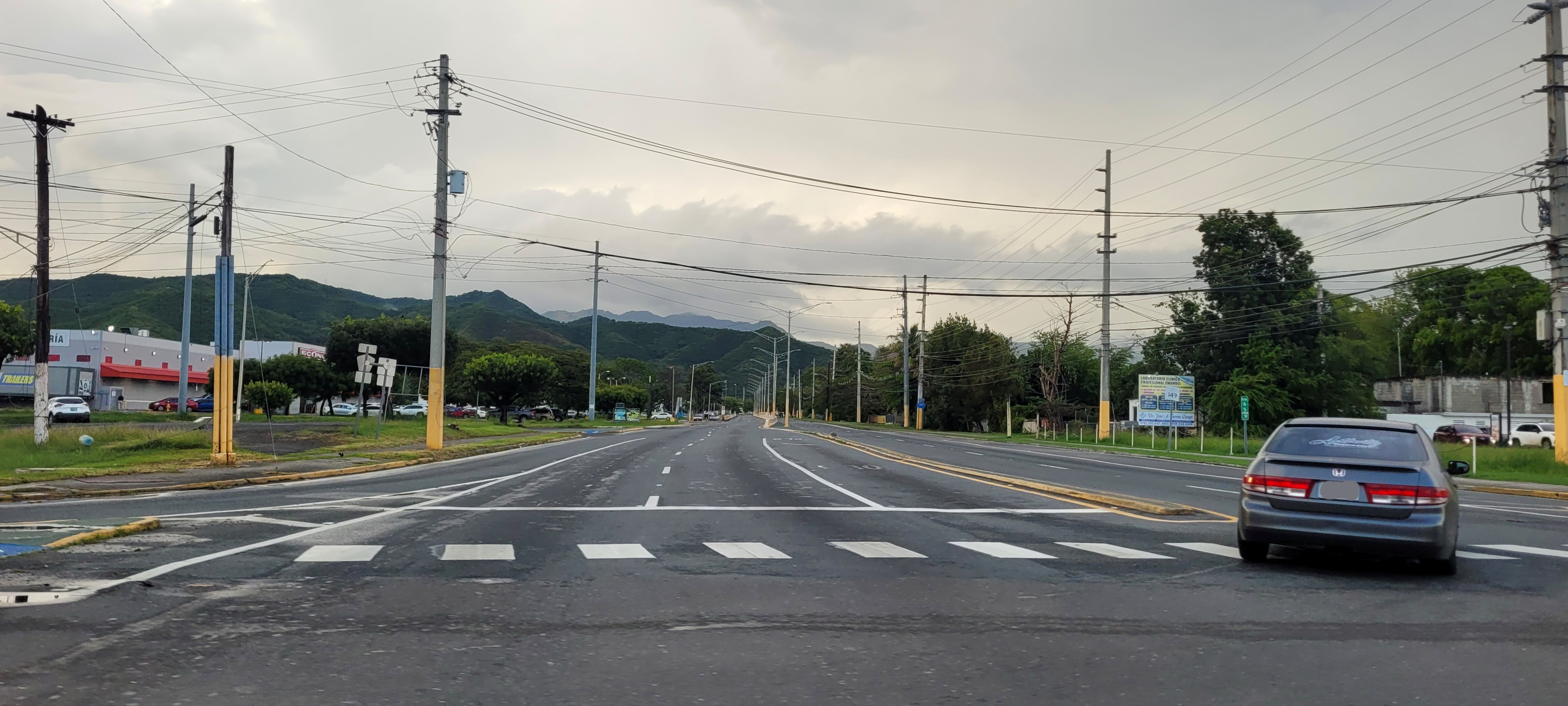
- Puerto Rico Highway 149 in Lomas

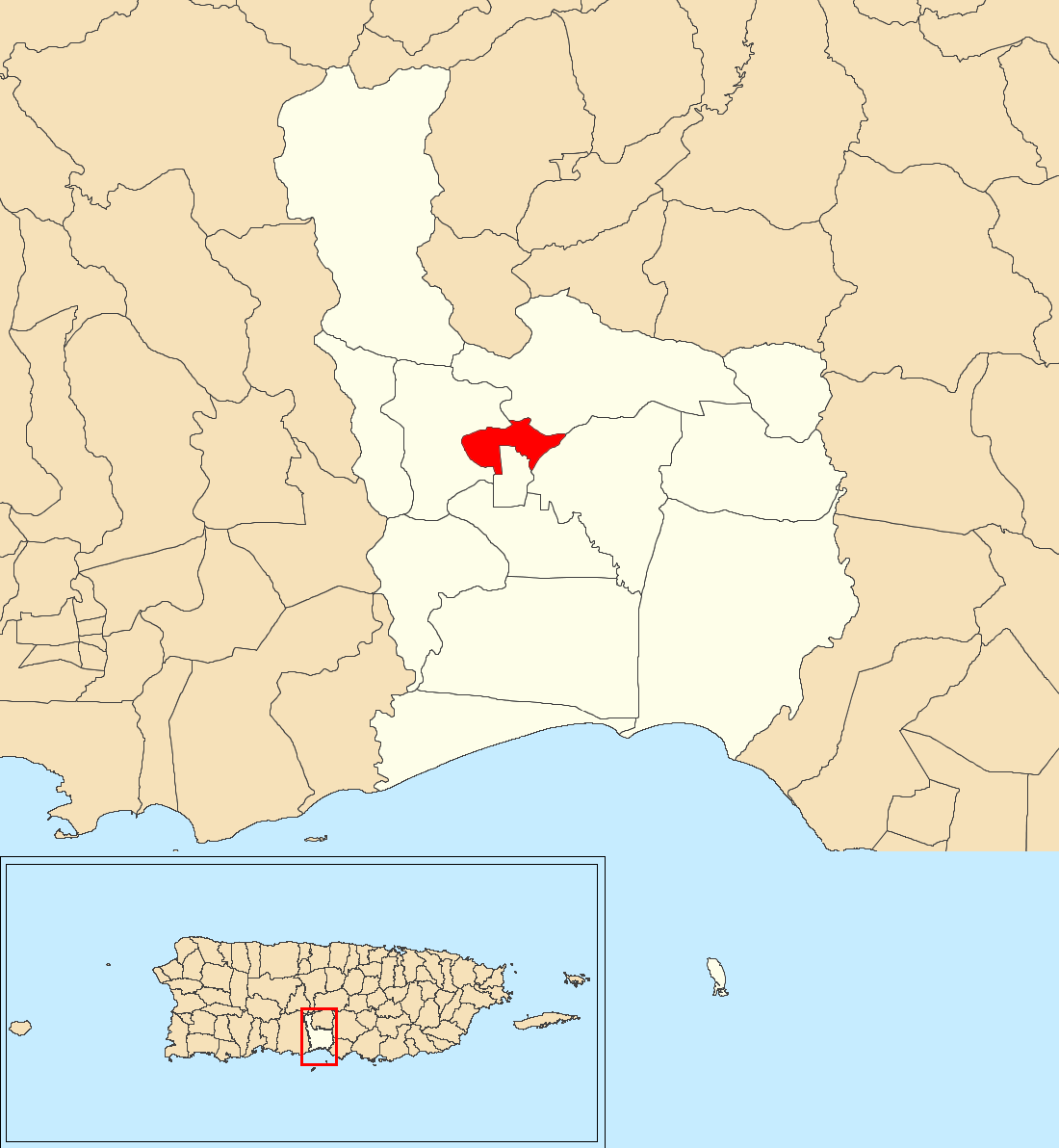
- Location of Lomas within the municipality of Juana Díaz shown in red

- Location of Puerto Rico
- Coordinates: 18°03′38″N 66°30′31″W
- Commonwealth: Puerto Rico
- Municipality: Juana Díaz

Area
  - Total: 0.73 sq mi (1.9 km^{2})
  - Land: 0.73 sq mi (1.9 km^{2})
  - Water: 0.00 sq mi (0 km^{2})
- Elevation: 210 ft (64 m)

Population (2010)
  - Total: 938
  - Density: 1,284.9/sq mi (496.1/km^{2})
- Source: 2010 Census
- Time zone: UTC−4 (AST)
- Postal code: 00795
- Area code: 787/939

Lomas is a barrio in the municipality of Juana Díaz, Puerto Rico. Its population in 2010 was 938.

== History ==
Lomas was in Spain's gazetteers until Puerto Rico was ceded by Spain in the aftermath of the Spanish–American War under the terms of the Treaty of Paris of 1898 and became an unincorporated territory of the United States. In 1899, the United States Department of War conducted a census of Puerto Rico finding that the combined population of Lomas and Sabana Llana barrios was 938.

Historical population
Census	Pop.	Note	%±
1910	699		—
1920	752		7.6%
1930	939		24.9%
1940	1,096		16.7%
1950	1,241		13.2%
1960	1,197		−3.5%
1970	0		−100.0%
1980	1,355		—
1990	1,754		29.4%
2000	1,358		−22.6%
2010	938		−30.9%
U.S. Decennial Census; 1900 (N/A) 1910-1930; 1930-1950 1980-2000 2010

== See also ==
- List of communities in Puerto Rico
