= Río Arriba Saliente =

Barrio of Manatí, Puerto Rico

- Barrio
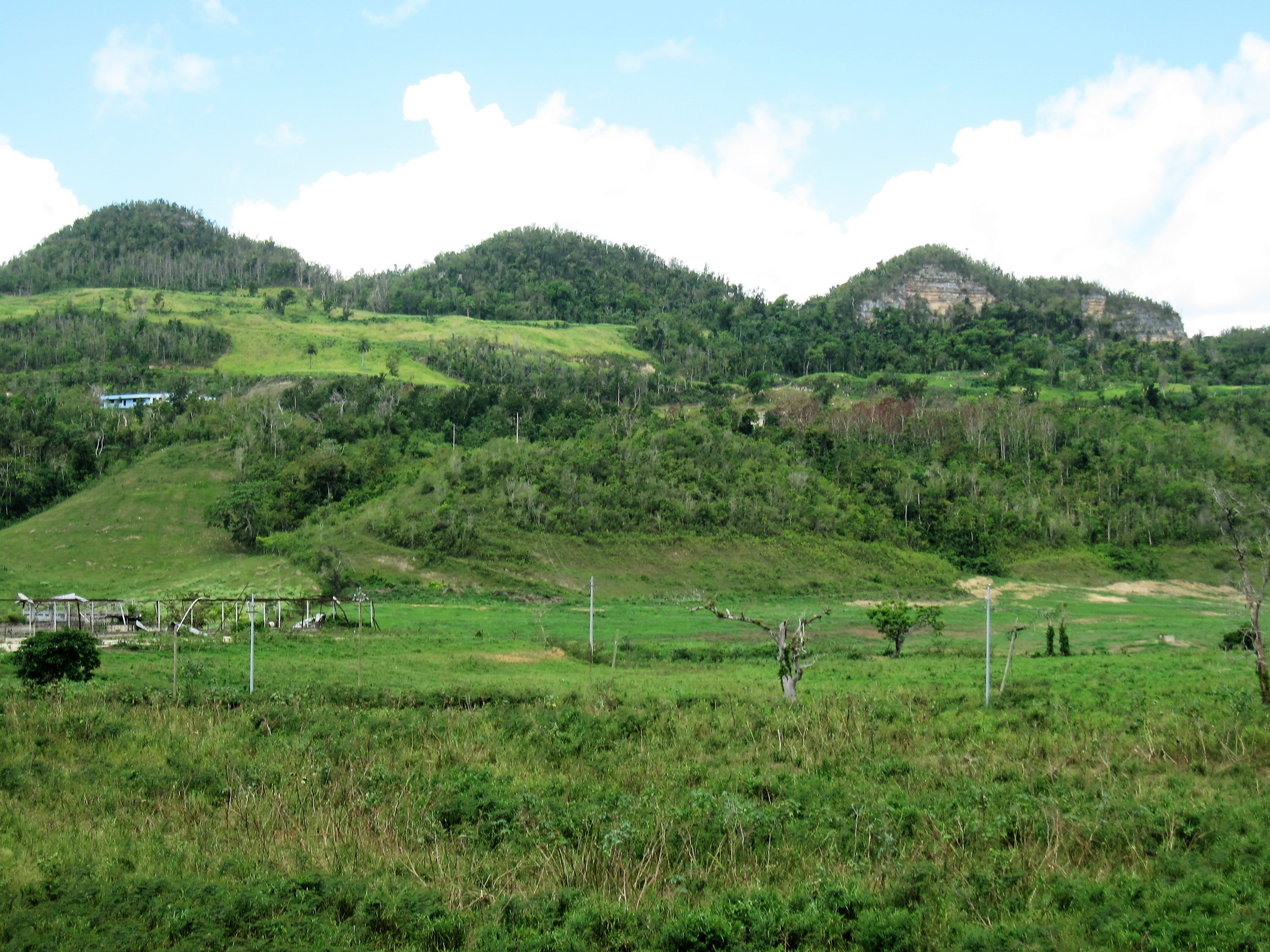
- Río Arriba Saliente barrio from bridge on PR-642, near junction with Puerto Rico Highway 6685

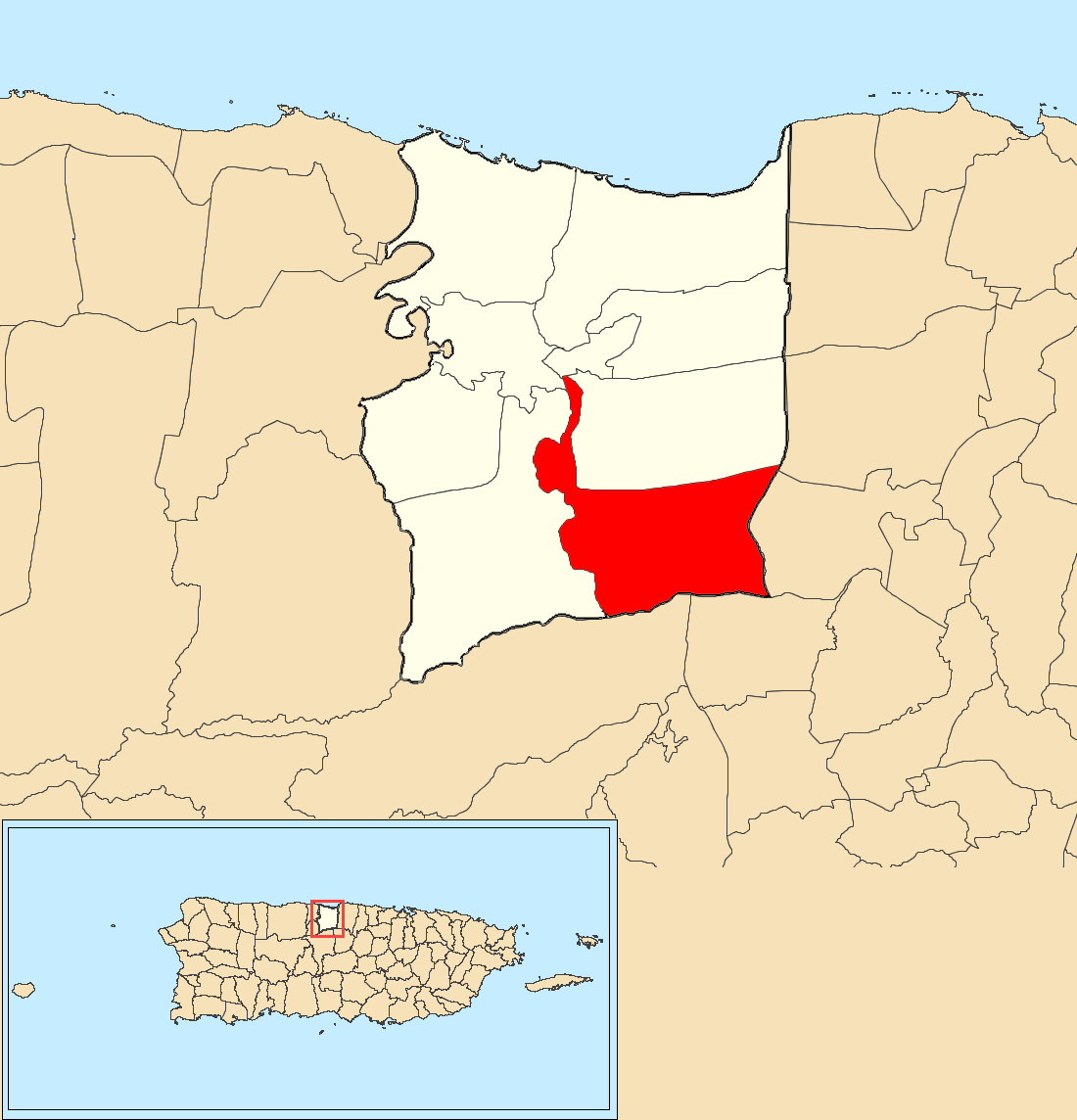
- Location of Río Arriba Saliente within the municipality of Manatí shown in red

- Location of Puerto Rico
- Coordinates: 18°23′12″N 66°28′13″W
- Commonwealth: Puerto Rico
- Municipality: Manatí

Area
  - Total: 6.62 sq mi (17.1 km^{2})
  - Land: 6.55 sq mi (17.0 km^{2})
  - Water: 0.07 sq mi (0.18 km^{2})
- Elevation: 614 ft (187 m)

Population (2010)
  - Total: 3,592
  - Density: 549.2/sq mi (212.0/km^{2})
- Source: 2010 Census
- Time zone: UTC−4 (AST)
- ZIP Code: 00674
- Area code: 787/939

Río Arriba Saliente is a rural barrio in the municipality of Manatí, Puerto Rico. Its population in 2010 was 3,592.

Historical population
Census	Pop.	Note	%±
1900	1,593		—
1910	2,041		28.1%
1920	2,467		20.9%
1930	2,619		6.2%
1940	3,096		18.2%
1950	3,087		−0.3%
1960	2,051		−33.6%
1970	0		−100.0%
1980	2,298		—
1990	2,445		6.4%
2000	3,119		27.6%
2010	3,592		15.2%
U.S. Decennial Census; 1899 (shown as 1900) 1910-1930; 1930-1950 1980-2000 2010

== History ==
Río Arriba Saliente was in Spain's gazetteers until Puerto Rico was ceded by Spain in the aftermath of the Spanish–American War under the terms of the Treaty of Paris of 1898 and became an unincorporated territory of the United States. In 1899, the United States Department of War conducted a census of Puerto Rico finding that the population of Río Arriba Saliente barrio was 1,593.

== Gallery ==
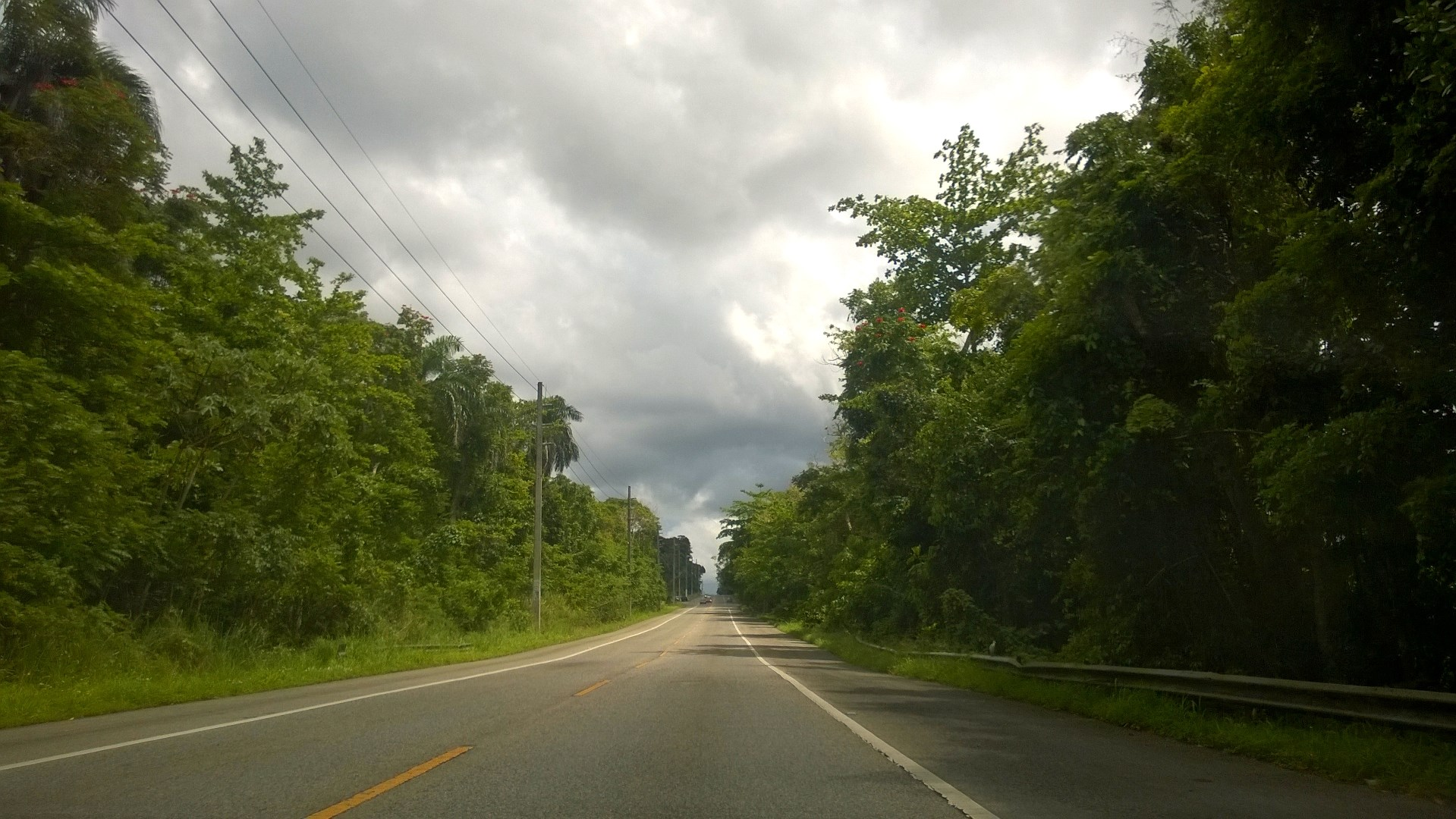
Puerto Rico Highway 149 in Río Arriba Saliente barrio

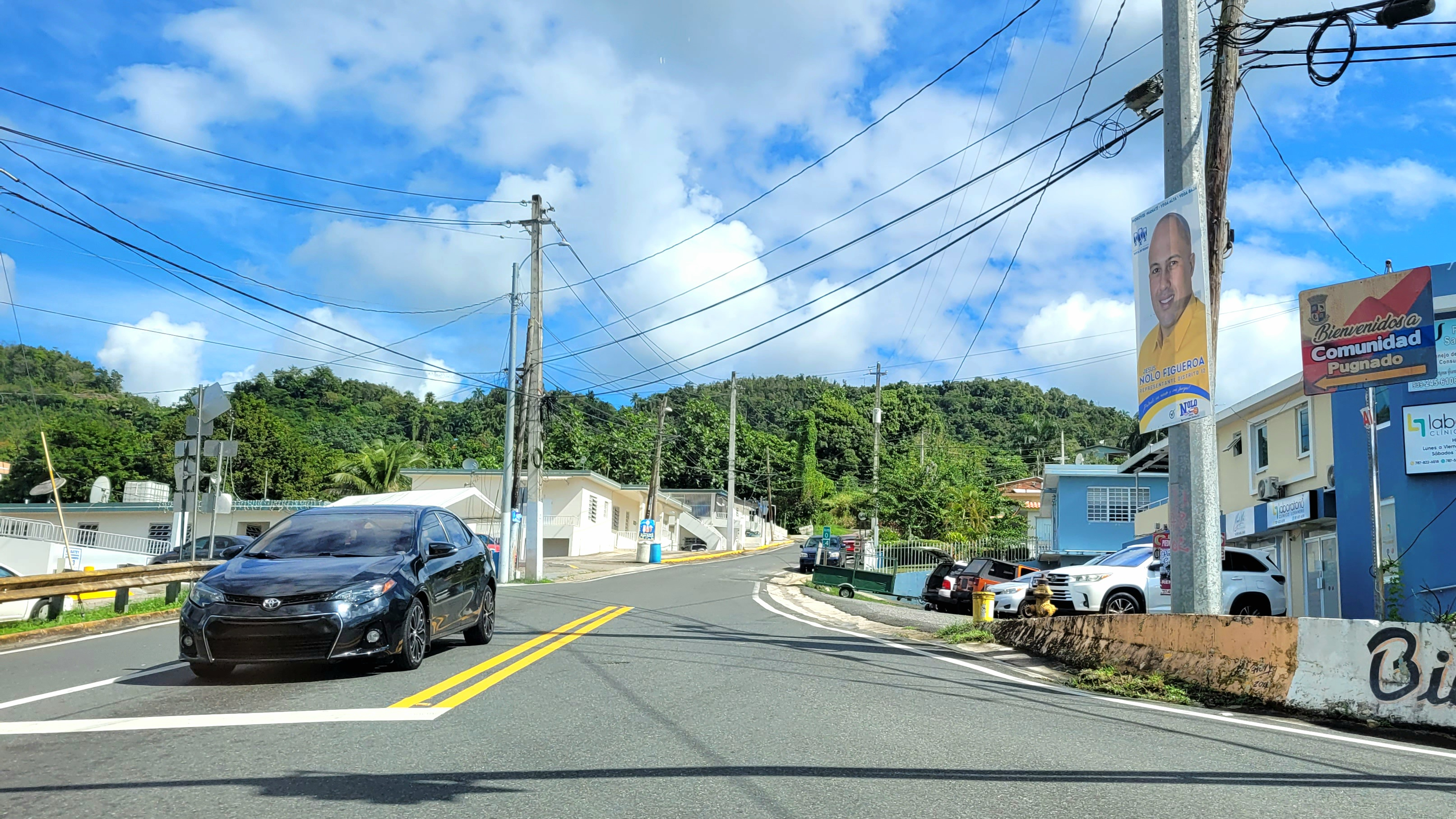
Puerto Rico Highway 643 in Río Arriba Saliente barrio

== See also ==
- List of communities in Puerto Rico
