= Cueva Lucero =

Archaeological site in Puerto Rico

- U.S. National Register of Historic Places
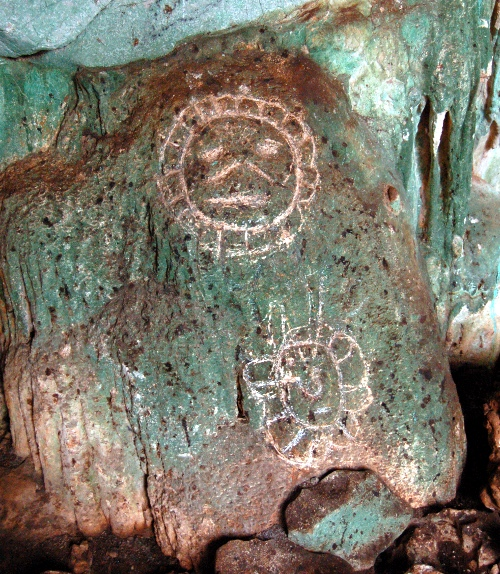
- Location: Address restricted
- Nearest city: Juana Díaz, Puerto Rico
- Area: 0.085 acres (340 m^{2})
- Built: 600
- MPS: Prehistoric Rock Art of Puerto Rico MPS
- NRHP reference No.: 08000936
- Added to NRHP: September 26, 2008

Cueva Lucero (English: Star Cave) is a cave and archeological site in the Guayabal barrio of the Juana Díaz municipality, in Puerto Rico.

== Description ==
The cave includes more than 100 petroglyphs and pictographs "making it one of the best examples of aboriginal rock art in the Antilles." It has been known to archeologists since at least the early 1900s. Most of its images are zoomorphic. The site is known to locals including rock-climbers and spelunkers and there is some modern graffiti.

== Status ==
The cave was listed on the National Register of Historic Places in 2008.

== Gallery ==
View from inside Cueva Lucero:

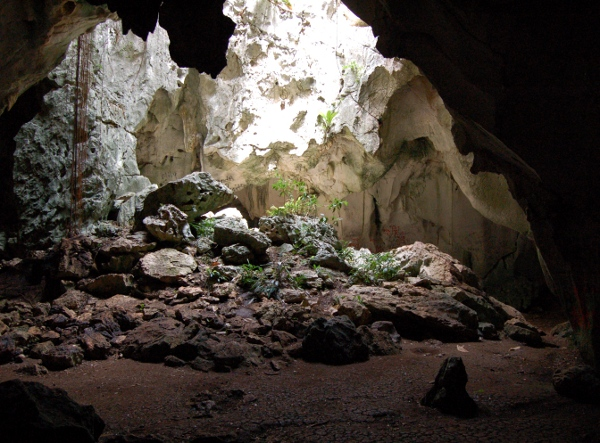

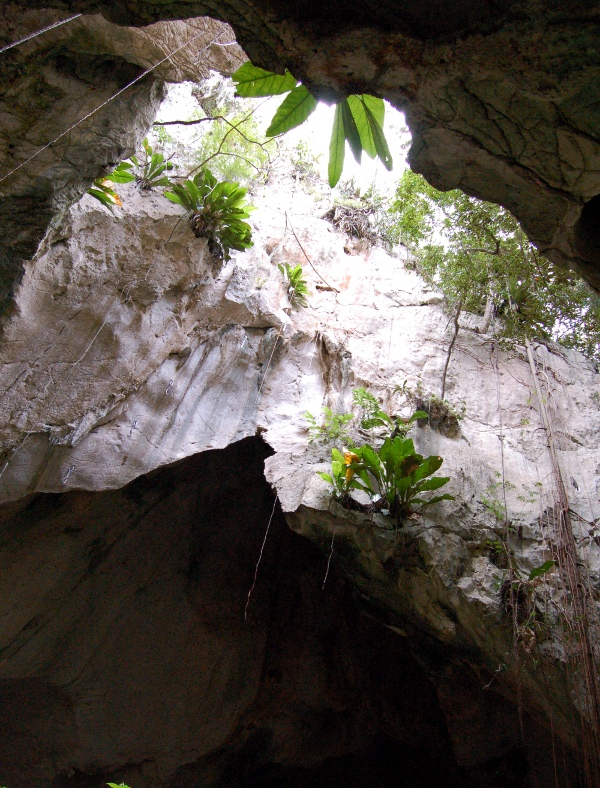

== See also ==
- National Register of Historic Places listings in Juana Díaz, Puerto Rico
