= Coto Norte =

Barrio of Manatí, Puerto Rico

- Barrio
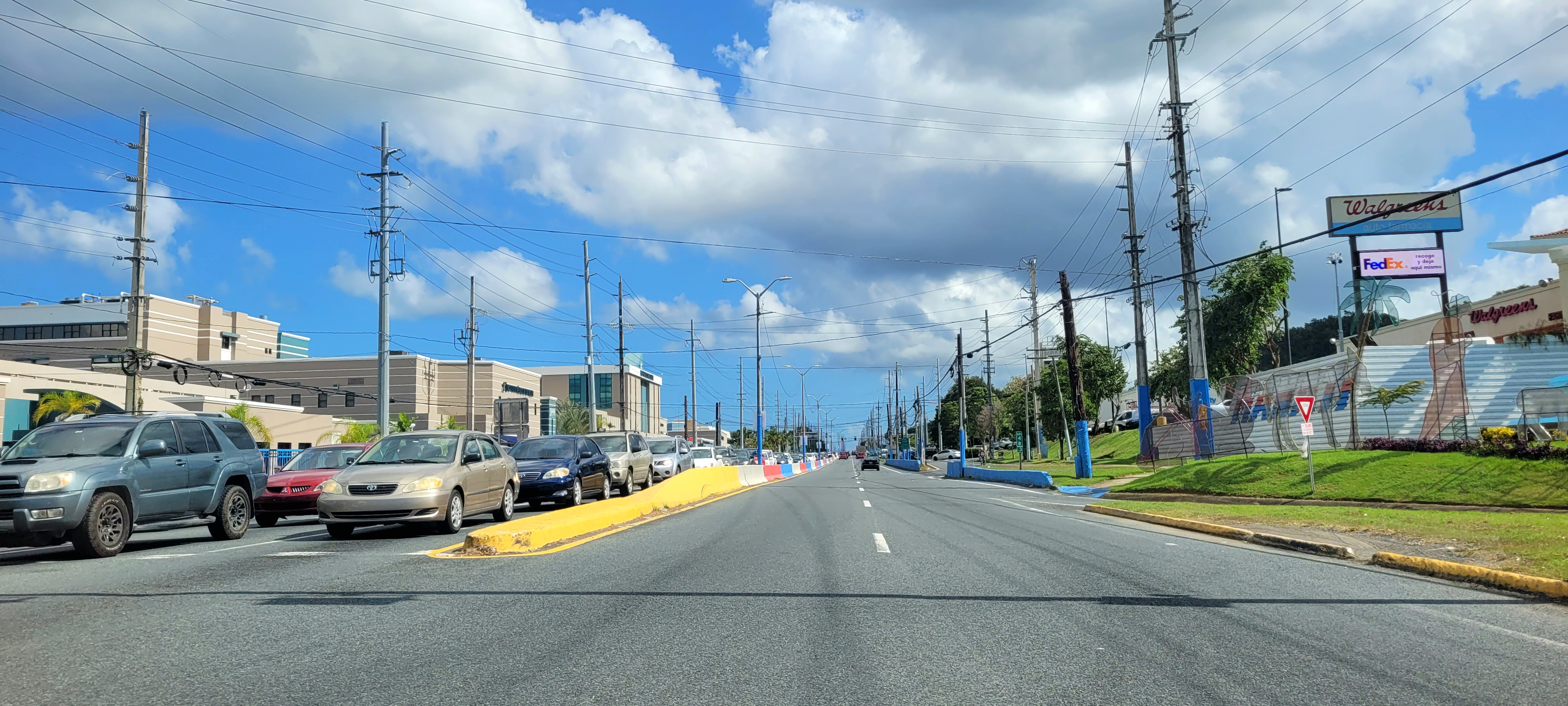
- Puerto Rico Highway 2 in Coto Norte

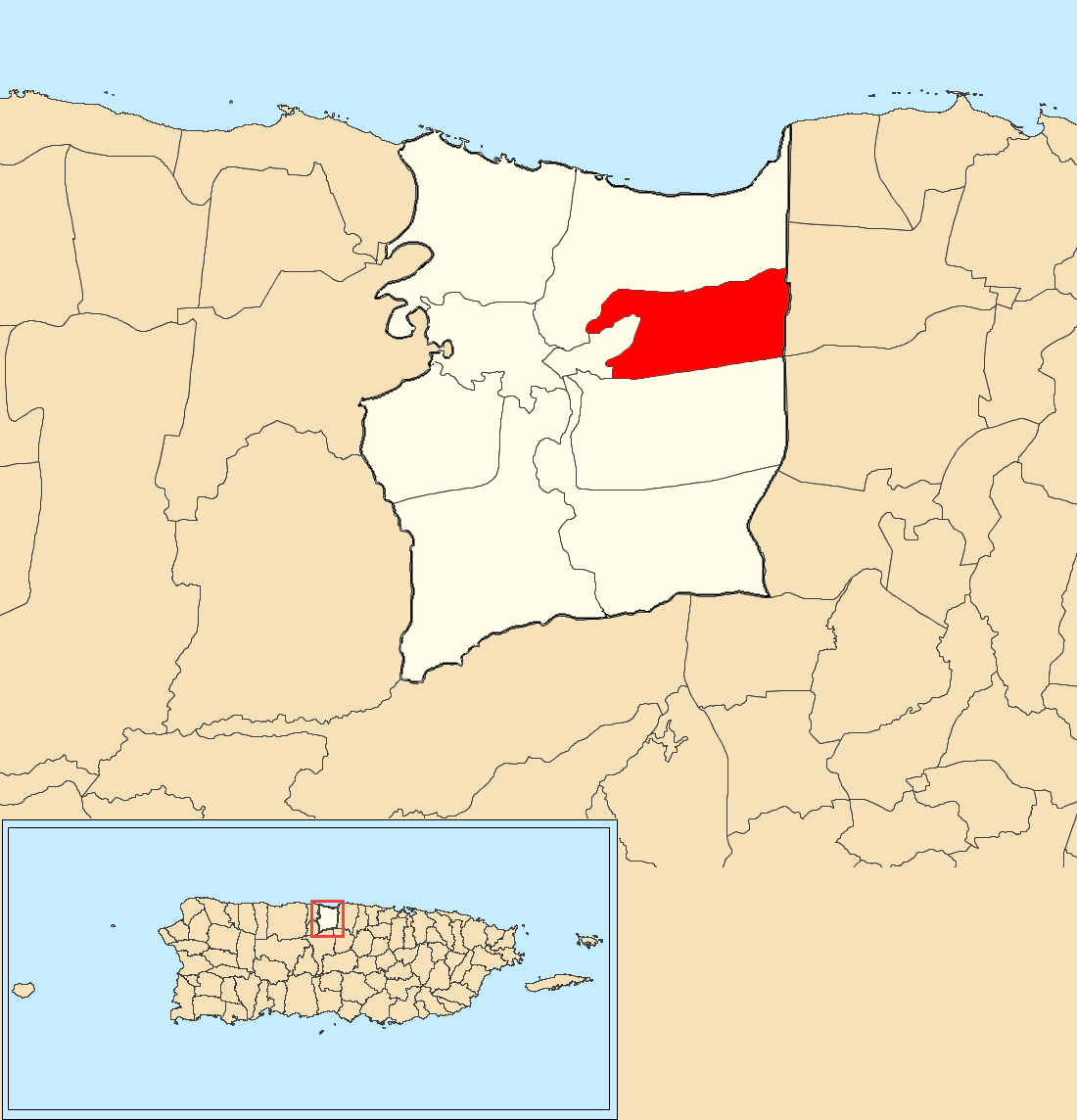
- Location of Coto Norte within the municipality of Manatí shown in red

- Location of Puerto Rico
- Coordinates: 18°26′03″N 66°27′37″W
- Commonwealth: Puerto Rico
- Municipality: Manatí

Area
  - Total: 3.88 sq mi (10.0 km^{2})
  - Land: 3.88 sq mi (10.0 km^{2})
  - Water: 0 sq mi (0 km^{2})
- Elevation: 161 ft (49 m)

Population (2010)
  - Total: 11,250
  - Density: 2,899.5/sq mi (1,119.5/km^{2})
- Source: 2010 Census
- Time zone: UTC−4 (AST)
- ZIP Code: 00674
- Area code: 787/939

Coto Norte is a rural barrio with an urban zone in the municipality of Manatí, Puerto Rico. Its population in 2010 was 11,250.

Historical population
Census	Pop.	Note	%±
1940	2,881		—
1950	2,730		−5.2%
1960	4,060		48.7%
1970	0		−100.0%
1980	7,795		—
1990	8,865		13.7%
2000	11,311		27.6%
2010	11,250		−0.5%
U.S. Decennial Census; 1900 (N/A) 1910-1930; 1930-1950 1980-2000 2010

== History ==
Coto Norte was in Spain's gazetteers until Puerto Rico was ceded by Spain in the aftermath of the Spanish–American War under the terms of the Treaty of Paris of 1898 and became an unincorporated territory of the United States. In 1899, the United States Department of War conducted a census of Puerto Rico finding that the combined population of Coto Norte and Coto Sur barrios was 2,110.

== Gallery ==
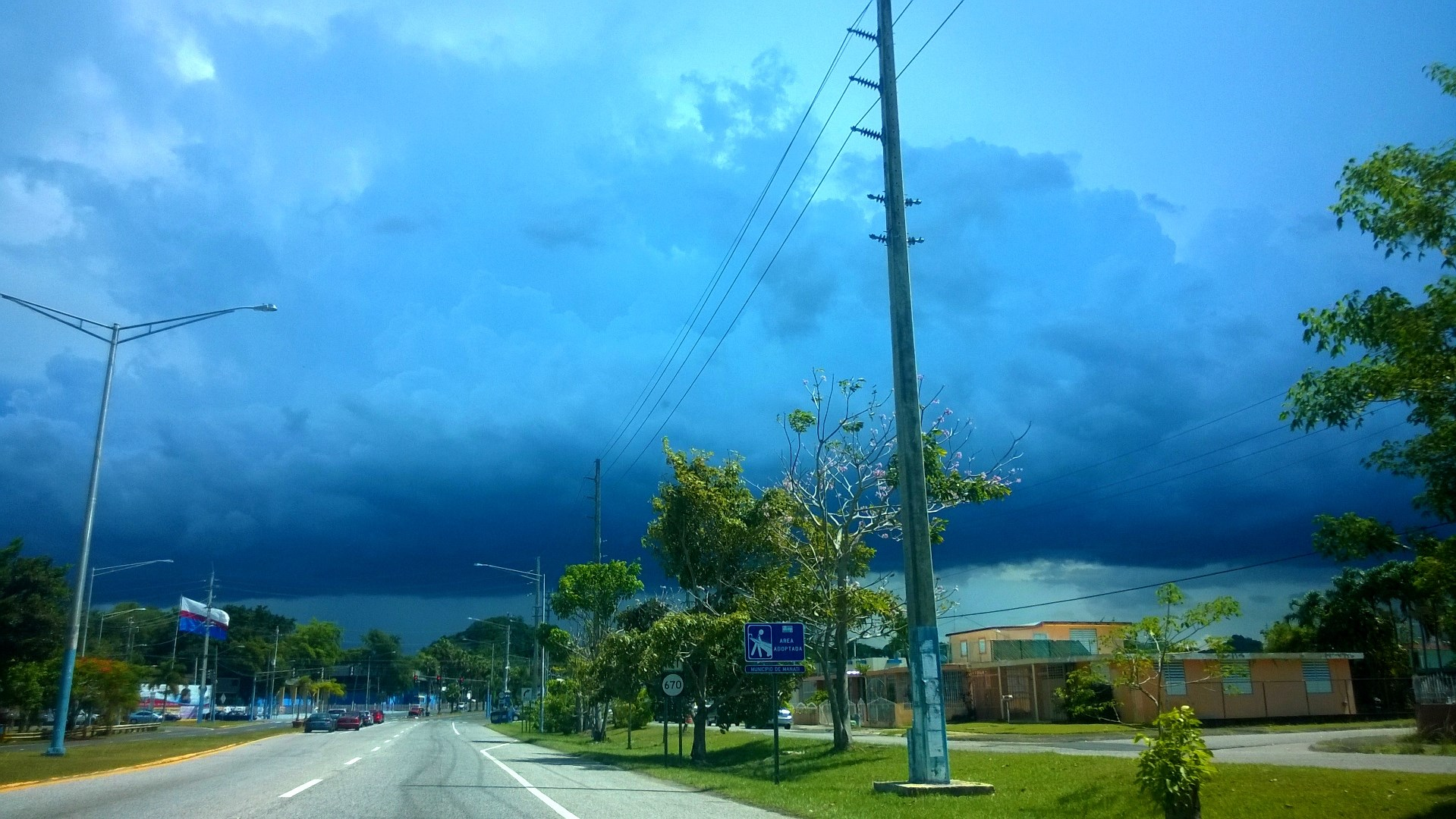
Puerto Rico Highway 149 in Coto Norte

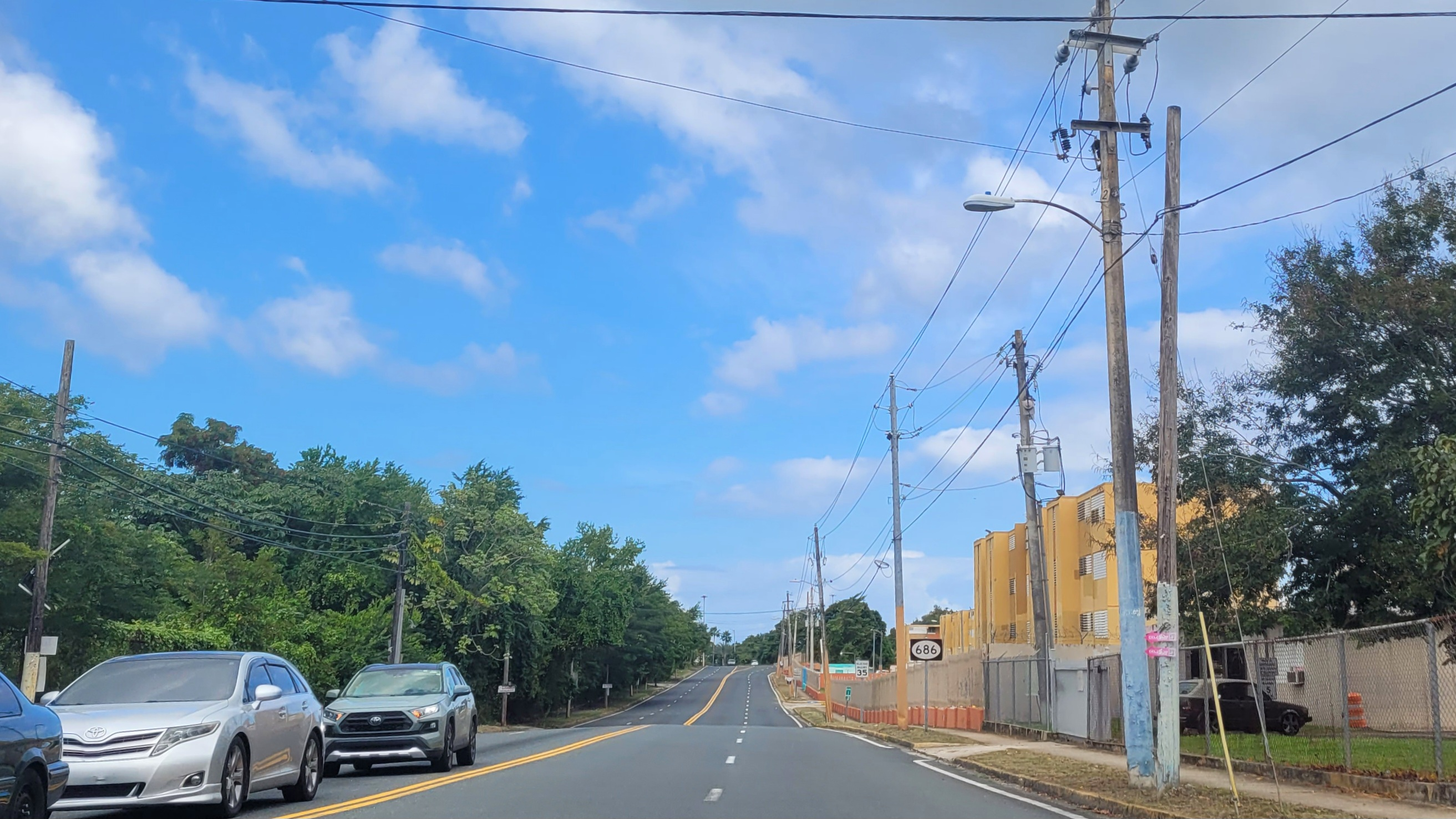
Puerto Rico Highway 686 in Coto Norte

== See also ==
- List of communities in Puerto Rico
