= Collores, Juana Díaz, Puerto Rico =

Barrio of Puerto Rico

Collores
- Barrio
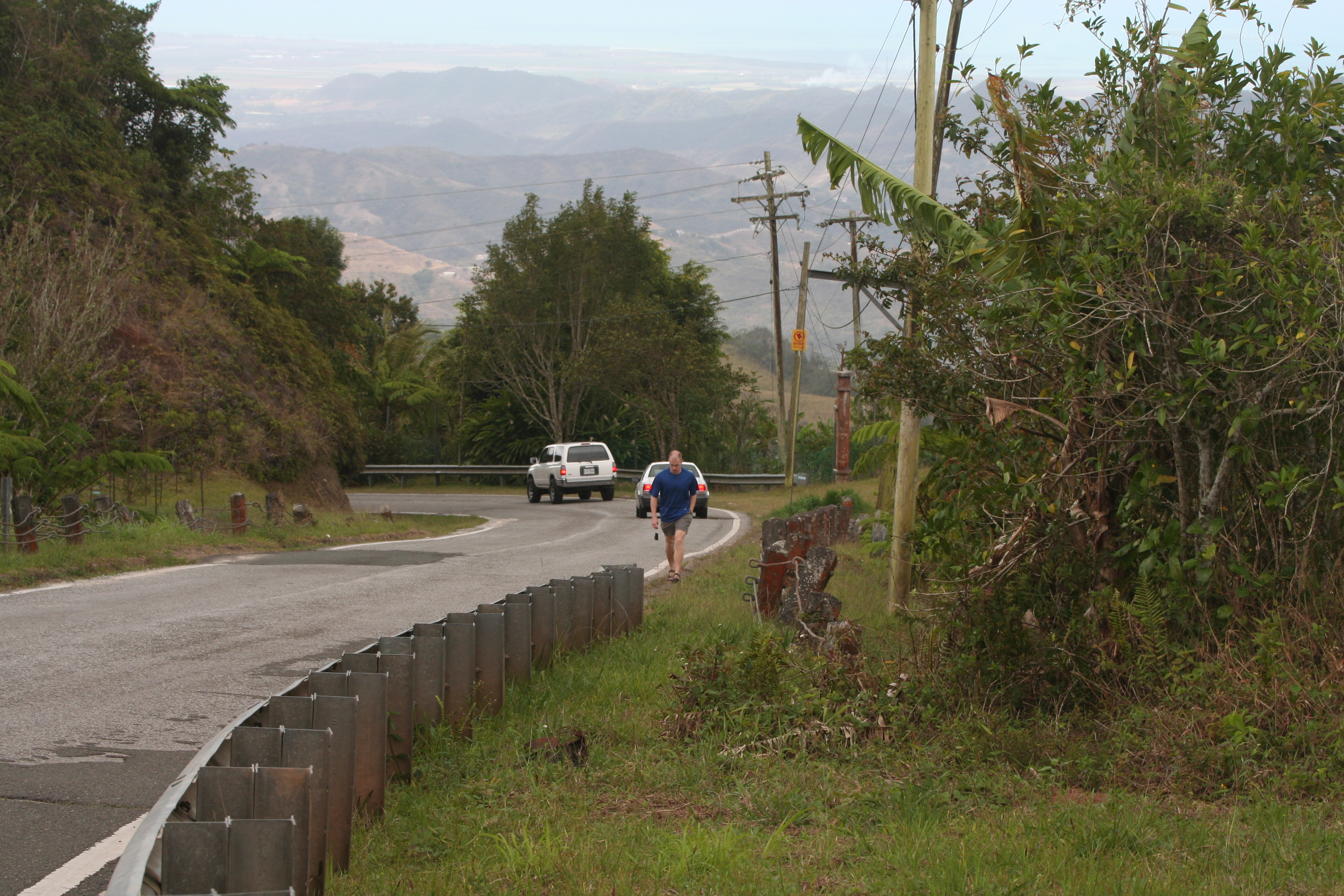
- A section of Ruta Panorámica in Collores

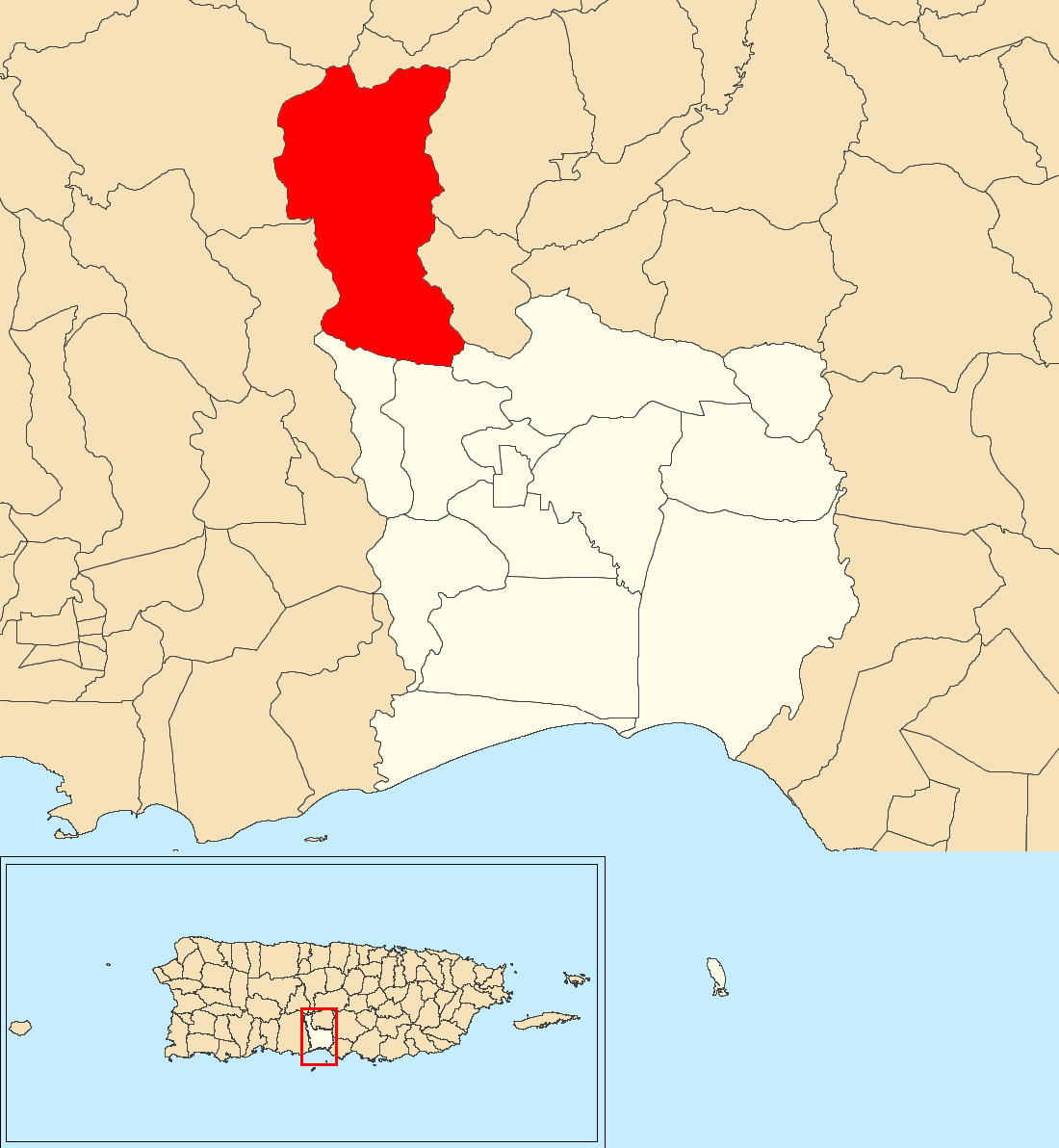
- Location of Collores within the municipality of Juana Díaz shown in red

- Location of Puerto Rico
- Coordinates: 18°07′05″N 66°32′28″W
- Commonwealth: Puerto Rico
- Municipality: Juana Díaz

Area
  - Total: 10.21 sq mi (26.4 km^{2})
  - Land: 10.21 sq mi (26.4 km^{2})
  - Water: 0.00 sq mi (0 km^{2})
- Elevation: 965 ft (294 m)

Population (2010)
  - Total: 2,073
  - Density: 203/sq mi (78/km^{2})
- Source: 2010 Census
- Time zone: UTC−4 (AST)
- Postal code: 00795
- Area code: 787/939

Collores is a barrio in the municipality of Juana Díaz, Puerto Rico. Its population in 2010 was 2,073.

Luis Lloréns Torres poem El Valle de Collores has made Collores one of the most well-known barrios of the island of Puerto Rico.

== History ==
Collores was in Spain's gazetteers until Puerto Rico was ceded by Spain in the aftermath of the Spanish–American War under the terms of the Treaty of Paris of 1898 and became an unincorporated territory of the United States. In 1899, the United States Department of War conducted a census of Puerto Rico finding that the population of Collores barrio was 2,835.

Historical population
Census	Pop.	Note	%±
1900	2,835		—
1910	2,899		2.3%
1920	2,935		1.2%
1930	2,717		−7.4%
1940	2,461		−9.4%
1950	2,302		−6.5%
1960	2,340		1.7%
1970	2,407		2.9%
1980	2,193		−8.9%
1990	2,223		1.4%
2000	2,161		−2.8%
2010	2,073		−4.1%
U.S. Decennial Census; 1899 (shown as 1900) 1910-1930; 1930-1950 1980-2000 2010

== Gallery ==
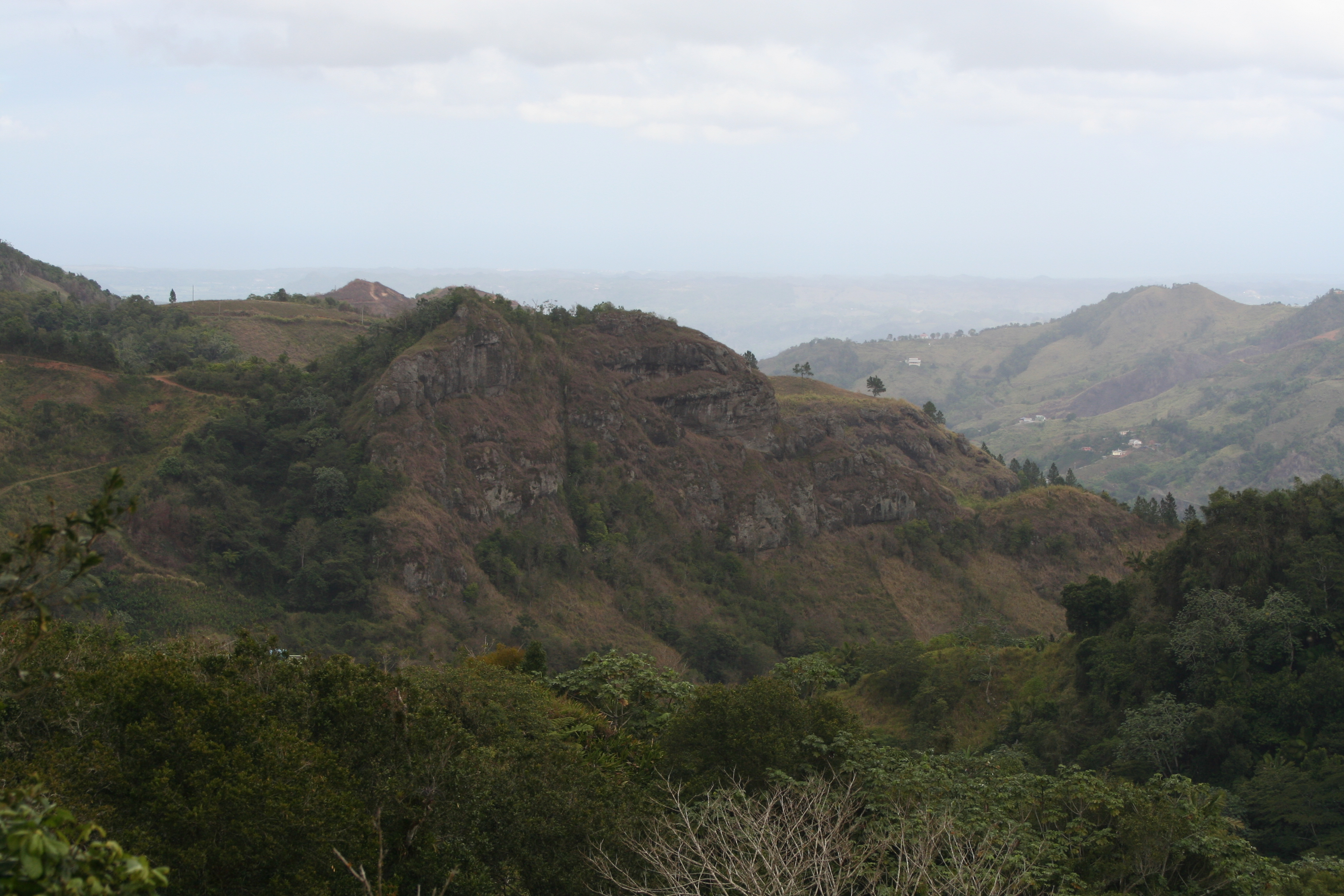
Panoramic view from Collores

== See also ==
- List of communities in Puerto Rico
