= Amuelas =

Barrio of Juana Díaz, Puerto Rico

- Barrio
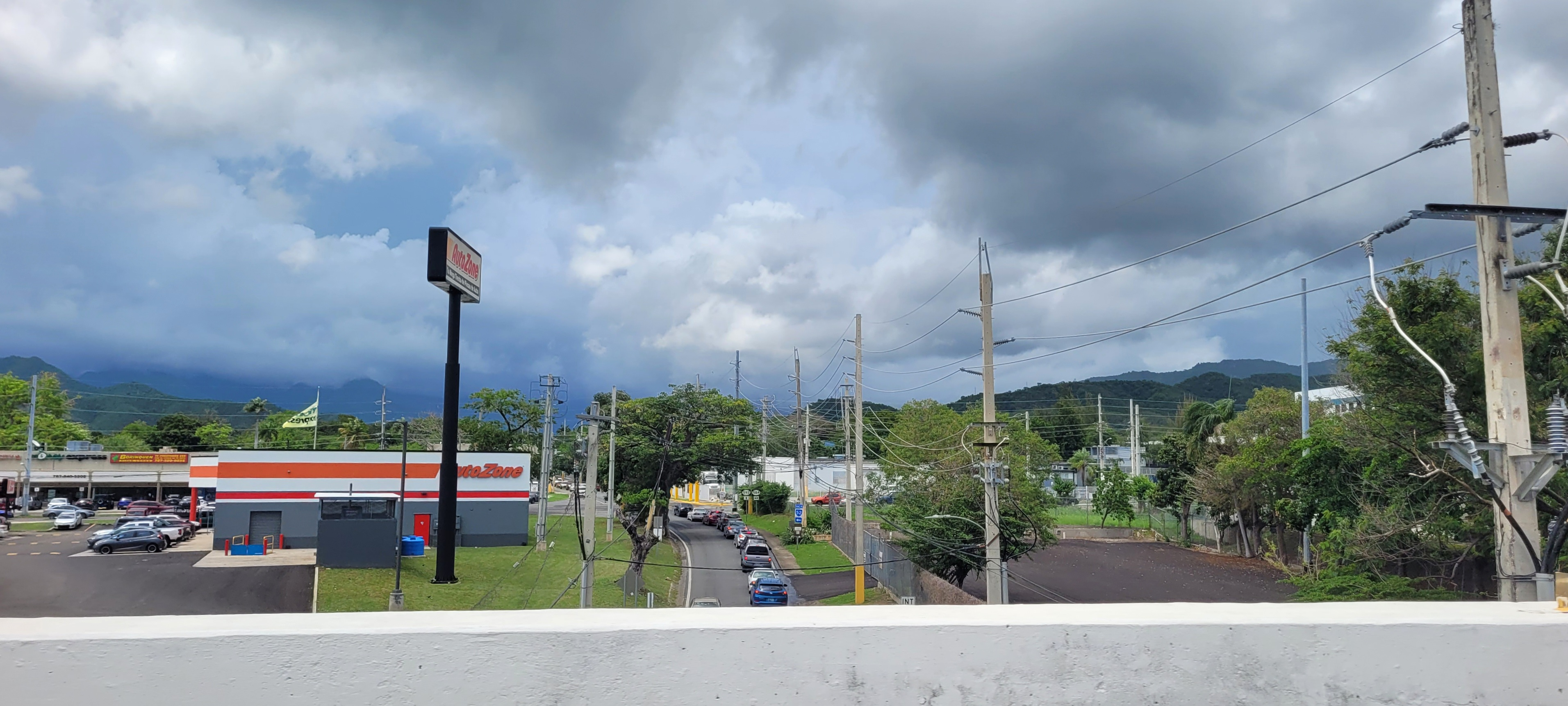
- Puerto Rico Highway 592 in Amuelas

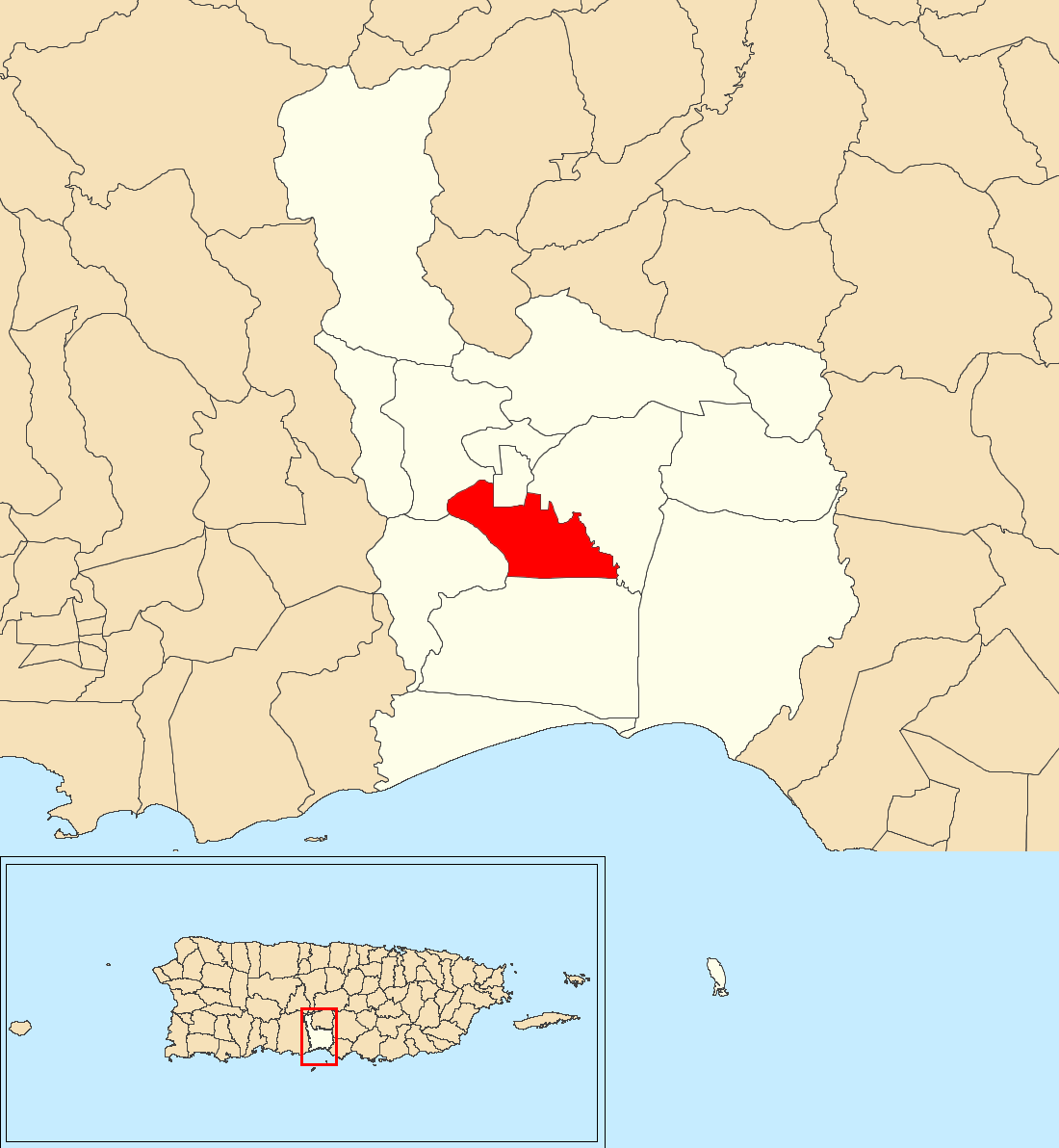
- Location of Amuelas within the municipality of Juana Díaz shown in red

- Location of Puerto Rico
- Coordinates: 18°02′12″N 66°30′09″W
- Commonwealth: Puerto Rico
- Municipality: Juana Díaz

Area
  - Total: 2.36 sq mi (6.1 km^{2})
  - Land: 2.35 sq mi (6.1 km^{2})
  - Water: 0.01 sq mi (0.026 km^{2})
- Elevation: 118 ft (36 m)

Population (2010)
  - Total: 4,575
  - Density: 1,946.8/sq mi (751.7/km^{2})
- Source: 2010 Census
- Time zone: UTC−4 (AST)
- ZIP Code: 00795
- Area code: 787/939

Amuelas is a barrio in the municipality of Juana Díaz, Puerto Rico. Its population in 2010 was 4,575.

== History ==
Amuelas was in Spain's gazetteers until Puerto Rico was ceded by Spain in the aftermath of the Spanish–American War under the terms of the Treaty of Paris of 1898 and became an unincorporated territory of the United States. In 1899, the United States Department of War conducted a census of Puerto Rico finding that the population of Amuelas barrio was 1,010.

Historical population
Census	Pop.	Note	%±
1900	1,010		—
1910	1,243		23.1%
1920	1,138		−8.4%
1930	1,555		36.6%
1940	1,824		17.3%
1950	1,089		−40.3%
1960	1,010		−7.3%
1970	0		−100.0%
1980	1,851		—
1990	2,836		53.2%
2000	4,056		43.0%
2010	4,575		12.8%
U.S. Decennial Census; 1899 (shown as 1900) 1910-1930; 1930-1950 1980-2000 2010

== See also ==
- List of communities in Puerto Rico
