= Guayabal, Juana Díaz, Puerto Rico =

Barrio of Puerto Rico

Guayabal
- Barrio
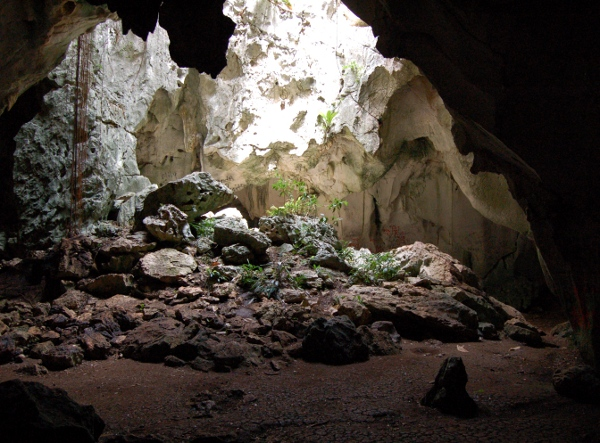
- Cueva Lucero in Guayabal

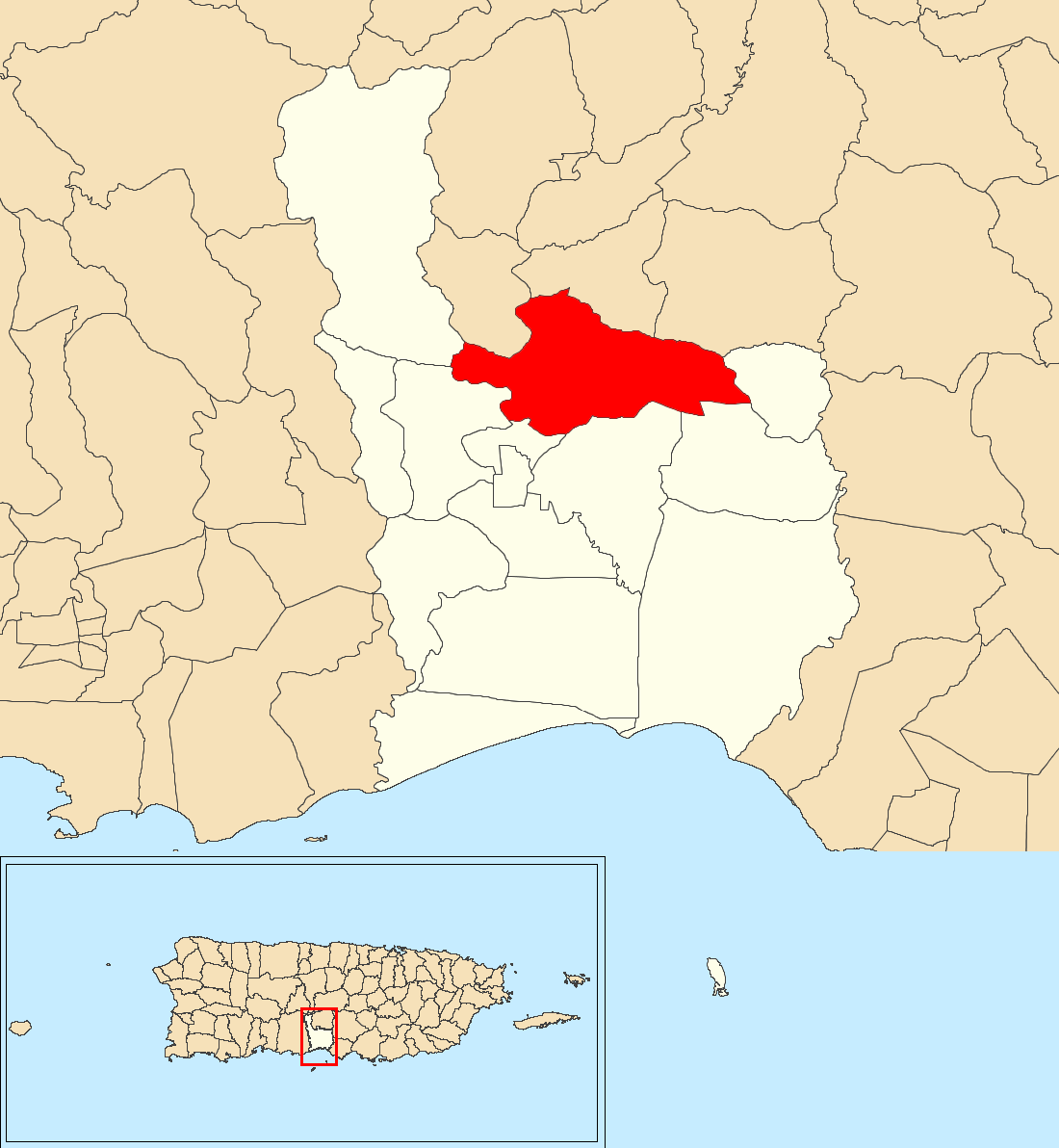
- Location of Guayabal within the municipality of Juana Díaz shown in red

- Location of Puerto Rico
- Coordinates: 18°04′52″N 66°28′23″W
- Commonwealth: Puerto Rico
- Municipality: Juana Díaz

Area
  - Total: 6.07 sq mi (15.7 km^{2})
  - Land: 5.89 sq mi (15.3 km^{2})
  - Water: 0.18 sq mi (0.47 km^{2})
- Elevation: 417 ft (127 m)

Population (2010)
  - Total: 5,835
  - Density: 990.7/sq mi (382.5/km^{2})
- Source: 2010 Census
- Time zone: UTC−4 (AST)
- Postal code: 00795
- Area code: 787/939

Guayabal is a barrio in the municipality of Juana Díaz, Puerto Rico. Its population in 2010 was 5,835.

== History ==
Guayabal was in Spain's gazetteers until Puerto Rico was ceded by Spain in the aftermath of the Spanish–American War under the terms of the Treaty of Paris of 1898 and became an unincorporated territory of the United States. In 1899, the United States Department of War conducted a census of Puerto Rico finding that the population of Guayabal barrio was 2,034.

Historical population
Census	Pop.	Note	%±
1900	2,034		—
1910	2,610		28.3%
1920	2,937		12.5%
1930	2,553		−13.1%
1940	2,823		10.6%
1950	3,609		27.8%
1960	4,226		17.1%
1970	5,130		21.4%
1980	5,662		10.4%
1990	5,755		1.6%
2000	5,774		0.3%
2010	5,835		1.1%
U.S. Decennial Census; 1899 (shown as 1900) 1910-1930; 1930-1950 1980-2000 2010

== Features ==
Cueva Lucero is an archeological site located in Guayabal.

== See also ==
- List of communities in Puerto Rico
