= Capitanejo, Juana Díaz, Puerto Rico =

Barrio of Puerto Rico

Capitanejo
- Barrio
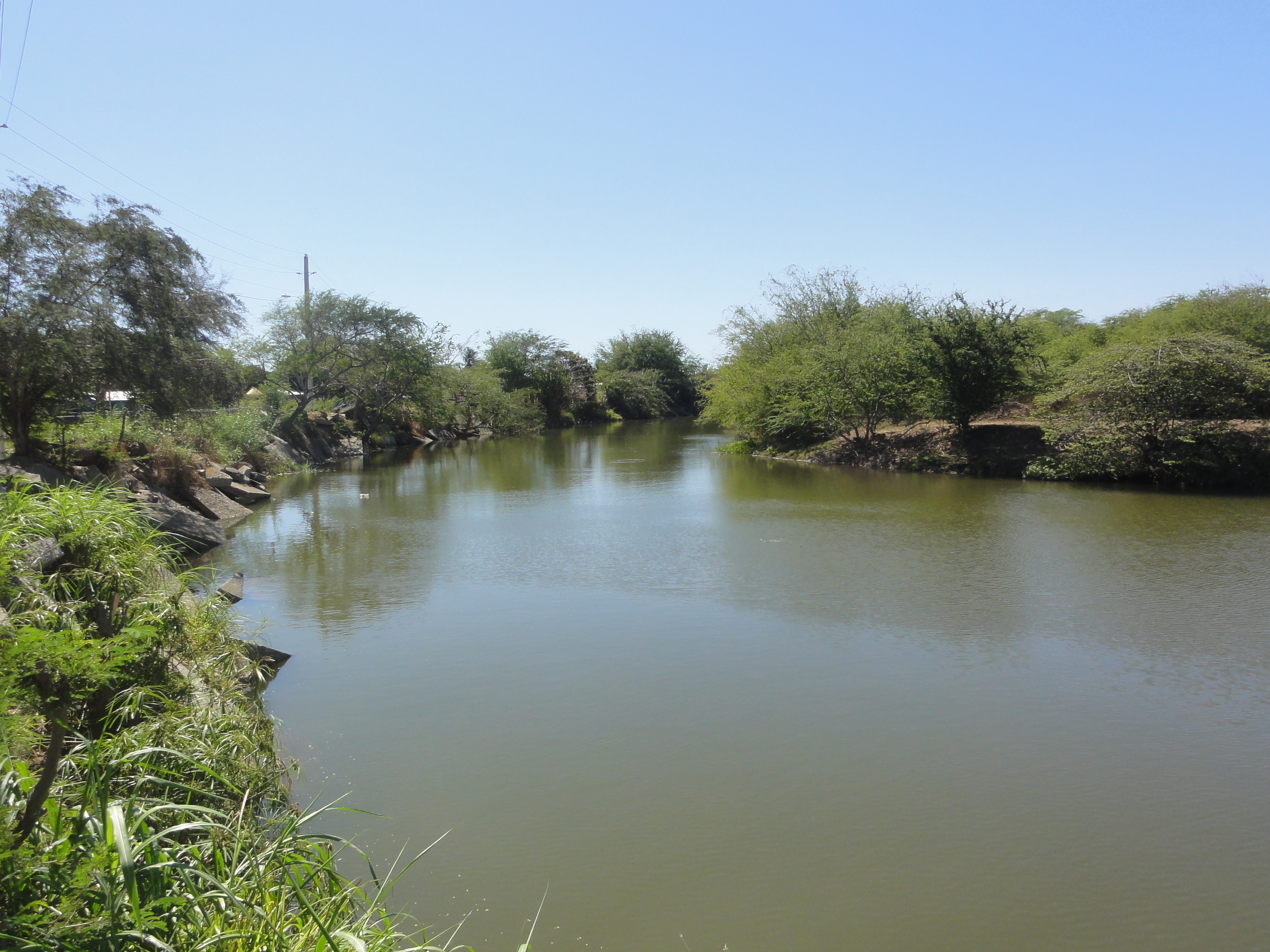
- Jacaguas River in Capitanejo barrio

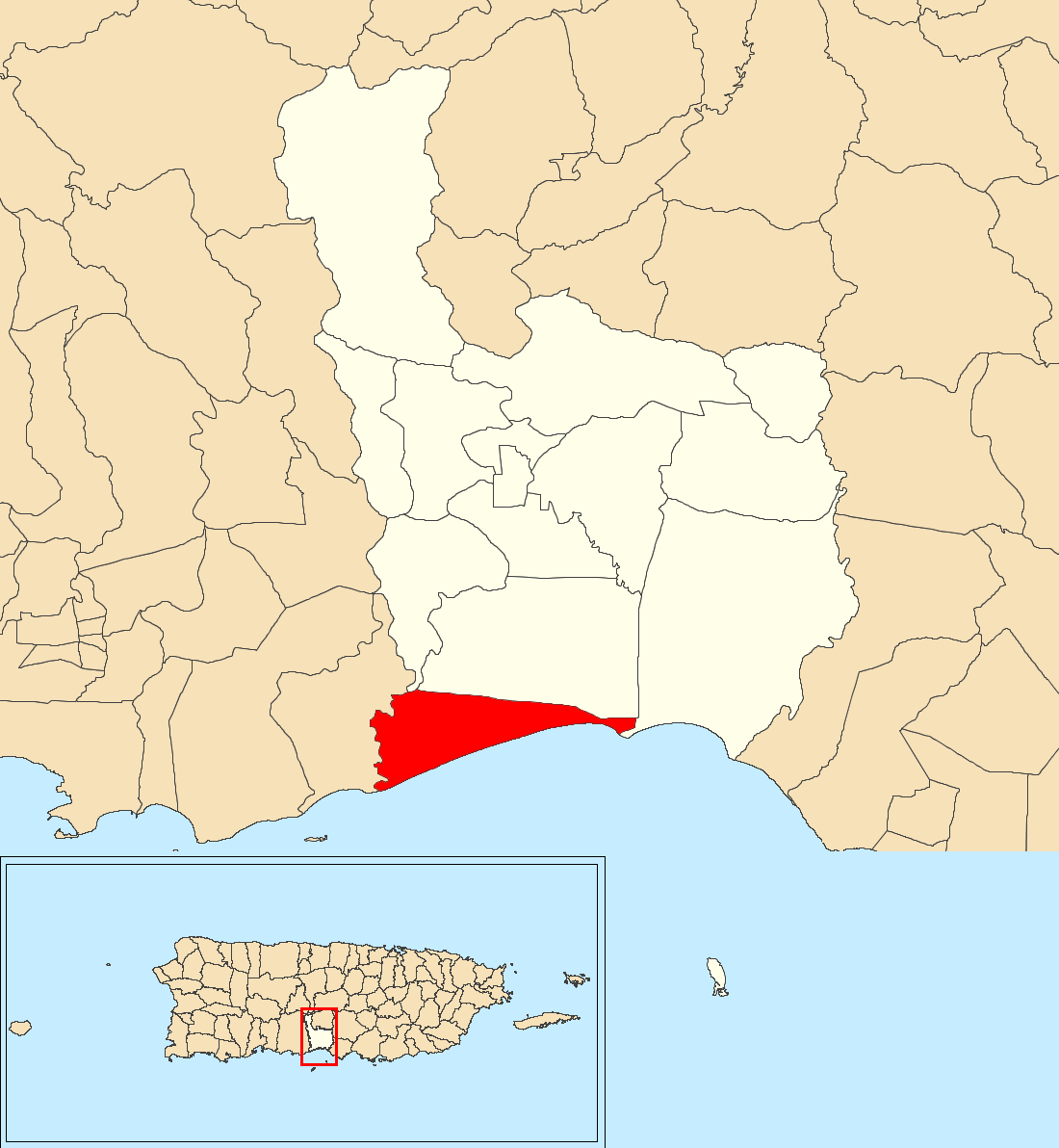
- Location of Capitanejo within the municipality of Juana Díaz shown in red

- Location of Puerto Rico
- Coordinates: 17°58′31″N 66°32′13″W
- Commonwealth: Puerto Rico
- Municipality: Juana Díaz

Area
  - Total: 18.36 sq mi (47.6 km^{2})
  - Land: 15.15 sq mi (39.2 km^{2})
  - Water: 3.21 sq mi (8.3 km^{2})
- Elevation: 0 ft (0 m)

Population (2010)
  - Total: 4,350
  - Density: 1,355.1/sq mi (523.2/km^{2})
- Source: 2010 Census
- Time zone: UTC−4 (AST)
- Postal code: 00795
- Area code: 787/939

Capitanejo is a barrio in the municipality of Juana Díaz, Puerto Rico. Its population in 2010 was 4,350.

== History ==
Capitanejo was in Spain's gazetteers until Puerto Rico was ceded by Spain in the aftermath of the Spanish–American War under the terms of the Treaty of Paris of 1898 and became an unincorporated territory of the United States. In 1899, the United States Department of War conducted a census of Puerto Rico finding that the population of Capitanejo barrio was 1,338.

Historical population
Census	Pop.	Note	%±
1900	1,338		—
1910	1,678		25.4%
1920	1,616		−3.7%
1930	2,128		31.7%
1940	2,955		38.9%
1950	4,451		50.6%
1960	4,996		12.2%
1970	5,935		18.8%
1980	5,572		−6.1%
1990	5,661		1.6%
2000	5,328		−5.9%
2010	4,350		−18.4%
U.S. Decennial Census; 1899 (shown as 1900) 1910-1930; 1930-1950 1980-2000 2010

== See also ==
- List of communities in Puerto Rico
