= Puerto Rico Highway 151 =

Highway in Puerto Rico

Highway 151
- Ruta 151

Route information
- Maintained by Puerto Rico DTPW
- Length: 12.6 km (7.8 mi)
- Existed: 1953–present

Major junctions
- South end: PR-150 in Villalba barrio-pueblo–Hato Puerco Arriba
- PR-561 in Hato Puerco Arriba; PR-562 in Hato Puerco Arriba; PR-553 in Hato Puerco Arriba–Caonillas Arriba; PR-565 in Caonillas Arriba–Hato Puerco Arriba; PR-559 in Hato Puerco Arriba–Caonillas Arriba
- North end: PR-143 in Caonillas Arriba

Location
- Country: United States
- Territory: Puerto Rico
- Municipalities: Villalba

Highway system
- Roads in Puerto Rico; List
← PR-150	→ PR-152

Puerto Rico Highway 151 (PR-151) is a rural road located in the municipality of Villalba, Puerto Rico. This highway begins at PR-150 in downtown Villalba and ends at PR-143 in Caonillas Arriba.

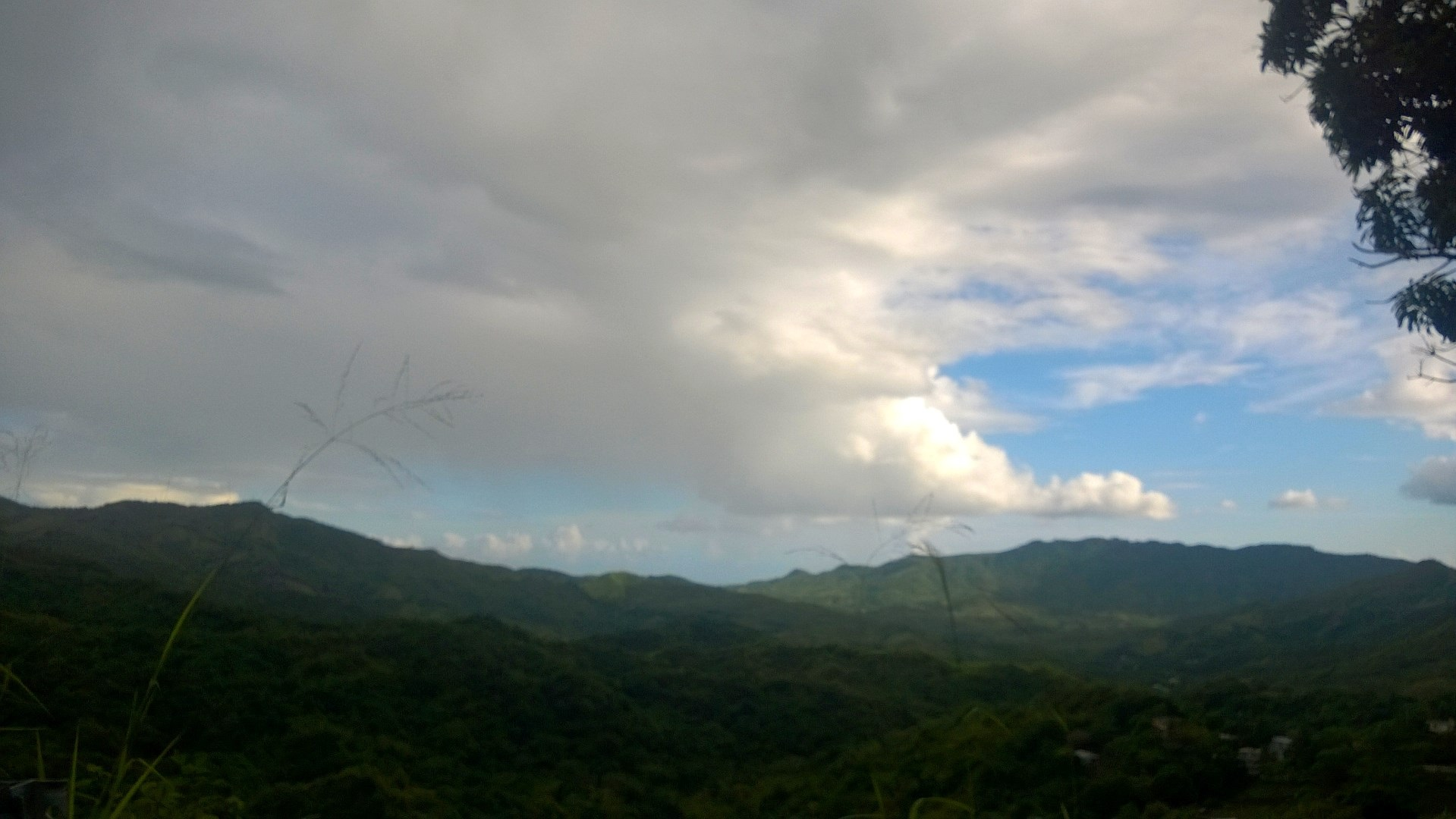
View of mountains from Puerto Rico Highway 151 in Caonillas Arriba

== Major intersections ==
The entire route is located in Villalba.

Location	km	mi	Destinations	Notes
Villalba barrio-pueblo–Hato Puerco Arriba line	0.0	0.0	PR-150 – Villalba, Coamo	Southern terminus of PR-151
Hato Puerco Arriba	0.8	0.50	PR-561 – Vacas	
Hato Puerco Arriba	3.3	2.1	PR-562 – Hato Puerco Arriba	
Hato Puerco Arriba–Caonillas Arriba line	5.2	3.2	PR-553 – Caonillas Arriba	
Hato Puerco Arriba–Caonillas Arriba line	9.0– 9.1	5.6– 5.7	PR-565 – Hato Puerco Arriba	
Hato Puerco Arriba–Caonillas Arriba line	9.2	5.7	PR-559 – Caonillas Arriba	
Caonillas Arriba	12.6	7.8	PR-143 (Ruta Panorámica) – Adjuntas, Barranquitas	Northern terminus of PR-151
1.000 mi = 1.609 km; 1.000 km = 0.621 mi

== See also ==
- 1953 Puerto Rico highway renumbering
