= List of barrios and sectors of Villalba, Puerto Rico =

Like all municipalities of Puerto Rico, Villalba is subdivided into administrative units called barrios, which are, in contemporary times, roughly comparable to minor civil divisions, (and means wards or boroughs or neighborhoods in English). The barrios and subbarrios, in turn, are further subdivided into smaller local populated place areas/units called sectores (sectors in English). The types of sectores may vary, from normally sector to urbanización to reparto to barriada to residencial, among others. Some sectors appear in two barrios.

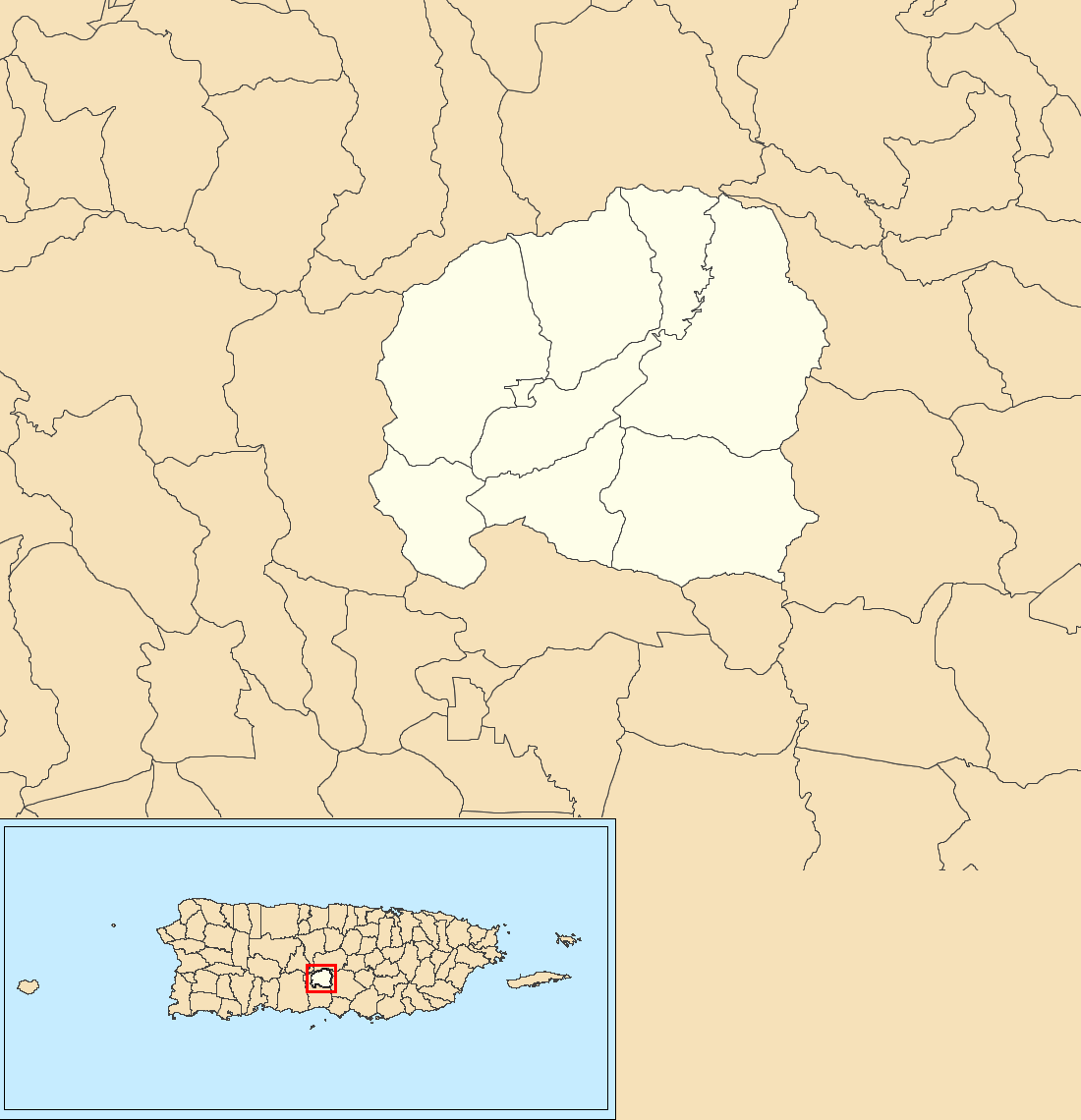
Villalba map with barrio subdivisions

== List of sectors by barrio ==
=== Caonillas Abajo ===
- Carretera 150
- Hoyito Santiago
- Sector Cerro Gordo
- Sector El Higuero
- Sector La Vega

=== Caonillas Arriba ===
- Carretera 151 (intersection with Carretera 553)
- Sector San Miguel
- Sector Caonillas
- Sector Dajaos
- Sector El Limón
- Sector La Ortiga

=== Hato Puerco Abajo ===
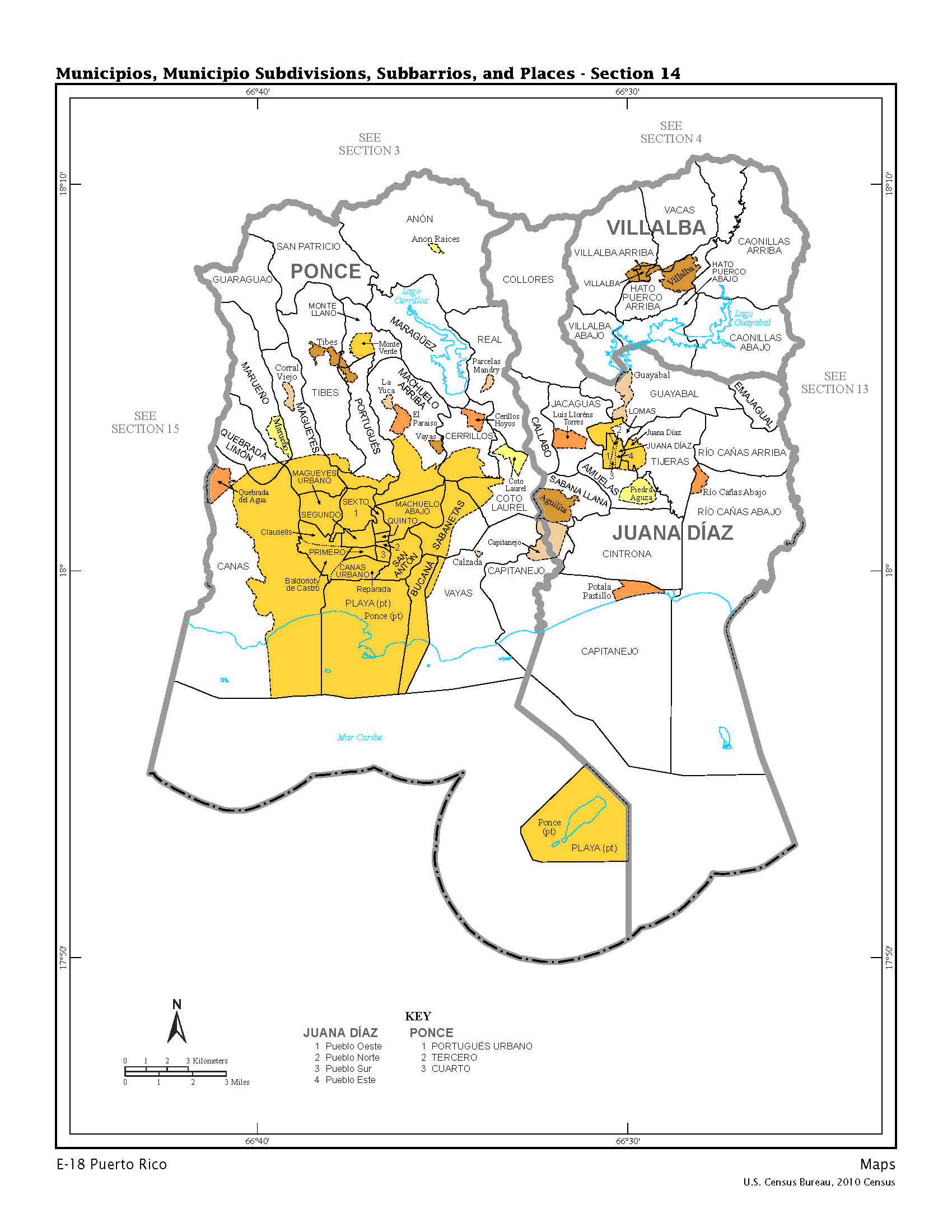
US 2010 Census map of subdivisions of Villalba, and neighboring Ponce and Juana Díaz

- Camarones Abajo
- El Lago
- Jovitos Sur
- La Ferretería
- La Gallera
- Sector Hatillo Viejo
- Urbanización Estancias de Santa Rosa

=== Hato Puerco Arriba ===
- 1ra. Extensión Alturas de Villalba
- 2da. Extensión Alturas de Villalba
- Carretera 150
- Carretera 151 (intersection with Carretera 550)
- Carretera 560
- Carretera 561
- Comunidad Toa Vaca
- Egida Villalba Elderly Apartments
- Jovitos
- Sector Apeaderos
- Sector Camarones
- Sector El Nuevo Pino
- Sector Los Pinos
- Urbanización La Vega
- Urbanización Monte Bello
- Urbanización Portales del Alba

=== Vacas ===
- Carretera 561
- El Mayoral Apartments
- La Pulga
- Sector Hacienda El Mayoral
- Sector La Sierra
- Sector Mogote
- Sector Vacas
- Sector Vista Alegre
- Urbanización Estancias del Mayoral
- Urbanización Estancias del Mayoral II
- Urbanización Luceros de Villalba
- Urbanización Vista Alegre

=== Villalba Abajo ===
- Barriada Borinquen
- Carretera 149 (intersection with Carretera 514)
- Carretera 149
- Corillo
- Égida Villalba Housing for the Elderly
- El Semil Abajo
- Hacienda Juanita
- Hogar Las Margaritas Dos
- Residencial Efraín Suárez
- Residencial Enudio Negrón
- Residencial Maximino Miranda
- Sector Hacienda Sosa
- Sector Jagueyes Abajo
- Sector Jagueyes Arriba
- Sector Romero
- Sector Tierra Santa
- Urbanización Estancias de Valle Hermoso
- Urbanización Las Alondras
- Urbanización Nabori
- Urbanización Quintas del Alba
- Urbanización Sagrado Corazón
- Urbanización Tierra Santa
- Urbanización Valle Escondido
- Urbanización Valle Hermoso
- Urbanización Villa Laura
- Urbanización Vista Bella
- Villalba Apartments

=== Villalba Arriba ===
- Carretera 149
- Carretera 547
- Sector Aceituna
- Sector Chichón
- Sector El Cercao
- Sector Hacienda El Semil Arriba
- Sector La Capilla
- Sector Lajita
- Sector Palmarejo
- Urbanización Alturas del Alba

=== Villalba barrio-pueblo ===
- Barriada Cooperativa
- Barriada Nueva
- Calle Barceló
- Calle Figueroa
- Calle Luchetti
- Calle Muñoz Rivera
- Calle Sharton
- Calle Vencebil
- Calle Walter Mck Jones
- Carretera 149
- El Coquí
- Hogar San Cristobal
- Sector Barrio Chino
- Sector Palmarejo
- Urbanización Villa Alba

== See also ==
- List of communities in Puerto Rico
