= Hato Puerco Abajo =

Barrio of Villalba, Puerto Rico

- Barrio
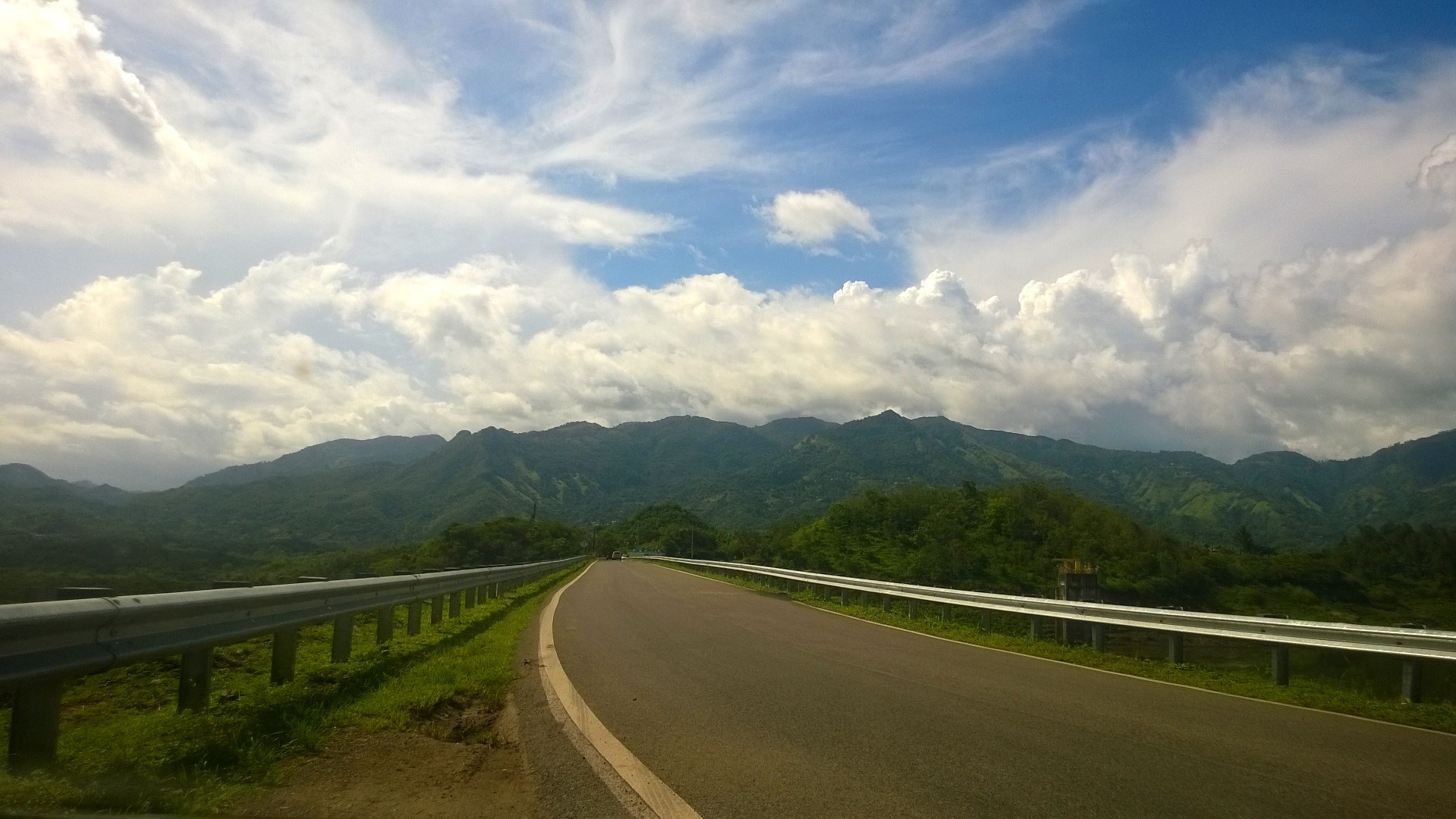
- Puerto Rico Highway 150 in Hato Puerco Abajo

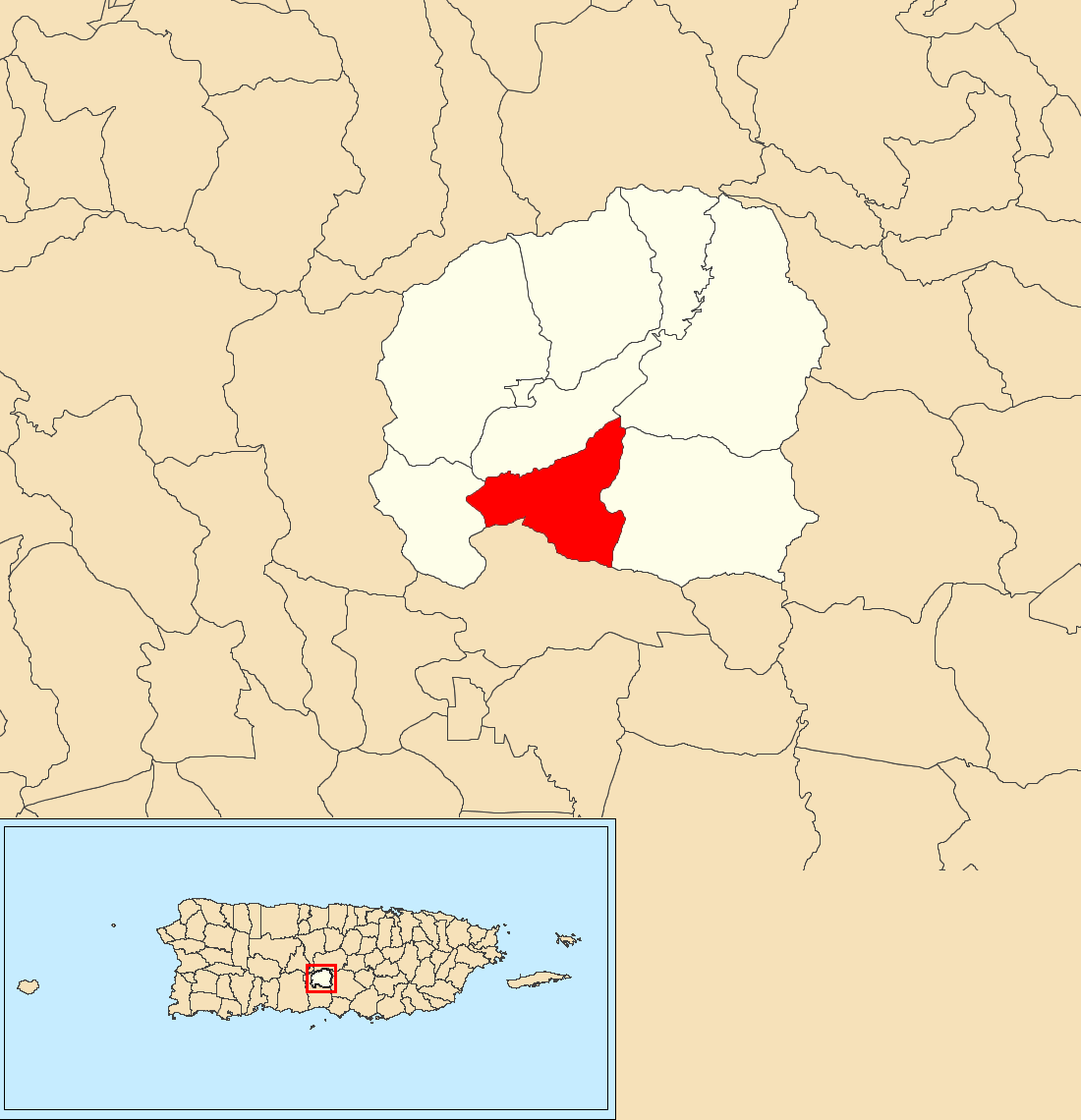
- Location of Hato Puerco Abajo within the municipality of Villalba shown in red

- Location of Puerto Rico
- Coordinates: 18°05′55″N 66°29′06″W
- Commonwealth: Puerto Rico
- Municipality: Villalba

Area
  - Total: 3.03 sq mi (7.8 km^{2})
  - Land: 2.32 sq mi (6.0 km^{2})
  - Water: 0.71 sq mi (1.8 km^{2})
- Elevation: 538 ft (164 m)

Population (2010)
  - Total: 1,764
  - Density: 760.3/sq mi (293.6/km^{2})
- Source: 2010 Census
- Time zone: UTC−4 (AST)
- ZIP Code: 00766
- Area code: 787/939

Hato Puerco is a barrio in the municipality of Villalba, Puerto Rico. Its population in 2010 was 1,764.

== History ==
Hato Puerco Abajo was in Spain's gazetteers until Puerto Rico was ceded by Spain in the aftermath of the Spanish–American War under the terms of the Treaty of Paris of 1898 and became an unincorporated territory of the United States. In 1899, the United States Department of War conducted a census of Puerto Rico finding that the population of Hato Puerco Abajo barrio was 991.

Historical population
Census	Pop.	Note	%±
1900	991		—
1910	965		−2.6%
1920	873		−9.5%
1930	773		−11.5%
1940	949		22.8%
1950	901		−5.1%
1960	800		−11.2%
1970	1,135		41.9%
1980	934		−17.7%
1990	1,438		54.0%
2000	1,911		32.9%
2010	1,764		−7.7%
U.S. Decennial Census; 1899 (shown as 1900) 1910-1930; 1930-1950 1980-2000 2010

== Sectors ==
Barrios (which are, in contemporary times, roughly comparable to minor civil divisions) in turn are further subdivided into smaller local populated place areas/units called sectores (sectors in English). The types of sectores may vary, from normally sector to urbanización to reparto to barriada to residencial, among others.

The following sectors are in Hato Puerco Abajo barrio:

Camarones Abajo, El Lago, Jovitos Sur, La Ferretería, La Gallera, Sector Hatillo Viejo, and Urbanización Estancias de Santa Rosa.

== See also ==
- List of communities in Puerto Rico
- List of barrios and sectors of Villalba, Puerto Rico
