= Puerto Rico Highway 150 =

Highway in Puerto Rico

Highway 150
- Ruta 150

Route information
- Maintained by Puerto Rico DTPW
- Length: 21.7 km (13.5 mi)
- Existed: 1953–present

Major junctions
- West end: PR-149R in Villalba barrio-pueblo
- PR-151 in Villalba barrio-pueblo–Hato Puerco Arriba; PR-560 in Hato Puerco Arriba; PR-5561 in Hato Puerco Arriba; PR-5519 in Caonillas Abajo; PR-5520 in Caonillas Abajo; PR-1150 in Santa Catalina; PR-553 in Santa Catalina; PR-545 in Santa Catalina; PR-5559 in Santa Catalina; PR-138 in Santa Catalina
- East end: PR-14 in Coamo barrio-pueblo

Location
- Country: United States
- Territory: Puerto Rico
- Municipalities: Villalba, Coamo

Highway system
- Roads in Puerto Rico; List
← PR-149	→ PR-151

Puerto Rico Highway 150 (PR-150) is a road that travels from Villalba, Puerto Rico to Coamo. This highway begins at PR-149 in downtown Villalba and ends at PR-14 in downtown Coamo.

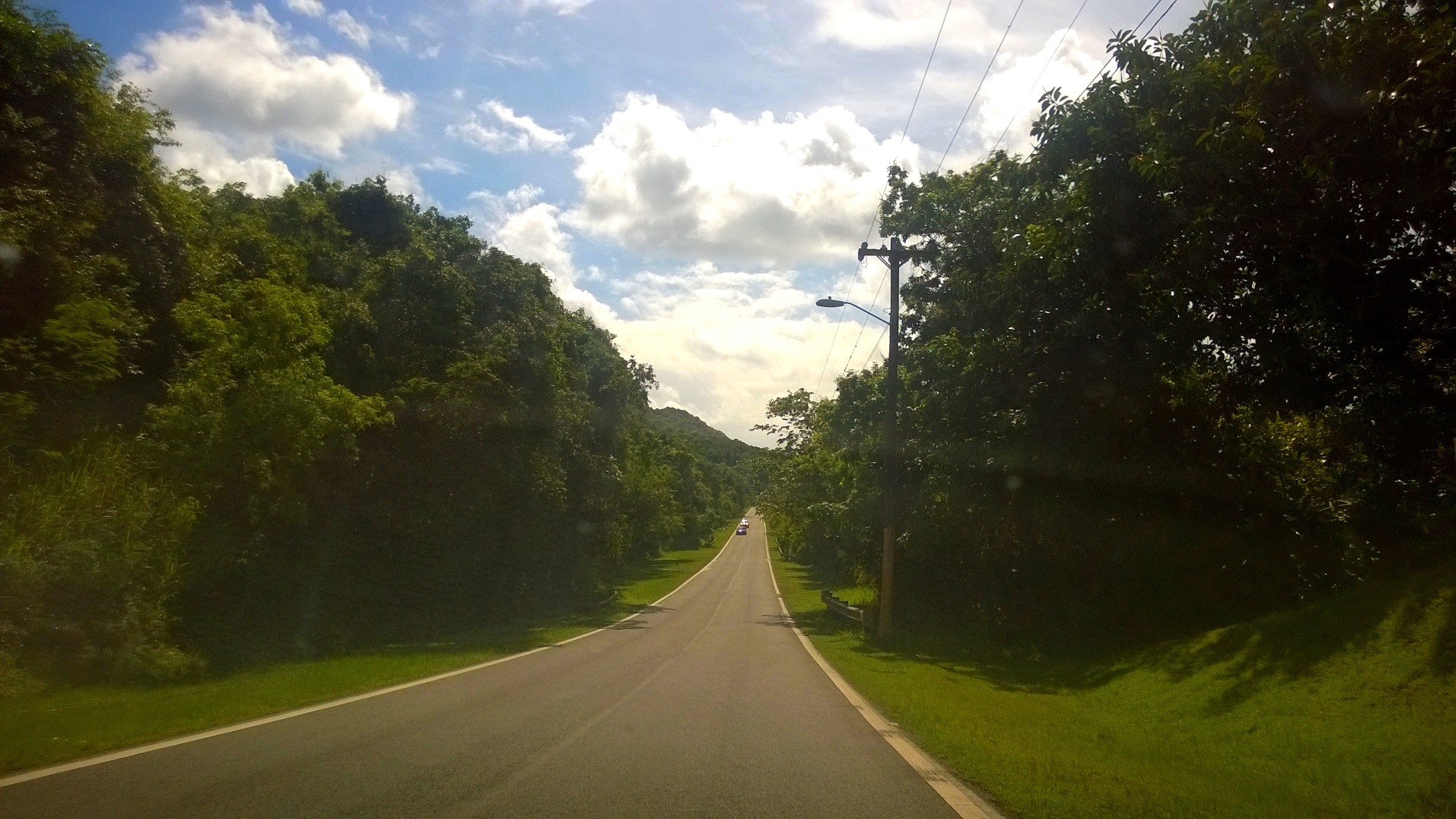
Puerto Rico Highway 150 in Villalba

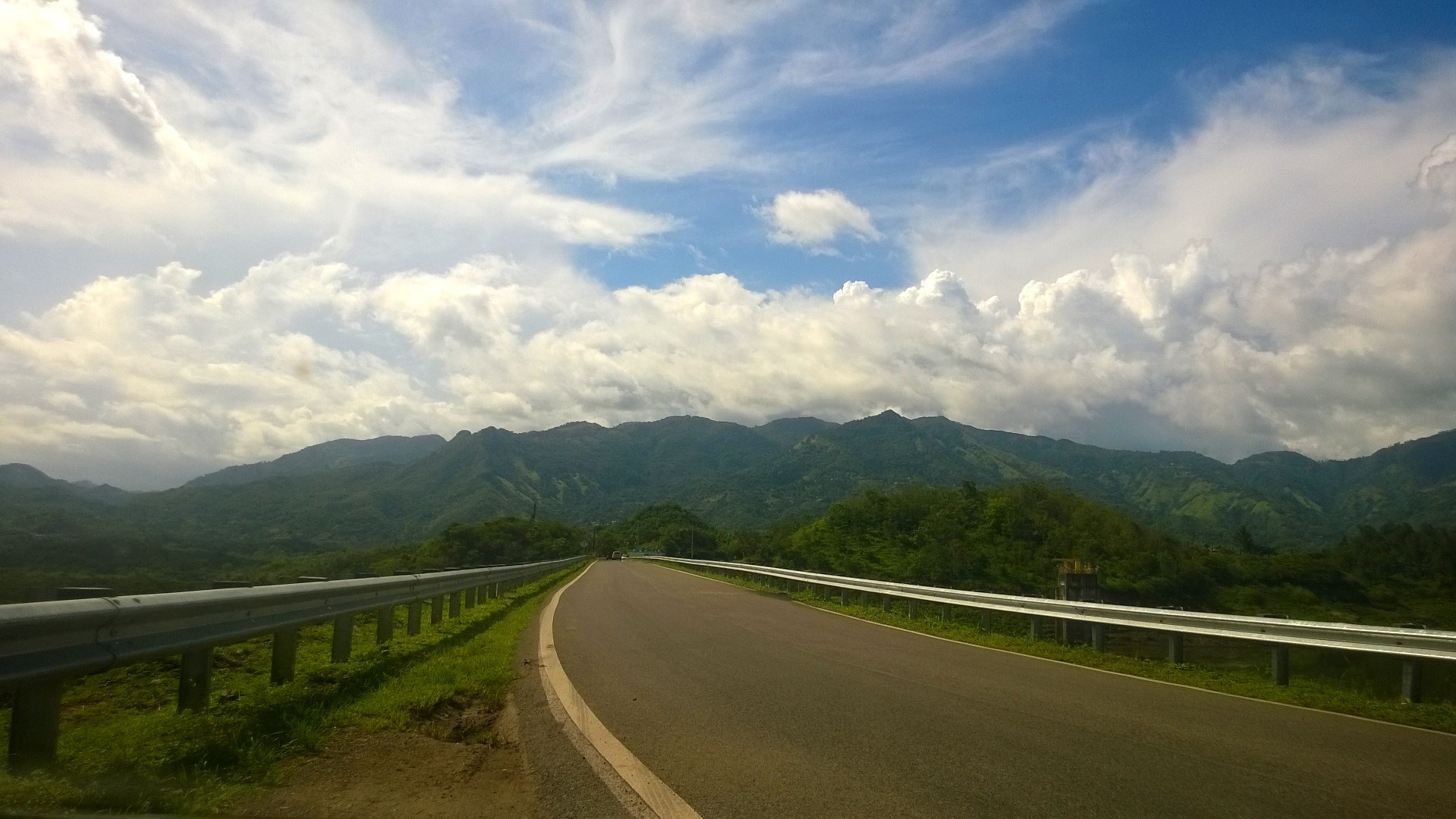
Puerto Rico Highway 150 in Toa Vaca Dam

== Major intersections ==
Municipality	Location	km	mi	Destinations	Notes
Villalba	Villalba barrio-pueblo	0.0	0.0	PR-149R – Juana Díaz, Ciales	Western terminus of PR-150
Villalba	Villalba barrio-pueblo–Hato Puerco Arriba line	0.3– 0.4	0.19– 0.25	PR-151 north (Calle Walter McJones) – Orocovis	
Villalba	Hato Puerco Arriba	0.6– 0.7	0.37– 0.43	PR-560 – Hato Puerco Arriba	
Villalba	Hato Puerco Arriba	1.9	1.2	PR-5561 (Carretera Gregorio Durán Vélez) – Juana Díaz	Partial cloverleaf interchange
Villalba	Caonillas Abajo	9.9	6.2	PR-5519 – Caonillas Abajo	
Villalba	Caonillas Abajo	10.2	6.3	PR-5520 – Caonillas Abajo	
Coamo	Santa Catalina	14.5	9.0	PR-1150 – Caonillas Abajo	Unsigned
Coamo	Santa Catalina	15.9	9.9	PR-553 – Santa Catalina	
Coamo	Santa Catalina	16.8	10.4	PR-545 – Los Llanos	
Coamo	Santa Catalina	18.2	11.3	PR-5559 – San Ildefonso	
Coamo	Santa Catalina	20.7	12.9	PR-138 (Avenida Luis Muñoz Marín) – Santa Isabel, Orocovis	
Coamo	Coamo barrio-pueblo	21.7	13.5	PR-14 (Calle José Ignacio Quintón) – Aibonito, Juana Díaz	Eastern terminus of PR-150
1.000 mi = 1.609 km; 1.000 km = 0.621 mi

== See also ==
- 1953 Puerto Rico highway renumbering
