= Walter McJones =

Puerto Rican mayor

Mayor of Villalba
- In office 1917–1919
- Preceded by: Office established

Personal details
- Born: May 22, 1883 Boston, Massachusetts
- Died: January 10, 1944 Washington, D.C.
- Spouse: Helen Buchanan

Walter McJones (born Walter Mc Kown Jones; May 22, 1883 – January 10, 1944) founded the municipality of Villalba in Puerto Rico and was the first Mayor of Villalba between 1917 and 1919.

McJones was born to an upper-middle-class family in Boston, Massachusetts. He studied at St. Mark Selione College, subsequently obtaining a law degree from Harvard Law School.

McJones's family traveled frequently; during one of his visits to the Caribbean he became interested in Puerto Rico. McJones relocated to Puerto Rico, along with two sisters, Mina and Charlotte, circa 1904 on what is now known as Route 10.

McJones's business contacts included Alexander Marvin, an American working for Banco de Ponce at the time, who became his brother-in-law by marrying McJones's sister: Mina. McJones and Marvin together purchased «Hacienda El Semil» in Villalba. Later obtaining an additional 500 acres from the Olivieri family in «El Limón» in ward «Hato Puerco Arriba».

McJones married Helen Buchanan (daughter of James A. Buchanan; a United States Army official who had been assigned to the island as a result of the Spanish–American War of 1898).

He was elected to the House of Representatives of Puerto Rico at the elections 1920 for the Union Party.

Walter McJones, José Ramón Figueroa y Rivera, and José Victor Figueroa are credited, through the Municipal Council appointed by Governor Arthur Yager, for founding the Municipality of Villalba in 1917. McJones also served as the first mayor of Villalba (1917-1919).

A noted figure in the Unionist Party, Jones was a supporter of Puerto Rican Independence

Inscription at Walter McJones burial site located at Hacienda El Limón in Villalba, PR:

"If you can force your heart and nerve and sinew

To serve your turn long after they are gone,

And so hold on when there is nothing in you

Except the Will which says to them: “Hold on”;

Yours is the Earth and everything that’s in it,

And—which is more—you’ll be a Man, my son!"

Excerpt from poem by Rudyard Kipling, 1865 - 1936
