= Caonillas Arriba, Villalba, Puerto Rico =

Barrio of Puerto Rico

Caonillas Arriba
- Barrio
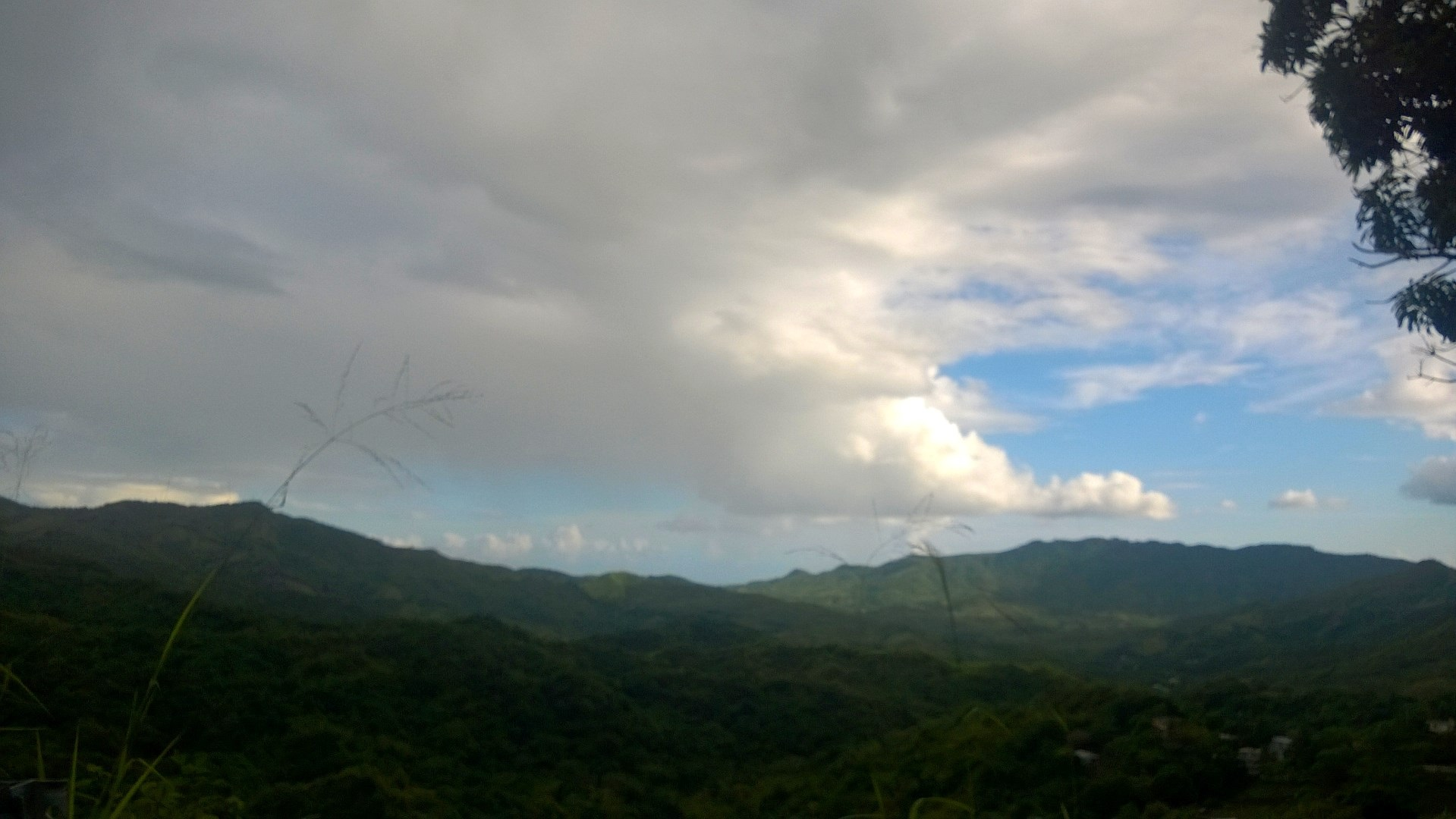
- View of mountains in Caonillas Arriba

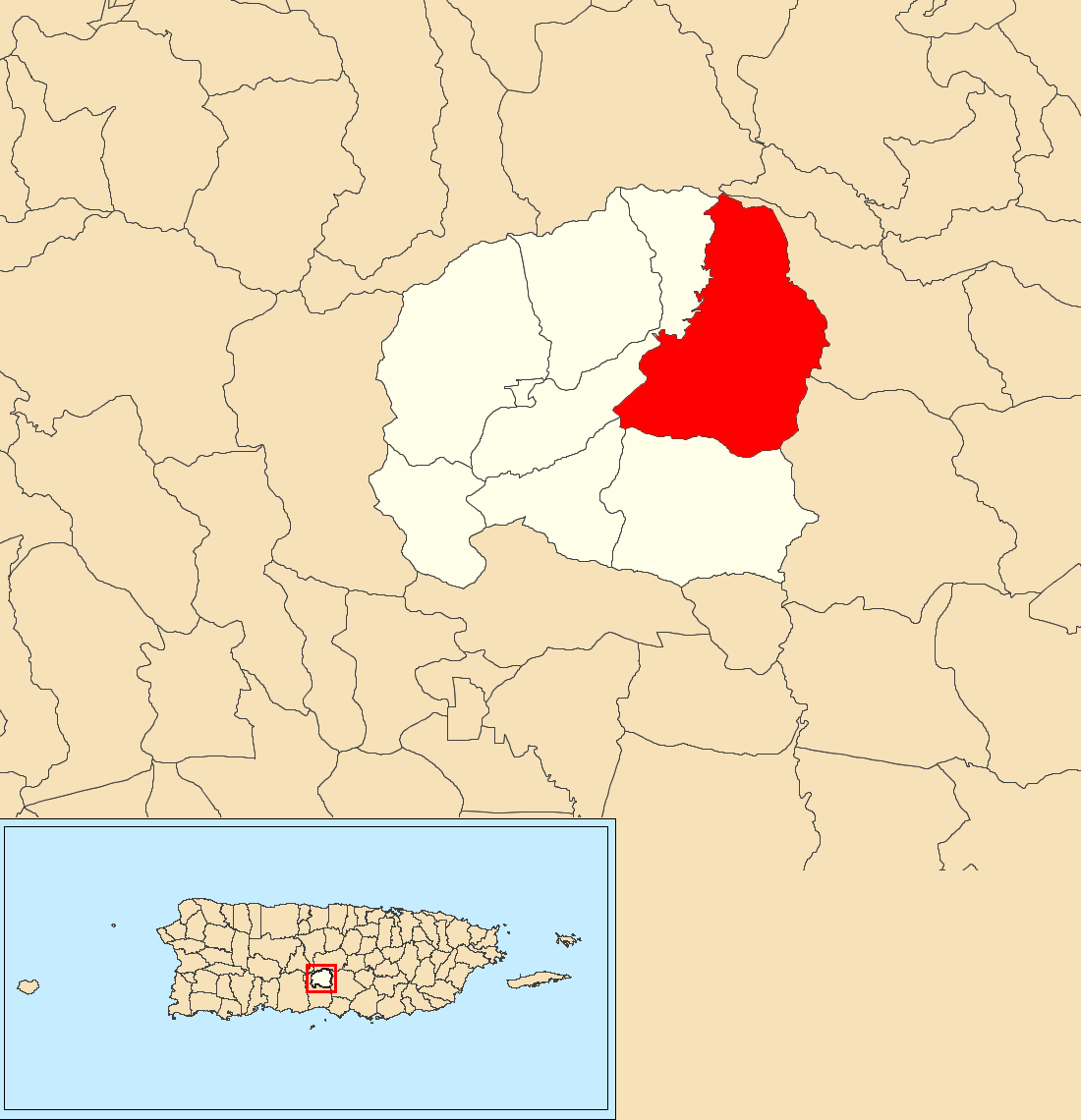
- Location of Caonillas Arriba within the municipality of Villalba shown in red

- Location of Puerto Rico
- Coordinates: 18°08′32″N 66°26′06″W
- Commonwealth: Puerto Rico
- Municipality: Villalba

Area
  - Total: 8.11 sq mi (21.0 km^{2})
  - Land: 8.08 sq mi (20.9 km^{2})
  - Water: 0.03 sq mi (0.078 km^{2})
- Elevation: 1,424 ft (434 m)

Population (2010)
  - Total: 1,537
  - Density: 190.2/sq mi (73.4/km^{2})
- Source: 2010 Census
- Time zone: UTC−4 (AST)
- ZIP Code: 00766
- Area code: 787/939

Caonillas Arriba is a barrio in the municipality of Villalba, Puerto Rico. Its population in 2010 was 1537.

== History ==
Caonillas Arriba was in Spain's gazetteers until Puerto Rico was ceded by Spain in the aftermath of the Spanish–American War under the terms of the Treaty of Paris of 1898 and became an unincorporated territory of the United States. In 1899, the United States Department of War conducted a census of Puerto Rico finding that the population of Caonillas Arriba barrio was 2,200.

Historical population
Census	Pop.	Note	%±
1900	2,200		—
1910	1,627		−26.0%
1920	1,883		15.7%
1930	1,588		−15.7%
1940	1,605		1.1%
1950	1,718		7.0%
1960	1,591		−7.4%
1970	1,778		11.8%
1980	1,473		−17.2%
1990	1,333		−9.5%
2000	1,811		35.9%
2010	1,537		−15.1%
U.S. Decennial Census; 1899 (shown as 1900) 1910-1930; 1930-1950 1980-2000 2010

== Sectors ==
Barrios (which are, in contemporary times, roughly comparable to minor civil divisions) in turn are further subdivided into smaller local populated place areas/units called sectores (sectors in English). The types of sectores may vary, from normally sector to urbanización to reparto to barriada to residencial, among others.

The following sectors are in Caonillas Arriba barrio:

Carretera 151 Intersección 553, La Gallera (Sector San Miguel), Sector Caonillas which includes La Sierrita, La Escuela, Los Aponte, Cubones Norte, El Puente, Caonillas (Ceo Rivera), Finca El Coroco, La Terraza, and El Empalme, Sector Dajaos (La Toyosa, Los Cruz, Carretera 151 Intersección 559), Sector El Limón, (El Palmar, La Hacienda, La Cuesta Limón, Los Santiago, La Escuela, El Hoyito, Los Vázquez, Los Rivera, El Camino Valillo Carretera 151), and Sector La Ortiga (El Pueblito).

As of 2015, La Sierrita has not had regular water service for years. The Federal Emergency Management Agency earmarked money in 2020 to be used for permanent upgrades to water service systems for residents of La Sierrita, among others.

== See also ==
- List of communities in Puerto Rico
- List of barrios and sectors of Villalba, Puerto Rico
