= Cerro El Bolo =

Mountain in Villalba, Puerto Rico

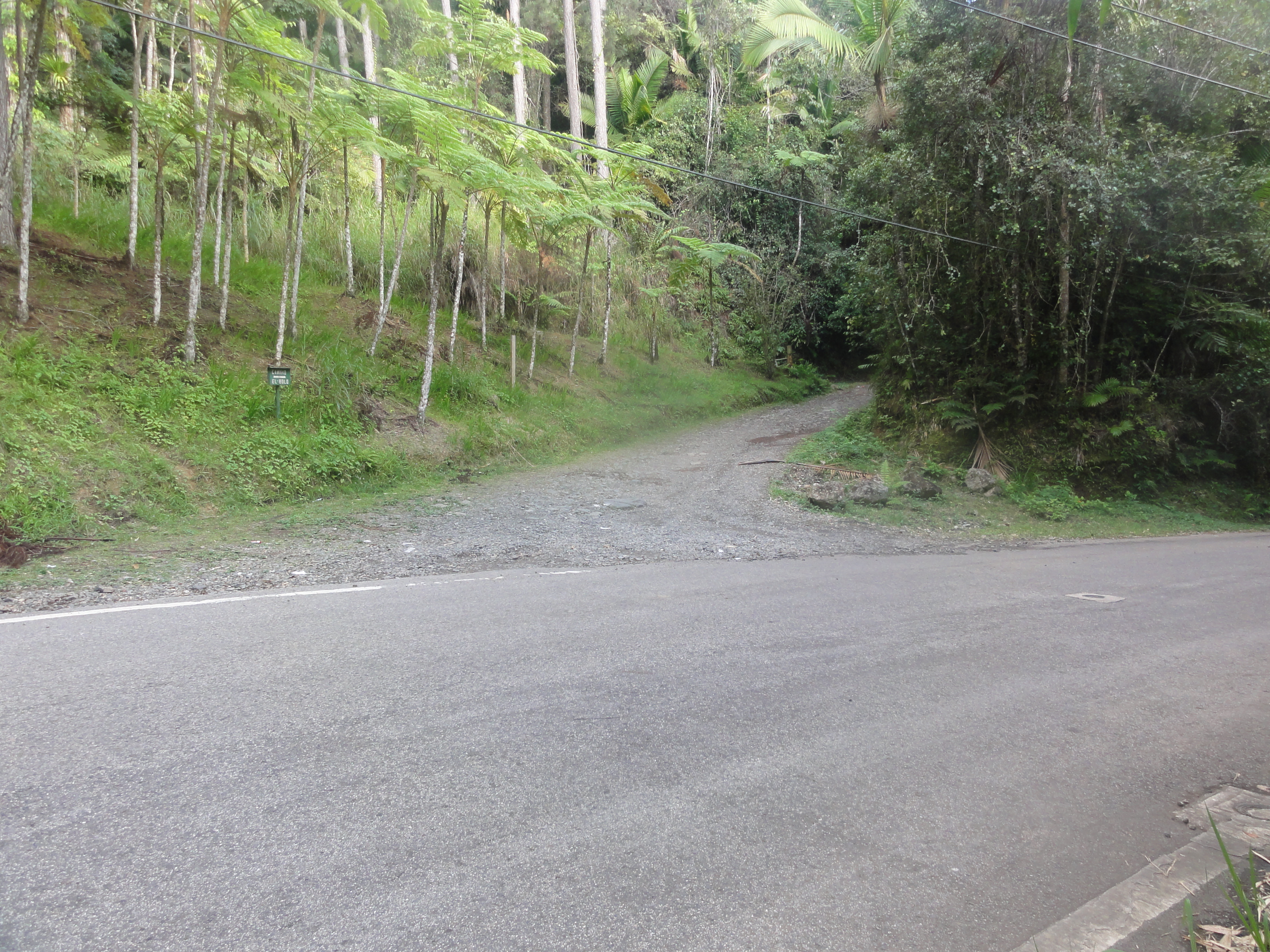
- North entrance of Camino El Bolo trail at PR-143 in Orocovis

Highest point
- Elevation: 1,075 m (3,527 ft)
- Prominence: 1,075 m (3,527 ft)
- Coordinates: 18°10′1.85″N 66°29′13″W

Geography
- Location within Puerto Rico
- Location: Villalba, Puerto Rico
- Parent range: Cordillera Central

Climbing
- Easiest route: Hike

Cerro El Bolo is the highest peak in the municipality of Villalba, Puerto Rico, raising to 1,075 meters (3,527 ft) above sea level. It is part of the Toro Negro State Forest, and is the 10th tallest mountain in Puerto Rico.

== Mountain access and hiking trail ==
The mountain can be reached by following state road PR-143 to km 32.4, where the main entrance of the Toro Negro State Forest is located. Route 143 is part of Puerto Rico's Ruta Panorámica. Route 143 can be accessed via the better-traveled Route 10. From the State Forest's visitors area, Trail #1, known as "Camino El Bolo", makes its way up to Cerro El Bolo.
