= Villalba Abajo =

Barrio of Villalba, Puerto Rico

- Barrio
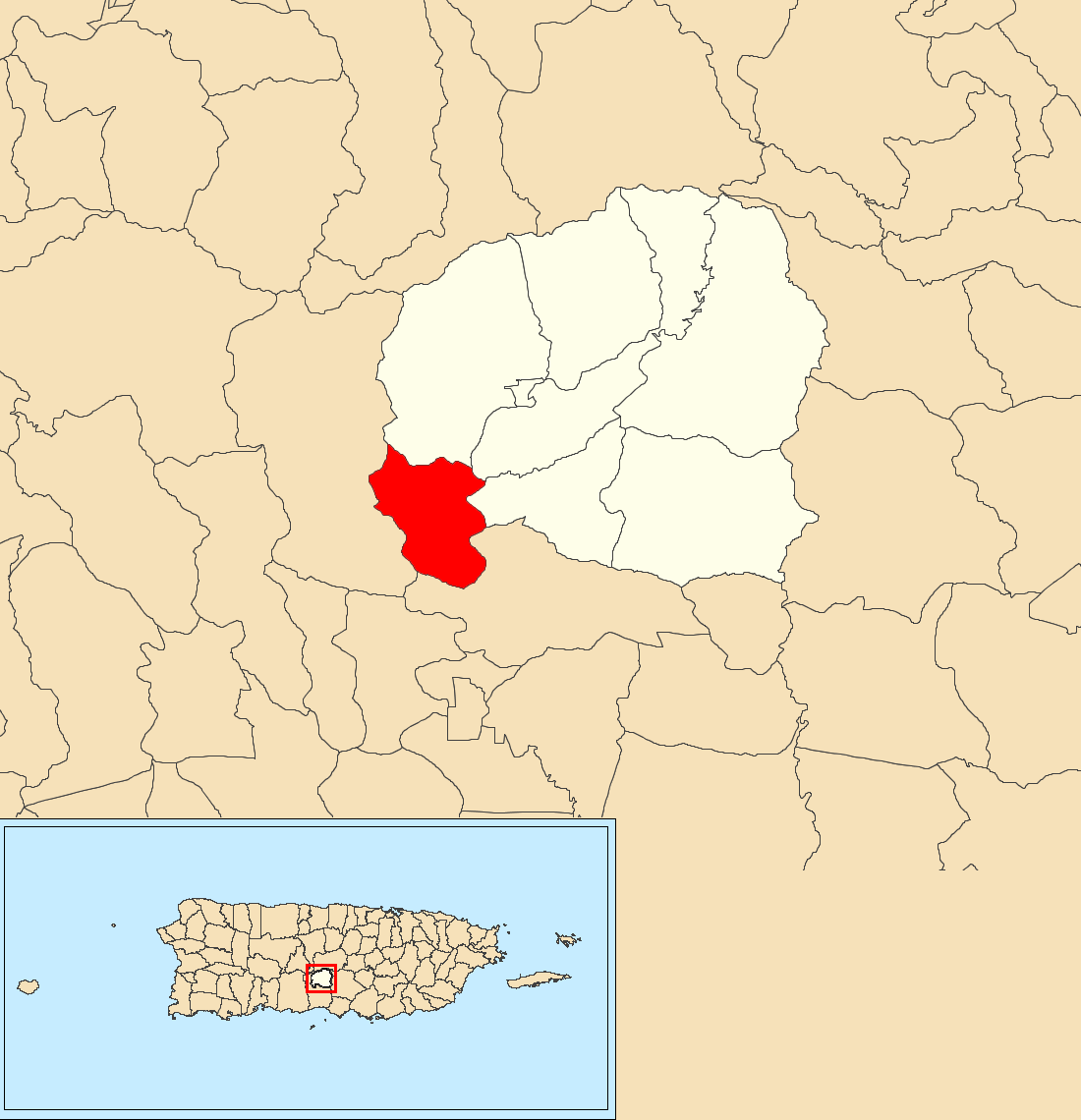
- Location of Villalba Abajo within the municipality of Villalba shown in red

- Location of Puerto Rico
- Coordinates: 18°05′55″N 66°30′44″W
- Commonwealth: Puerto Rico
- Municipality: Villalba

Area
  - Total: 2.73 sq mi (7.1 km^{2})
  - Land: 2.50 sq mi (6.5 km^{2})
  - Water: 0.23 sq mi (0.60 km^{2})
- Elevation: 636 ft (194 m)

Population (2010)
  - Total: 2,880
  - Density: 1,152/sq mi (445/km^{2})
- Source: 2010 Census
- Time zone: UTC−4 (AST)
- ZIP Code: 00766
- Area code: 787/939

Villalba is a barrio in the municipality of Villalba, Puerto Rico. Its population in 2010 was 2,880.

== History ==
Villalba Abajo was in Spain's gazetteers until Puerto Rico was ceded by Spain in the aftermath of the Spanish–American War under the terms of the Treaty of Paris of 1898 and became an unincorporated territory of the United States. In 1899, the United States Department of War conducted a census of Puerto Rico finding that the population of Villalba Abajo barrio was 1,363.

Historical population
Census	Pop.	Note	%±
1900	1,363		—
1910	1,454		6.7%
1920	1,833		26.1%
1930	1,407		−23.2%
1940	1,453		3.3%
1950	1,757		20.9%
1960	2,251		28.1%
1970	2,740		21.7%
1980	2,940		7.3%
1990	2,998		2.0%
2000	3,054		1.9%
2010	2,880		−5.7%
U.S. Decennial Census; 1899 (shown as 1900) 1910-1930; 1930-1950 1980-2000 2010

== Sectors ==
Barrios (which are, in contemporary times, roughly comparable to minor civil divisions) in turn are further subdivided into smaller local populated place areas/units called sectores (sectors in English). The types of sectores may vary, from normally sector to urbanización to reparto to barriada to residencial, among others.

The following sectors are in Villalba Abajo barrio:

Barriada Borinquen, Carretera 149, Corillo, Égida Villalba Housing for the Elderly, El Semil Abajo, Hacienda Juanita, Hogar Las Margaritas Dos, Residencial Efraín Suárez, Residencial Enudio Negrón, Residencial Maximino Miranda, Sector Hacienda Sosa, Sector Jagueyes Abajo (Parcelas Cotorreras, Los Olivieri, La Escuela), Sector Jagueyes Arriba, (Lado Bravo, Los Cabros, Roque), Sector Romero (Las Cumbres, Las Talas Largas, Santo Domingo, El Polvorín, El Trueno, Romero Interior, La Escuela, Los Olivari), Sector Tierra Santa (El Achiote, El Cercao, El Cementerio, El Mamey, Calle Vieja, El Complejo, Los Trotadores), Urbanización Estancias de Valle Hermoso, Urbanización Las Alondras, Urbanización Nabori, Urbanización Quintas del Alba, Urbanización Sagrado Corazón, Urbanización Tierra Santa, Urbanización Valle Escondido, Urbanización Valle Hermoso, Urbanización Villa Laura, Urbanización Vista Bella, and Villalba Apartments.

== See also ==
- List of communities in Puerto Rico
- List of barrios and sectors of Villalba, Puerto Rico
