= Caonillas Abajo, Villalba, Puerto Rico =

Barrio of Puerto Rico

Caonillas Abajo
- Barrio
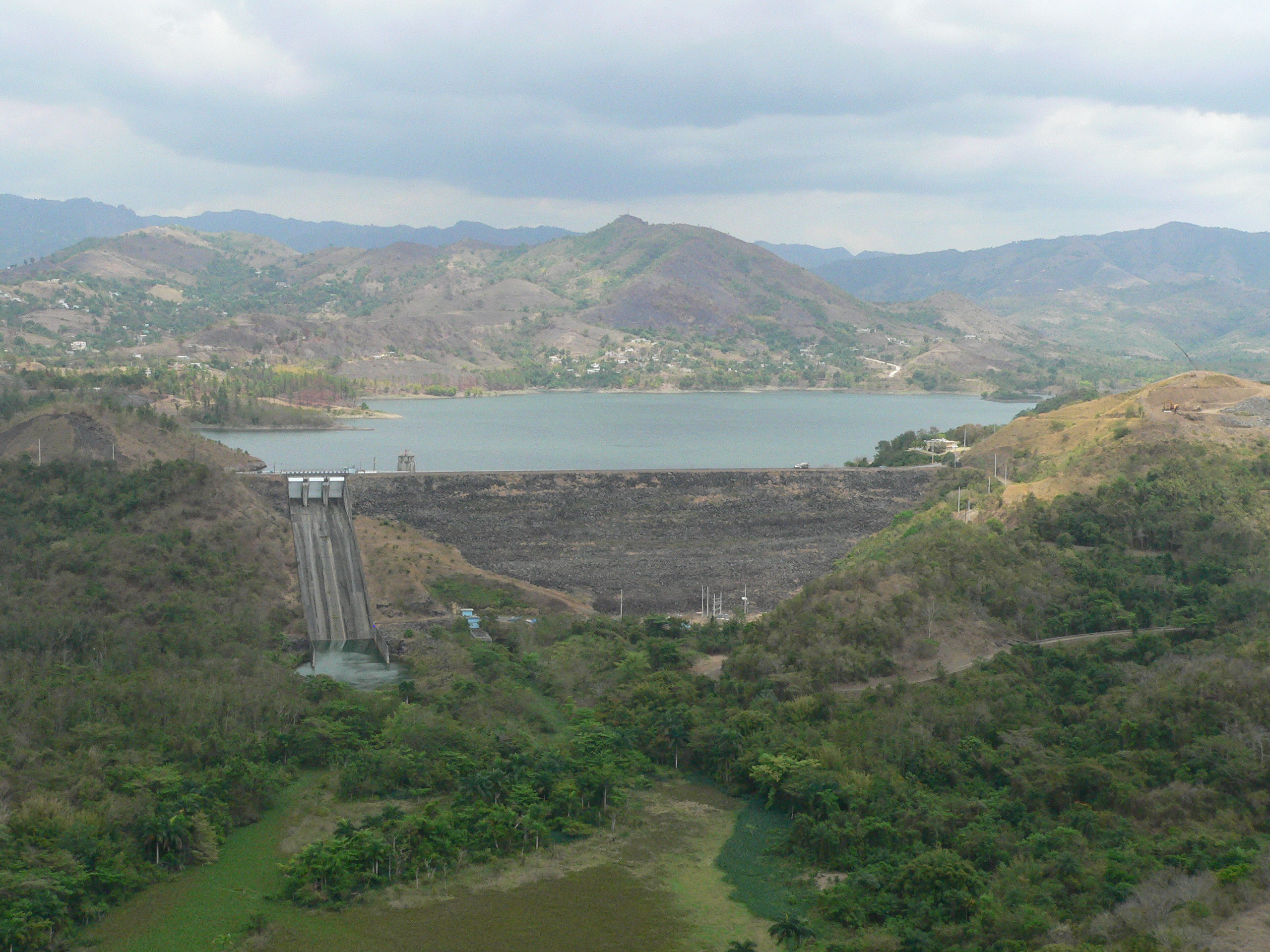
- Lago Toa Vaca

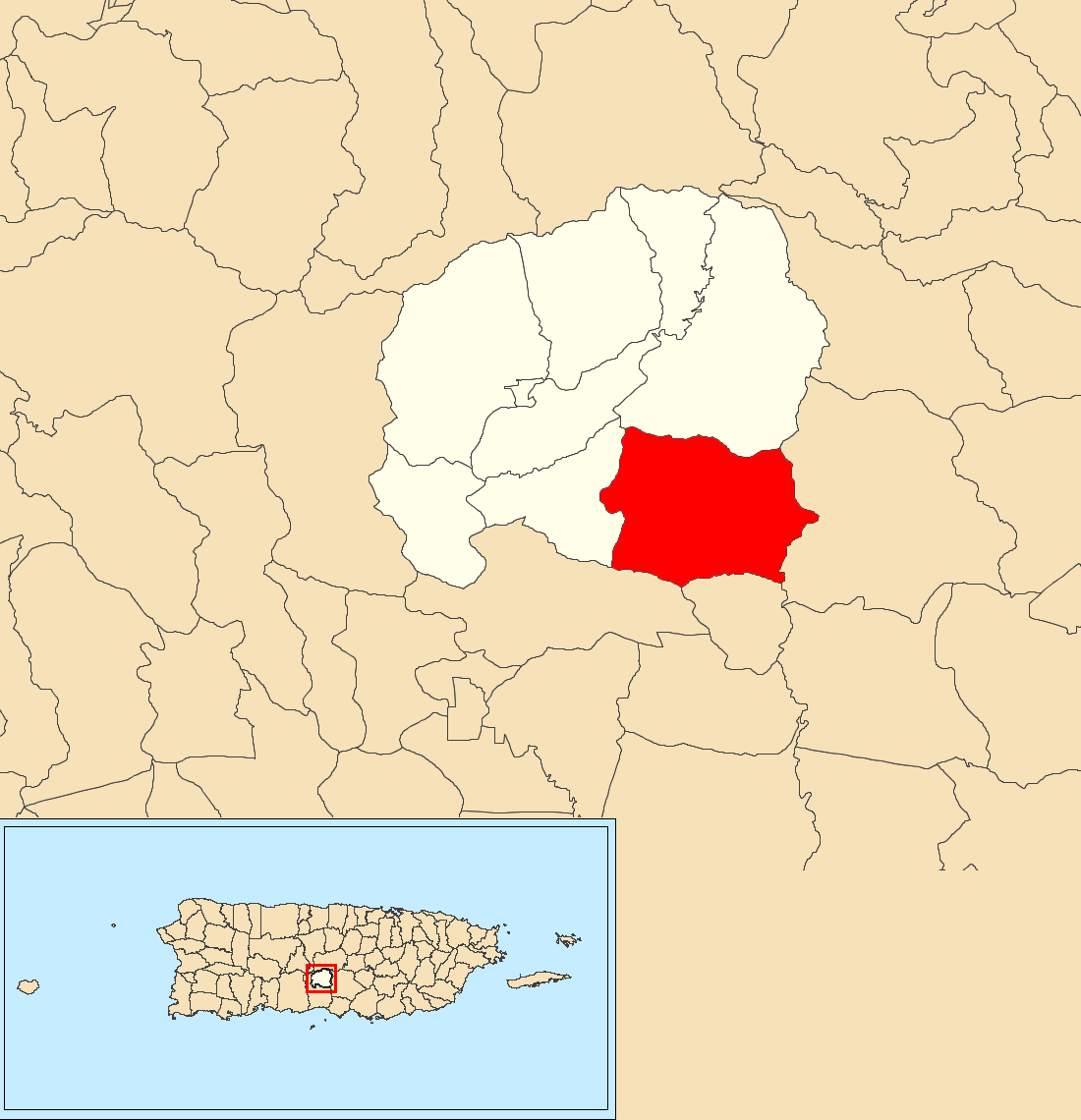
- Location of Caonillas Abajo within the municipality of Villalba shown in red

- Location of Puerto Rico
- Coordinates: 18°06′06″N 66°26′46″W
- Commonwealth: Puerto Rico
- Municipality: Villalba

Area
  - Total: 6.36 sq mi (16.5 km^{2})
  - Land: 5.93 sq mi (15.4 km^{2})
  - Water: 0.43 sq mi (1.1 km^{2})
- Elevation: 663 ft (202 m)

Population (2010)
  - Total: 1,448
  - Density: 244.6/sq mi (94.4/km^{2})
- Source: 2010 Census
- Time zone: UTC−4 (AST)
- ZIP Code: 00766
- Area code: 787/939

Caonillas Abajo is a barrio in the municipality of Villalba, Puerto Rico. Its population in 2010 was 1448.

== History ==
Caonillas Abajo was in Spain's gazetteers until Puerto Rico was ceded by Spain in the aftermath of the Spanish–American War under the terms of the Treaty of Paris of 1898 and became an unincorporated territory of the United States. In 1899, the United States Department of War conducted a census of Puerto Rico finding that the population of Caonillas Abajo barrio was 1,558.

Historical population
| Census | Pop. | Note | %± |
|---|---|---|---|
| 1900 | 1,558 | | — |
| 1910 | 1,800 | | 15.5% |
| 1920 | 1,816 | | 0.9% |
| 1930 | 1,151 | | −36.6% |
| 1940 | 1,235 | | 7.3% |
| 1950 | 917 | | −25.7% |
| 1960 | 1,061 | | 15.7% |
| 1970 | 996 | | −6.1% |
| 1980 | 1,056 | | 6.0% |
| 1990 | 967 | | −8.4% |
| 2000 | 1,427 | | 47.6% |
| 2010 | 1,448 | | 1.5% |
U.S. Decennial Census; 1899 (shown as 1900) 1910-1930; 1930-1950 1980-2000 2010

== Sectors ==
Barrios (which are roughly comparable to minor civil divisions) in turn are further subdivided into smaller local populated place areas/units called sectores (sectors in English). The types of sectores may vary, from normally sector to urbanización to reparto to barriada to residencial, among others.

The following sectors are in Caonillas Abajo barrio:

Carretera 150, Hoyito Santiago, Sector Cerro Gordo, (Cubones Sur, Los Chivos, La Escuela, La Línea, Los Velázquez, El Hoyito Pérez, El Negocio Toño, La Capilla) Sector El Higuero (El Rincón, Lajitas, Villalba, Los Fondos, Palmasola, La Escuela, Las Minas, La Cruz, La Capilla), and Sector La Vega, (Los Laboy, Los Cruz, Caonillas Final).

== Gallery ==
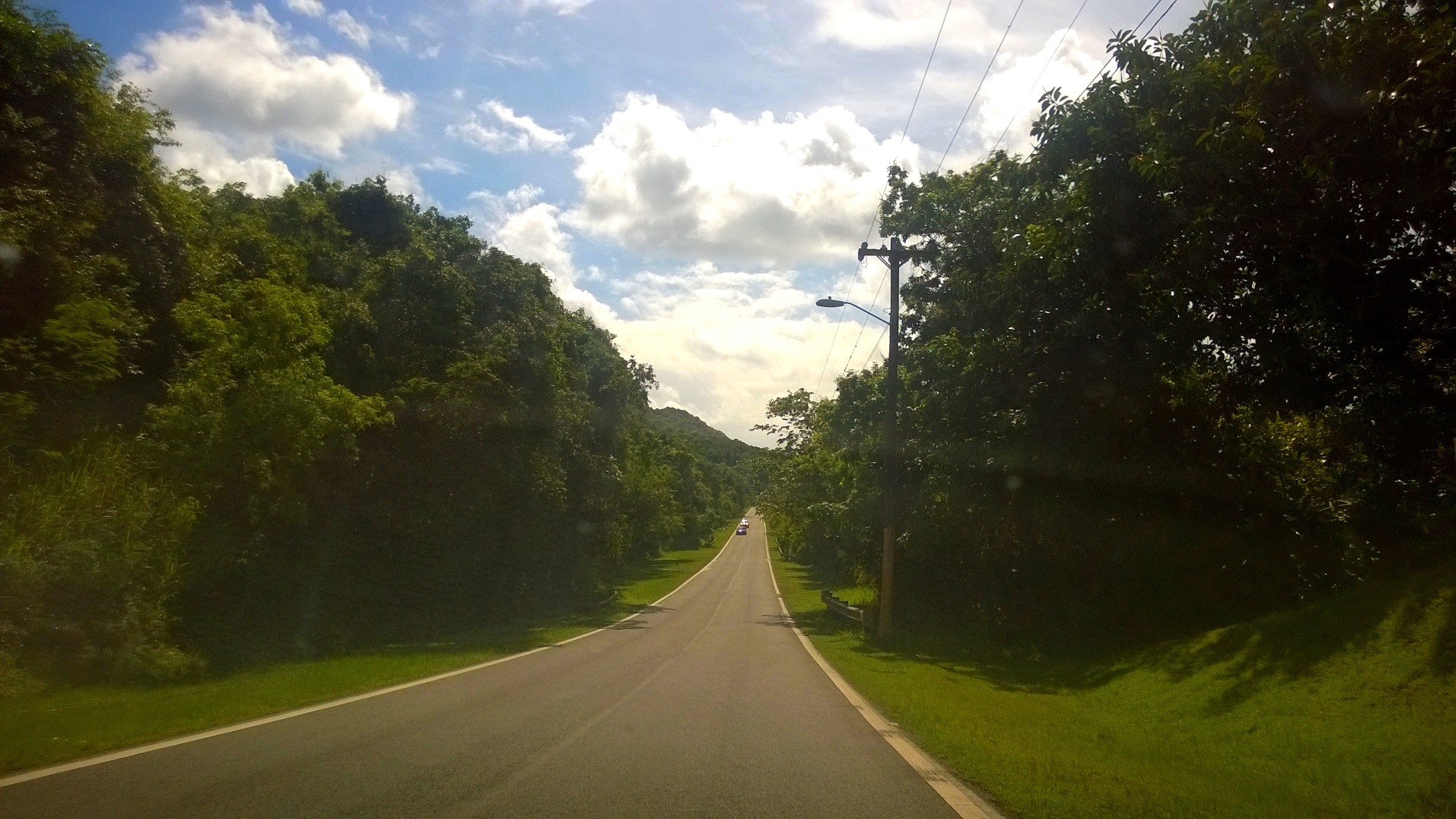
Puerto Rico Highway 150 in Caonillas Abajo

== See also ==
- List of communities in Puerto Rico
- List of barrios and sectors of Villalba, Puerto Rico
