= Villalba Arriba =

Barrio of Villalba, Puerto Rico

- Barrio
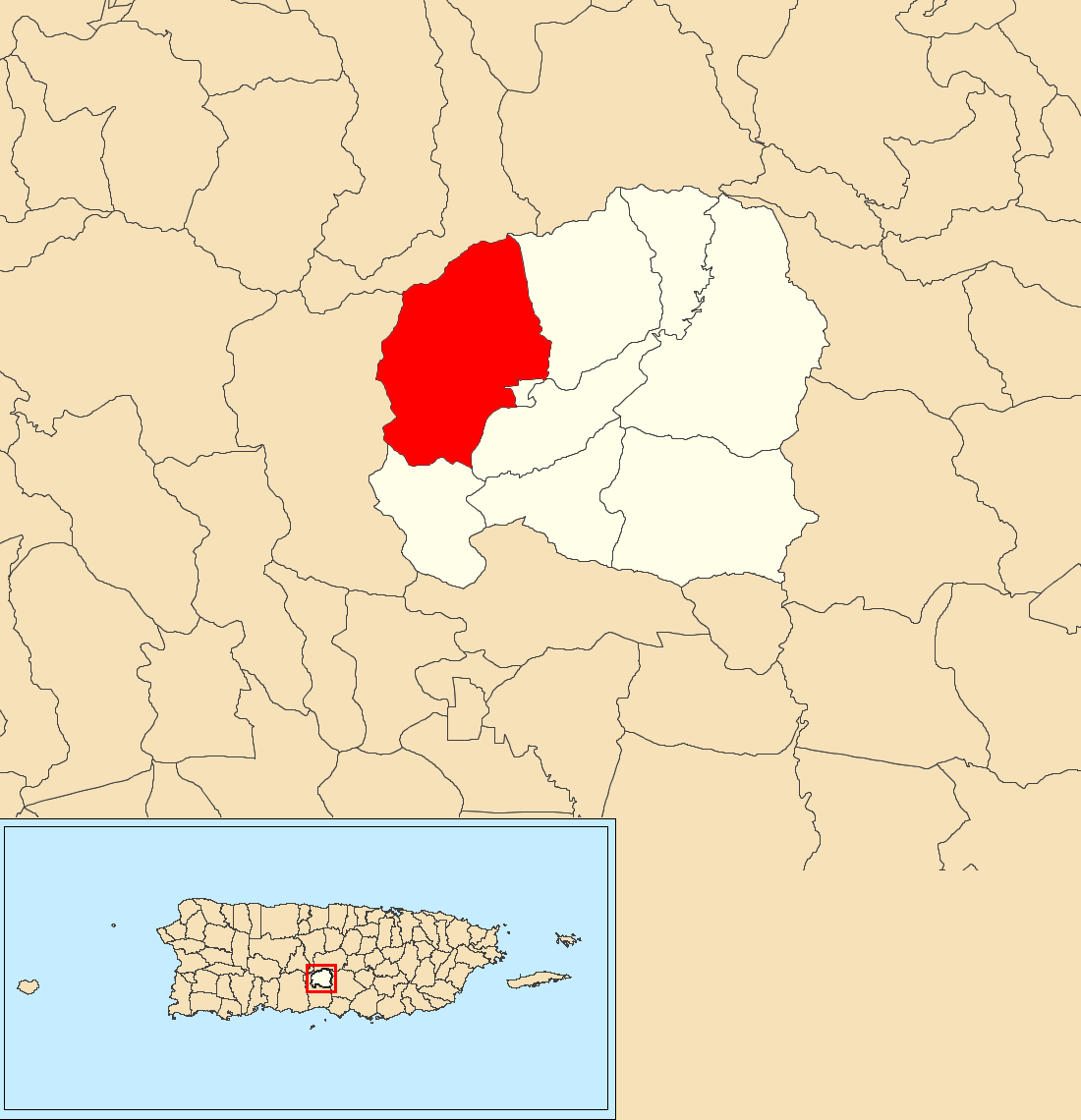
- Location of Villalba Arriba within the municipality of Villalba shown in red

- Location of Puerto Rico
- Coordinates: 18°08′24″N 66°30′24″W
- Commonwealth: Puerto Rico
- Municipality: Villalba

Area
  - Total: 6.81 sq mi (17.6 km^{2})
  - Land: 6.81 sq mi (17.6 km^{2})
  - Water: 0 sq mi (0 km^{2})
- Elevation: 1,539 ft (469 m)

Population (2010)
  - Total: 5,938
  - Density: 872/sq mi (337/km^{2})
- Source: 2010 Census
- Time zone: UTC−4 (AST)
- ZIP Code: 00766
- Area code: 787/939

Villalba Arriba is a barrio in the municipality of Villalba, Puerto Rico. Its population in 2010 was 5,938.

== History ==
Villalba Arriba was in Spain's gazetteers until Puerto Rico was ceded by Spain in the aftermath of the Spanish–American War under the terms of the Treaty of Paris of 1898 and became an unincorporated territory of the United States. In 1899, the United States Department of War conducted a census of Puerto Rico finding that the population of Villalba Arriba barrio was 2,917.

Historical population
Census	Pop.	Note	%±
1900	2,917		—
1910	2,665		−8.6%
1920	2,547		−4.4%
1930	3,728		46.4%
1940	3,299		−11.5%
1950	3,733		13.2%
1960	3,889		4.2%
1970	0		−100.0%
1980	3,708		—
1990	5,792		56.2%
2000	6,552		13.1%
2010	5,938		−9.4%
U.S. Decennial Census; 1899 (shown as 1900) 1910-1930; 1930-1950 1980-2000 2010

== Sectors ==
Barrios (which are, in contemporary times, roughly comparable to minor civil divisions) in turn are further subdivided into smaller local populated place areas/units called sectores (sectors in English). The types of sectores may vary, from normally sector to urbanización to reparto to barriada to residencial, among others.

The following sectors are in Villalba Abrriba barrio:

Carretera 149, Carretera 547, Sector Aceituna, Sector Chichón, Sector El Cercao, Sector Hacienda El Semil Arriba, Sector La Capilla, Sector Lajita, Sector Palmarejo (al norte del pueblo, El Semil Arriba, Las Trozas, La Julita, Cuesta El Pasto, Guindalecia, El Collado, El Hoyo, El Cruce, El Parque, La Escuela, La Gallera, La Lima, Divisoria, La Loma, La Planta), and Urbanización Alturas del Alba.

== See also ==
- List of communities in Puerto Rico
- List of barrios and sectors of Villalba, Puerto Rico
