= Vacas, Villalba, Puerto Rico =

Barrio of Puerto Rico

Vacas
- Barrio
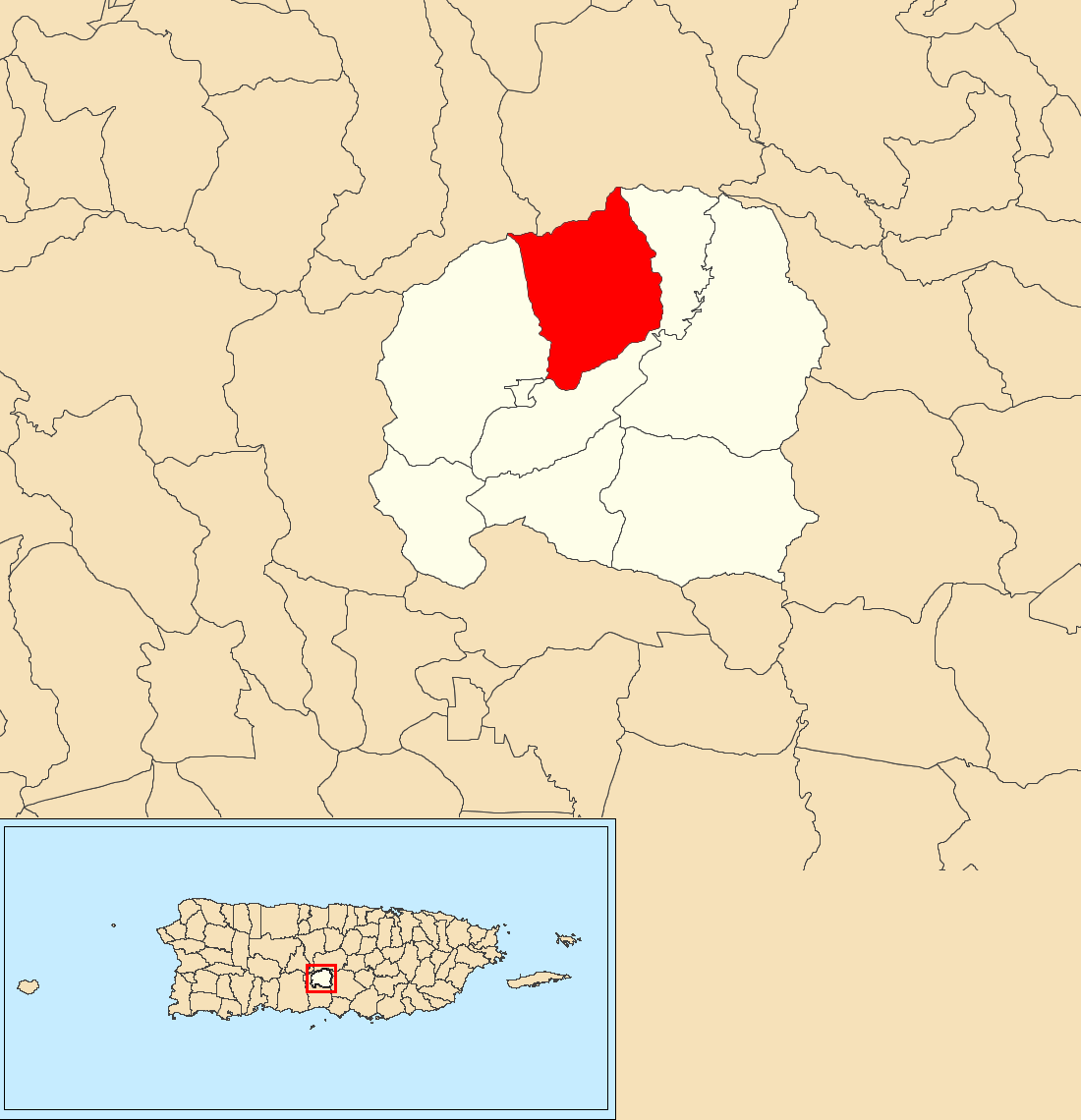
- Location of Vacas within the municipality of Villalba shown in red

- Location of Puerto Rico
- Coordinates: 18°09′12″N 66°28′35″W
- Commonwealth: Puerto Rico
- Municipality: Villalba

Area
  - Total: 4.7 sq mi (12 km^{2})
  - Land: 4.7 sq mi (12 km^{2})
  - Water: 0 sq mi (0 km^{2})
- Elevation: 2,100 ft (640 m)

Population (2010)
  - Total: 4,049
  - Density: 861.5/sq mi (332.6/km^{2})
- Source: 2010 Census
- Time zone: UTC−4 (AST)
- ZIP Code: 00766
- Area code: 787/939

Vacas is a barrio in the municipality of Villalba, Puerto Rico. Its population in 2010 was 4,049.

== History ==
Vacas was in Spain's gazetteers until Puerto Rico was ceded by Spain in the aftermath of the Spanish–American War under the terms of the Treaty of Paris of 1898 and became an unincorporated territory of the United States. In 1899, the United States Department of War conducted a census of Puerto Rico finding that the population of Vacas barrio was 1,841.

During the 2019–20 Puerto Rico earthquakes, three giant rocks ended up coming loose, rolling down a mountain and onto a home and crushed a car, in Vacas barrio.

Historical population
Census	Pop.	Note	%±
1900	1,841		—
1910	1,801		−2.2%
1920	1,963		9.0%
1930	1,755		−10.6%
1940	1,849		5.4%
1950	2,119		14.6%
1960	2,158		1.8%
1970	1,704		−21.0%
1980	1,977		16.0%
1990	1,956		−1.1%
2000	3,196		63.4%
2010	4,049		26.7%
U.S. Decennial Census; 1899 (shown as 1900) 1910-1930; 1930-1950 1980-2000 2010

== Sectors ==
Barrios (which are, in contemporary times, roughly comparable to minor civil divisions) in turn are further subdivided into smaller local populated place areas/units called sectores (sectors in English). The types of sectores may vary, from normally sector to urbanización to reparto to barriada to residencial, among others.

The following sectors are in Vacas barrio:

Carretera 561, El Mayoral Apartments, La Pulga, Sector Hacienda El Mayoral, Sector La Sierra, Sector Mogote (El Frío, El Bolo, El Cucurucho), Sector Vacas, (El Tamarindo, El Parque, El Negocio Chiripo, El Llano), Sector Vista Alegre, Urbanización Estancias del Mayoral II, Urbanización Estancias del Mayoral, Urbanización Luceros de Villalba, and Urbanización Vista Alegre.

== See also ==
- List of communities in Puerto Rico
- List of barrios and sectors of Villalba, Puerto Rico
