= Santa Catalina, Coamo, Puerto Rico =

Barrio of Puerto Rico

Santa Catalina
- Barrio
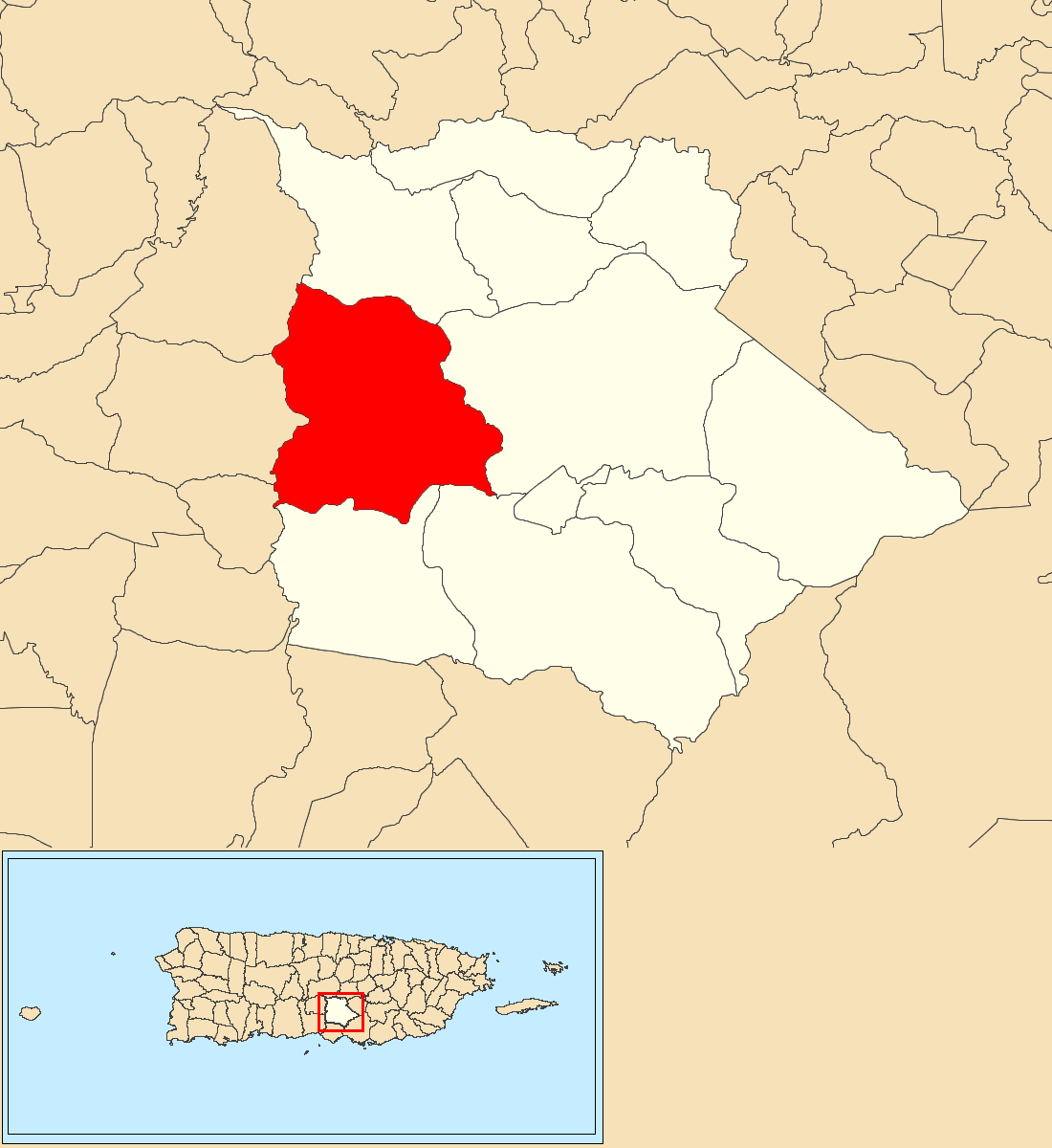
- Location of Santa Catalina within the municipality of Coamo shown in red

- Location of Puerto Rico
- Coordinates: 18°06′04″N 66°24′20″W
- Commonwealth: Puerto Rico
- Municipality: Coamo

Area
  - Total: 10.29 sq mi (26.7 km^{2})
  - Land: 10.29 sq mi (26.7 km^{2})
  - Water: 0 sq mi (0 km^{2})
- Elevation: 935 ft (285 m)

Population (2010)
  - Total: 1,788
  - Density: 173.8/sq mi (67.1/km^{2})
- Source: 2010 Census
- Time zone: UTC−4 (AST)
- ZIP Code: 00769
- Area code: 787/939

Santa Catalina is a barrio in the municipality of Coamo, Puerto Rico. Its population in 2010 was 1,788.

== History ==
Santa Catalina was in Spain's gazetteers until Puerto Rico was ceded by Spain in the aftermath of the Spanish–American War under the terms of the Treaty of Paris of 1898 and became an unincorporated territory of the United States. In 1899, the United States Department of War conducted a census of Puerto Rico finding that the population of Santa Catalina barrio was 1,864.

Historical population
Census	Pop.	Note	%±
1900	1,864		—
1910	2,004		7.5%
1920	2,217		10.6%
1930	2,097		−5.4%
1940	2,170		3.5%
1950	2,026		−6.6%
1960	1,397		−31.0%
1970	1,278		−8.5%
1980	1,545		20.9%
1990	1,464		−5.2%
2000	1,733		18.4%
2010	1,788		3.2%
U.S. Decennial Census; 1899 (shown as 1900) 1910-1930; 1930-1950 1980-2000 2010

== See also ==
- List of communities in Puerto Rico
