= Villalba barrio-pueblo =

Historical and administrative center (seat) of Villalba, Puerto Rico

Villalba barrio-pueblo Pueblo de Villalba
- Municipality Seat
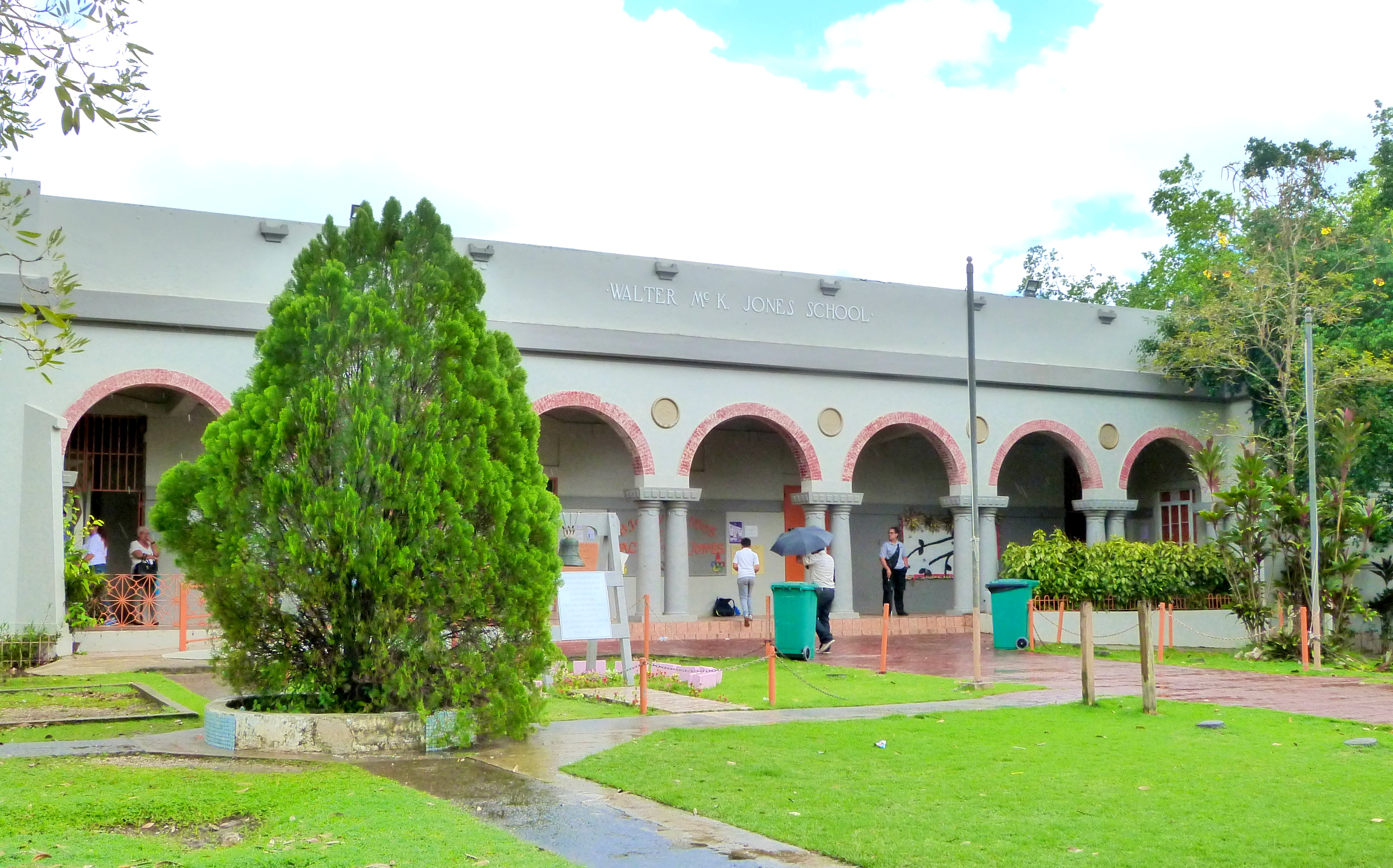
- Walter Mck Jones School in Villalba barrio-pueblo

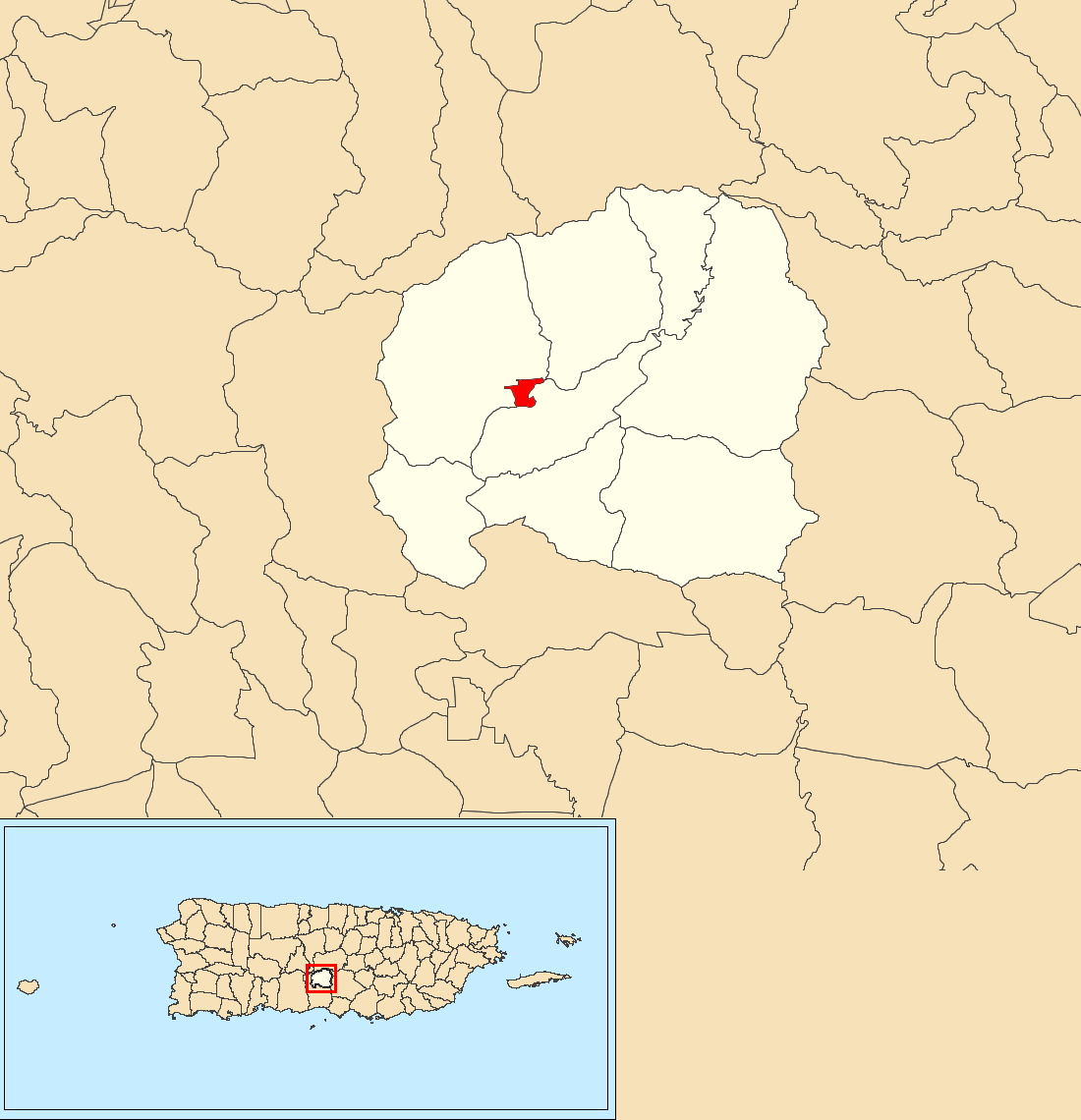
- Location of Villalba barrio-pueblo within the municipality of Villalba shown in red

- Location of Puerto Rico
- Coordinates: 18°07′43″N 66°29′33″W
- Commonwealth: Puerto Rico
- Municipality: Villalba

Area
  - Total: 0.15 sq mi (0.39 km^{2})
  - Land: 0.15 sq mi (0.39 km^{2})
  - Water: 0 sq mi (0 km^{2})
- Elevation: 528 ft (161 m)

Population (2010)
  - Total: 729
  - Density: 4,860/sq mi (1,880/km^{2})
- Source: 2010 Census
- Time zone: UTC−4 (AST)
- ZIP Code: 00766
- Area code: 787/939

Villalba barrio-pueblo is a barrio and the administrative center (seat) of Villalba, a municipality of Puerto Rico. Its population in 2010 was 729.

As was customary in Spain, in Puerto Rico, the municipality has a barrio called pueblo which contains a central plaza, the municipal buildings (city hall), and a Catholic church. Fiestas patronales (patron saint festivals) are held in the central plaza every year.

Historical population
Census	Pop.	Note	%±
1920	626		—
1940	834		—
1950	1,499		79.7%
1960	1,892		26.2%
1970	0		−100.0%
1980	1,666		—
1990	1,108		−33.5%
2000	1,040		−6.1%
2010	729		−29.9%
U.S. Decennial Census; 1899 (shown as 1900) 1910-1930; 1930-1950 1980-2000 2010

== The central plaza and its church ==
The central plaza in Villalba barrio-pueblo is named Plaza de Recreo José Ramón Figueroa, after one of the town founders. The central plaza, or square, is a place for official and unofficial recreational events and a place where people can gather and socialize from dusk to dawn. The Laws of the Indies, Spanish law, which regulated life in Puerto Rico in the early 19th century, stated the plaza's purpose was for "the parties" (celebrations, festivities) (Spanish: a propósito para las fiestas), and that the square should be proportionally large enough for the number of neighbors (Spanish: grandeza proporcionada al número de vecinos). These Spanish regulations also stated that the streets nearby should be comfortable portals for passersby, protecting them from the elements: sun and rain.

Located across the central plaza in Villalba barrio-pueblo is the Parroquia Nuestra Señora del Carmen, a Roman Catholic church.

== Sectors ==
Barrios (which are, in contemporary times, roughly comparable to minor civil divisions) in turn are further subdivided into smaller local populated place areas/units called sectores (sectors in English). The types of sectores may vary, from normally sector to urbanización to reparto to barriada to residencial, among others.

The following sectors are in Villalba barrio-pueblo:

Barriada Cooperativa, Barriada Nueva, Calle Barceló, Calle Figueroa, Calle Luchetti, Calle Muñoz Rivera, Calle Sharton, Calle Vencebil, Calle Walter Mck Jones, Carretera 149, El Coquí, Hogar San Cristobal, Sector Barrio Chino, Sector Palmarejo (El Matadero, El Puente, El Maguey), and Urbanización Villa Alba.

== See also ==
- List of communities in Puerto Rico
- List of barrios and sectors of Villalba, Puerto Rico
