= Hato Puerco Arriba =

Barrio of Villalba, Puerto Rico

- Barrio
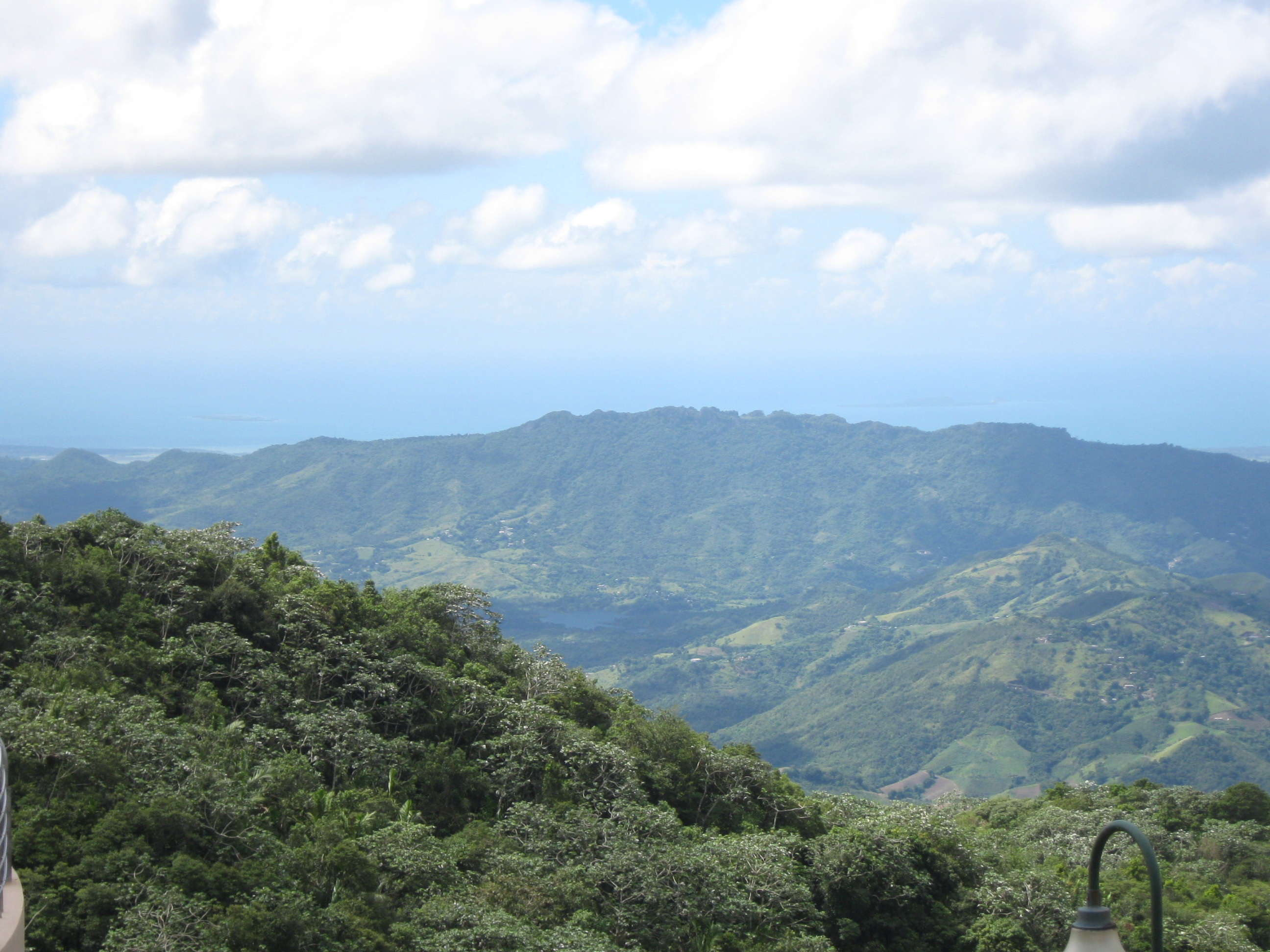
- View from Mirador Orocovis-Villalba

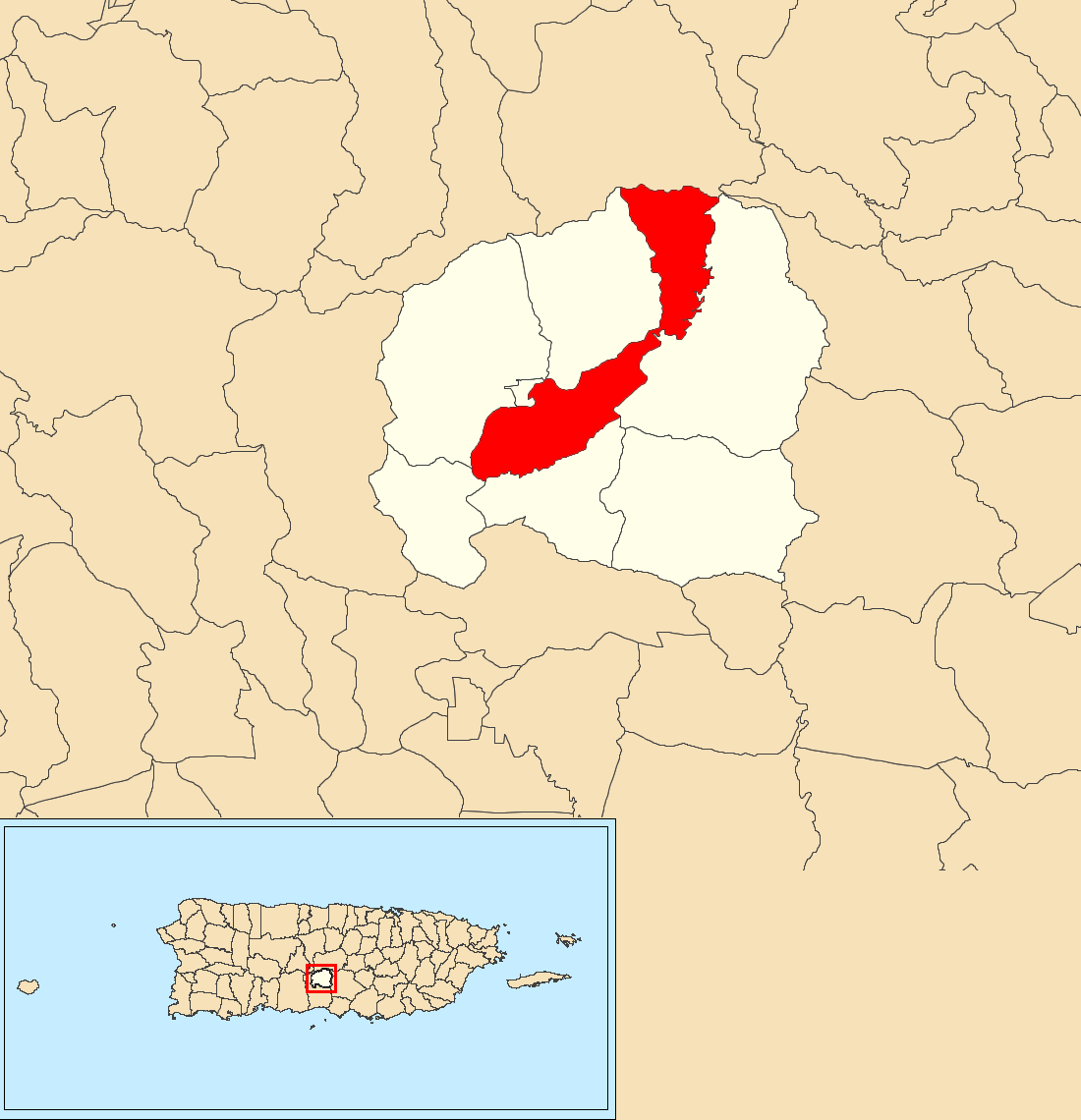
- Location of Hato Puerco Arriba within the municipality of Villalba shown in red

- Location of Puerto Rico
- Coordinates: 18°06′46″N 66°30′20″W
- Commonwealth: Puerto Rico
- Municipality: Villalba

Area
  - Total: 5.16 sq mi (13.4 km^{2})
  - Land: 5.16 sq mi (13.4 km^{2})
  - Water: 0 sq mi (0 km^{2})
- Elevation: 584 ft (178 m)

Population (2010)
  - Total: 7,728
  - Density: 1,497.7/sq mi (578.3/km^{2})
- Source: 2010 Census
- Time zone: UTC−4 (AST)
- ZIP Code: 00766
- Area code: 787/939

Hato Puerco is a barrio in the municipality of Villalba, Puerto Rico. Its population in 2010 was 7,728.

== Features ==
The Mirador Orocovis-Villalba (Orocovis-Villalba Lookout) is in Hato Puerto Arriba and offers views of the Cordillera Central.

== History ==
Hato Puerco Arriba was in Spain's gazetteers until Puerto Rico was ceded by Spain in the aftermath of the Spanish–American War under the terms of the Treaty of Paris of 1898 and became an unincorporated territory of the United States. In 1899, the United States Department of War conducted a census of Puerto Rico finding that the population of Hato Puerco Arriba barrio was 1,496.

Historical population
Census	Pop.	Note	%±
1900	1,496		—
1910	1,458		−2.5%
1920	1,499		2.8%
1930	1,445		−3.6%
1940	1,647		14.0%
1950	2,328		41.3%
1960	2,597		11.6%
1970	0		−100.0%
1980	6,980		—
1990	7,967		14.1%
2000	8,922		12.0%
2010	7,728		−13.4%
U.S. Decennial Census; 1899 (shown as 1900) 1910-1930; 1930-1950 1980-2000 2010

== Sectors ==
Barrios (which are, in contemporary times, roughly comparable to minor civil divisions) in turn are further subdivided into smaller local populated place areas/units called sectores (sectors in English). The types of sectores may vary, from normally sector to urbanización to reparto to barriada to residencial, among others.

The following sectors are in Hato Puerco Arriba barrio:

1ra. Extensión Alturas de Villalba, 2da. Extensión Alturas de Villalba, Carretera 150, Carretera 151, Carretera 560, Carretera 561, Comunidad Toa Vaca (Parcelas, El Punto, La Escuela), Egida Villalba Elderly Apartments, Jovitos, Sector Apeaderos, (El Puente, El Peñón, La Zarza), Sector Camarones (Los Robles, El Junco, La Loma, Cañita, La Escuela, La Ceiba, Camarones Arriba, Jovitos Arriba), Sector El Nuevo Pino (El Pino, Las Casetas, El Parque, La Escuela, Calle Vieja, Parcelas Céspedes), Sector Los Pinos, Urbanización La Vega, Urbanización Monte Bello, and Urbanización Portales del Alba.

== See also ==
- List of communities in Puerto Rico
- List of barrios and sectors of Villalba, Puerto Rico
