= Villalba, Puerto Rico =

Town and municipality in Puerto Rico

Villalba Municipio Autónomo de Villalba
- Town and Municipality
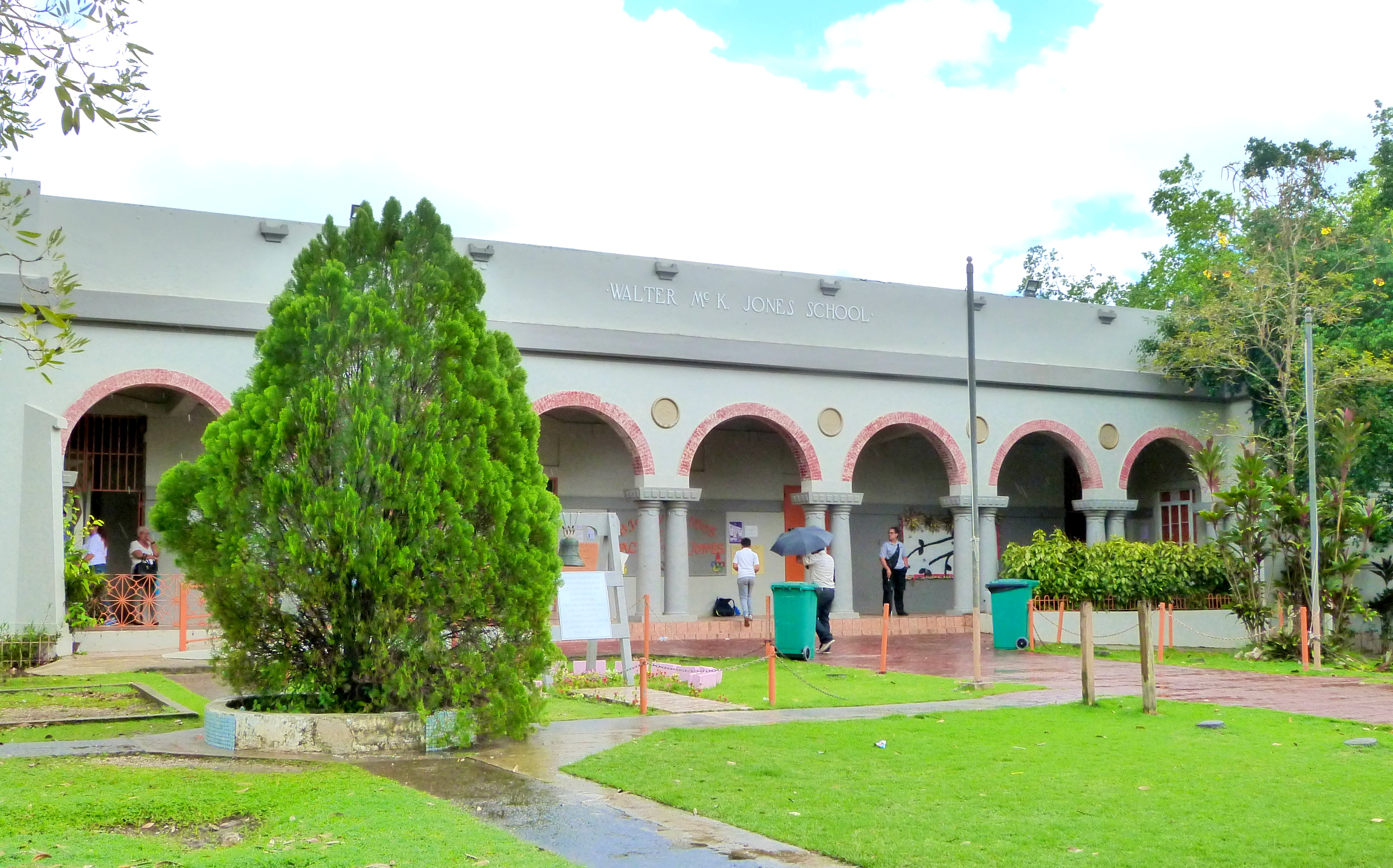
- Walter McK. Jones School in Villalba

- Flag Coat of arms
- Nicknames: "Ciudad de los Avancinos", "Ciudad del Gandul", "Ciudad de los Lagos", "Ciudad del Cooperativismo"
- Anthem: "A las orillas del Río Jacaguas"
- Map of Puerto Rico highlighting Villalba Municipality
- Coordinates: 18°07′38″N 66°29′32″W
- Commonwealth: Puerto Rico
- Settled: February 1, 1852
- Founded: February 14, 1917
- Founder: José Ramón Figueroa, and Walter McJones
- Named for: Don Juan Villalba
- Barrios: 8 barrios: Caonillas Abajo; Caonillas Arriba; Hato Puerco Abajo; Hato Puerco Arriba; Vacas; Villalba Abajo; Villalba Arriba; Pueblo de Villalba

Government
  - Mayor: Dan Santiago (PNP)
  - Senatorial dist.: 6 - Guayama

Area
  - Total: 37.69 sq mi (97.61 km^{2})
  - Land: 37 sq mi (96 km^{2})
  - Water: 0.62 sq mi (1.61 km^{2})

Population (2020)
  - Total: 22,093
  - Estimate (2025): 21,133 ▼
  - Rank: 57th in Puerto Rico
  - Density: 600/sq mi (230/km^{2})
- Demonym: Villalbeños
- Time zone: UTC−4 (AST)
- ZIP Code: 00766
- Area code: 787/939

Villalba (Spanish pronunciation: [biˈʎalβa]), originally known as Villa Alba, is a town and municipality of Puerto Rico located in the central region, northeast of Juana Díaz; south of Orocovis; and west of Coamo. Villalba is spread over 6 barrios and Villalba Pueblo (the downtown area and the administrative center of the city). It is part of the Ponce Metropolitan Statistical Area.

== History ==
Villalba was founded in 1917 by José Ramón Figueroa y Rivera and Walter McJones. Its current mayor is Luis Javier Hernández Ortiz. By 1918, there weren't any highways connecting Villalba to its neighboring towns but by 1927 there was at least one.

Hurricane Maria passed through the area on September 20, 2017 and triggered numerous landslides in Villalba with significant rainfall. Bridges were destroyed and many areas where vital infrastructure was located were inaccessible. The entire electrical system was destroyed. Villalba's emergency operations center and an assisted living center were among the many buildings destroyed in Villalba. Villalba received 27.82 inches of rain. The mayor's stated “Our main need is oxygen. Many people depend on oxygen through artificial respirators that require electricity.".

"From Catastrophe to Hope" (De la catastrofe a la esperanza), a documentary describing the destruction of infrastructure in Villalba and how volunteers, community members, the mayor, and emergency service personnel worked to try to save people's lives was published in 2019 by Noticias de Villalba (Villalba News). The mountainous geography of Villalba made restoring electricity and water services extremely challenging. Chaplains, and religious leaders of all denominations, provided emotional support to all involved.

Subsequent to the hurricane, in 2018, Javier Hernández, the mayor discussed other options for electrical power, such as micro-grids, for Villalba, with the mayor of Hoboken, New Jersey, reminding him that recovery from such a powerful hurricane would take years. Architect Jonathan Marvel talked about his company's plans to build an off-the-grid, 41-unit building in Villalba on the one-year anniversary of Hurricane Maria.

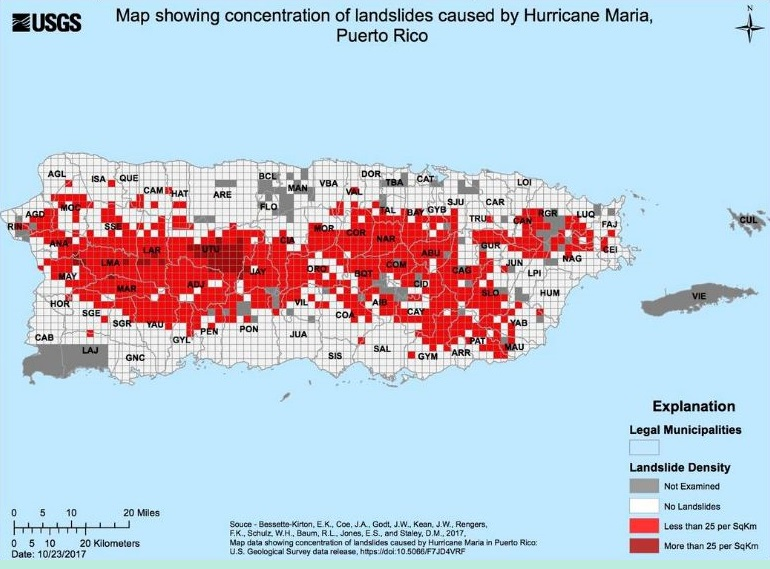
Map of landslides in Puerto Rico caused by Hurricane Maria

== Geography ==
Villalba is located in the central region of Puerto Rico, on a valley in the Cordillera Central. The highest point in the municipality is Cerro El Bolo at 3,526 feet (1,075 m) of elevation, the 10th highest named mountain in Puerto Rico.

- Guayabal Lake
- Toa Vaca Lake
- Toro Negro Forest Reserve

=== Barrios ===
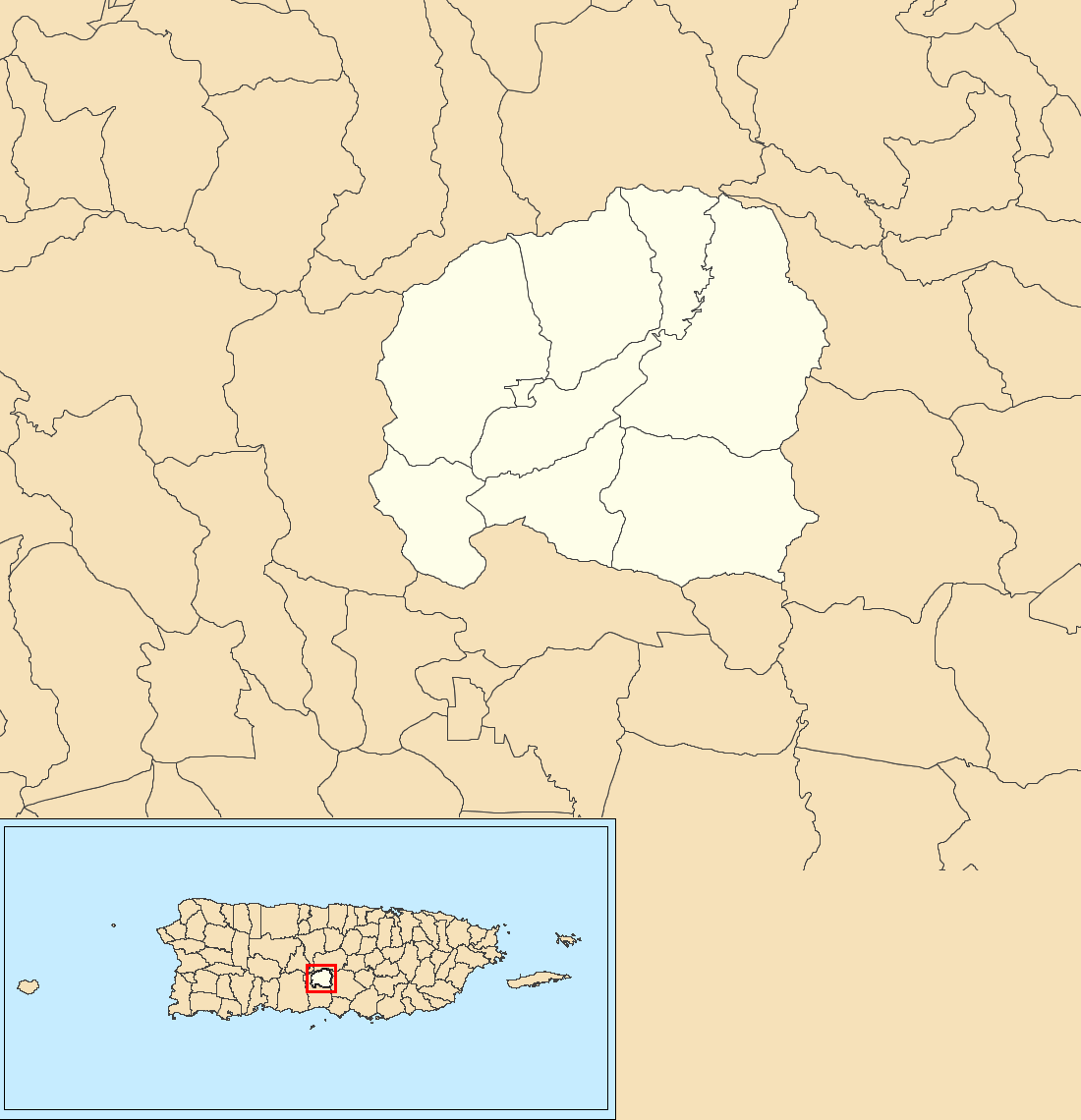
Subdivisions of Villalba

Like all municipalities of Puerto Rico, Villalba is subdivided into barrios. The municipal buildings, central square and large Catholic church are located in a barrio referred to as "el pueblo".

1. Caonillas Abajo
2. Caonillas Arriba
3. Hato Puerco Abajo
4. Hato Puerco Arriba
5. Vacas
6. Villalba Abajo
7. Villalba Arriba
8. Villalba barrio-pueblo

=== Sectors ===
Barrios (which are like minor civil divisions) are further subdivided into smaller areas called sectores (sectors in English). The types of sectores may vary, from normally sector to urbanización to reparto to barriada to residencial, among others.

=== Special Communities ===
Comunidades Especiales de Puerto Rico (Special Communities of Puerto Rico) are marginalized communities whose citizens are experiencing a certain amount of social exclusion. A map shows these communities occur in nearly every municipality of the commonwealth. Of the 742 places that were on the list in 2014, the following barrios, communities, sectors, or neighborhoods were in Villalba: Chino neighborhood, Cooperativa neighborhood, Hato Puerco Arriba, Apeaderos, Sector Cubones in Caonillas Arriba, Palmarejo in Villalba Arriba, Céspedes in Pino, Cerro Gordo and Sector El Semil in Villalba Arriba.

== Energy consortium ==
An Energy Consortium was signed in late February, 2019 by the mayors of Villalba, Orocovis, Morovis, Ciales and Barranquitas municipalities. The consortium is the first of its kind for the island. It is intended to have municipalities work together to safeguard their communities in the event of a catastrophe by creating resilient and efficient energy networks with backups.

== Demographics ==
Historical population
| Census | Pop. | Note | %± |
|---|---|---|---|
| 1920 | 13,040 | | — |
| 1930 | 11,847 | | −9.1% |
| 1940 | 12,871 | | 8.6% |
| 1950 | 14,972 | | 16.3% |
| 1960 | 16,239 | | 8.5% |
| 1970 | 18,733 | | 15.4% |
| 1980 | 20,734 | | 10.7% |
| 1990 | 23,559 | | 13.6% |
| 2000 | 27,913 | | 18.5% |
| 2010 | 26,073 | | −6.6% |
| 2020 | 22,093 | | −15.3% |
| 2025 (est.) | 21,133 | ▼ | −4.3% |
U.S. Decennial Census; 1920-1930; 1930-1950 1960-2000 2010 2020

== Tourism ==
=== Landmarks and places of interest ===
- Walter McK Jones School
- Guayabal Lake
- La Corona Hill
- Toa Vaca Lake
- Toro Negro State Forest
- Biblioteca Pública
- Centro de Bellas Artes Adrian Rosado
- Iglesia Católica Nuestra Señora del Carmen

== Economy ==
=== Agriculture ===
- Coffee, green pigeon peas

=== Industry ===
- Manufacturing of aluminum packaging and electrical and electronic machinery, nutritional products, medical devices, and others.

== Culture ==
=== Festivals and events ===
Villalba celebrates its patron saint festival in July. The Fiestas Patronales de Nuestra Sra. del Carmen is a religious and cultural celebration that generally features parades, games, artisans, amusement rides, regional food, and live entertainment.

Other festivals and events celebrated in Villalba include:

- Puerto Rico Marathon - July
- Areyto Festival - November
- Carlos Báez Marathon - December
- Festival del ñame y Carne Frita- November

In 2017, Villalba celebrated the 100th year of its founding.

== Government ==
All municipalities in Puerto Rico are administered by a mayor, elected every four years. The current mayor of Villalba is Danny Santiago, of the New Progressive Party (PNP). He was first elected at the 2024 general elections.

The city belongs to the Puerto Rico Senatorial district VI, which is represented by two Senators. In 2024, Rafael Santos Ortiz and Wilmer Reyes Berríos were elected as District Senators.

== Symbols ==
The municipio has an official flag and coat of arms.

=== Flag ===
Four horizontal, unequal stripes in width, that from top to bottom have the following order: green, white, green and yellow. In the immediate side to the flagstaff, in the superior stripe, appears, in white color, the star of the shield.

=== Coat of arms ===
On a green background, representing land, a 19th-century villa, reflected by six homes and a church in silver and red, the church is adorned with the shield of Carmelites, and a white star prominently displays and shines over the villa. Around its border are five fig leaves. Atop are three golden towers.

== Transportation ==
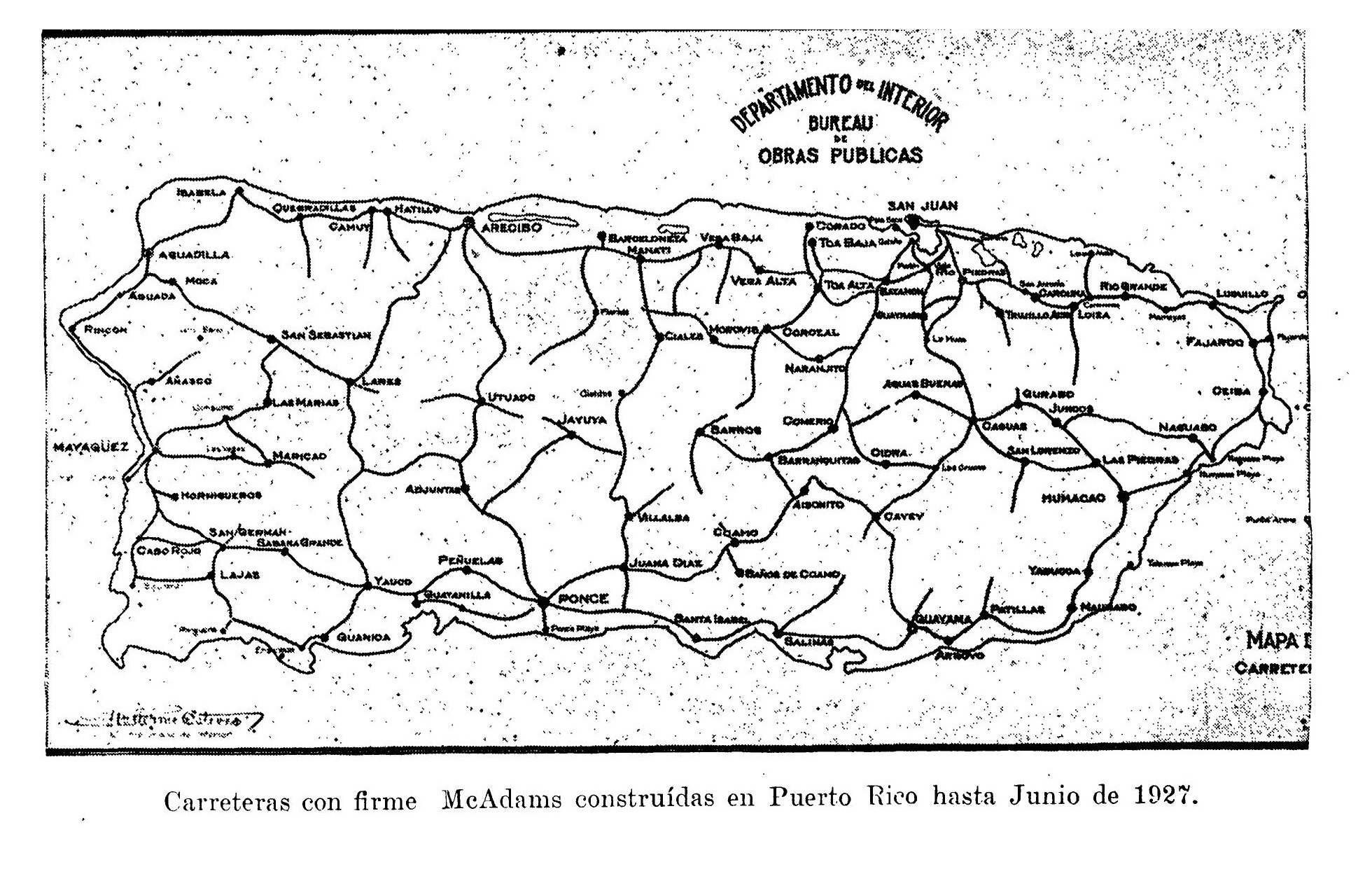
Highways in Puerto Rico by 1927, Villalba is connected to Juana Díaz and the northern municipalities by PR-149

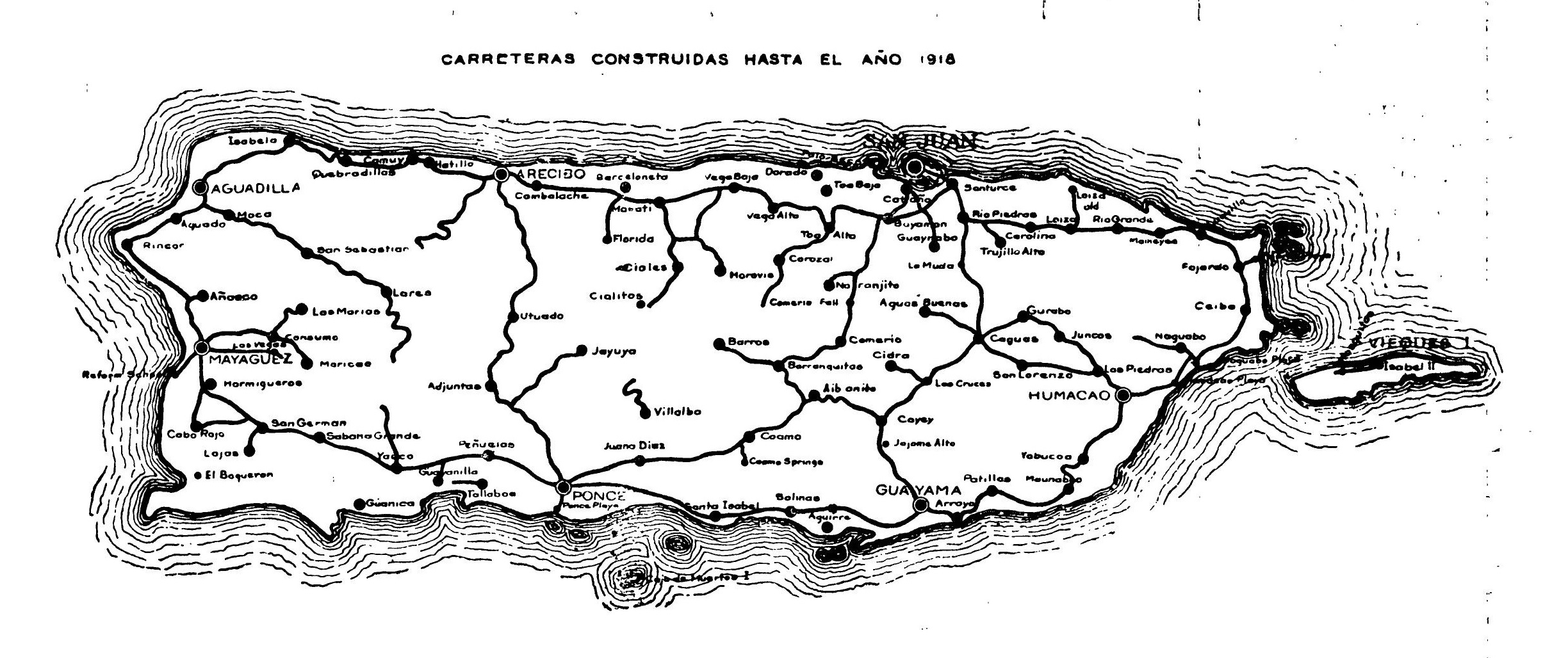
Highways in Puerto Rico by 1918, showing Villalba is not connected to its neighboring towns / municipalities

In 1918, Villalba was not yet connected to neighboring towns or municipalities. By 1927, Villalba was connected to Juana Díaz, and other neighboring municipalities with Puerto Rico Highway 149.

There are 23 bridges in Villalba.

== Education ==
- Villalba School District (Puerto Rico Department of Education)
- Puerto Rico Criminal Justice College- Villalba Campus (Puerto Rico Police Academy)

== Gallery ==
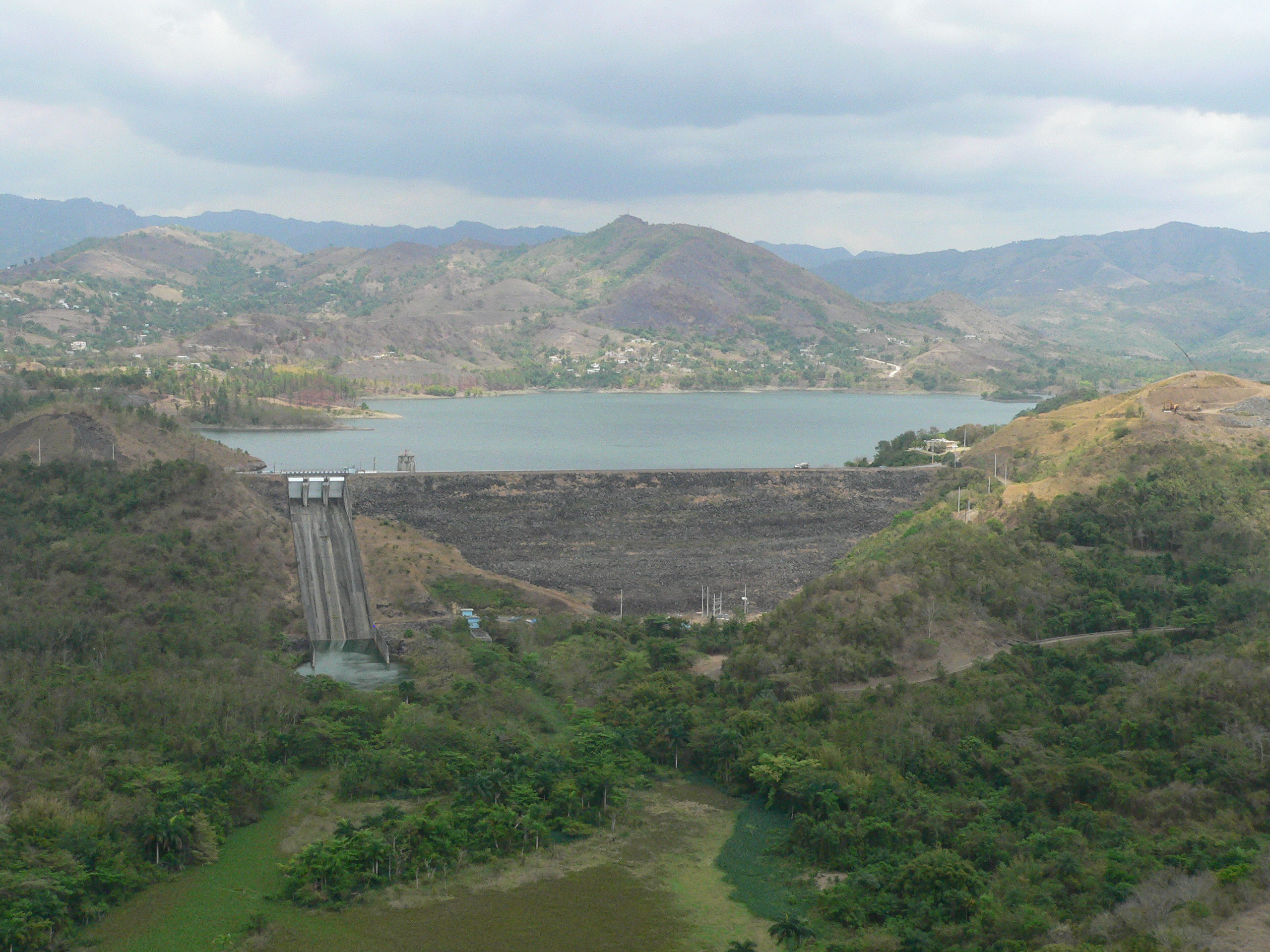
Lake Toa Vaca in Villalba

== See also ==
- List of Puerto Ricans
- History of Puerto Rico
- Did you know-Puerto Rico?
