= Toro Negro State Forest =

State forest in Puerto Rico

Toro Negro State Forest Spanish: Bosque Estatal de Toro Negro
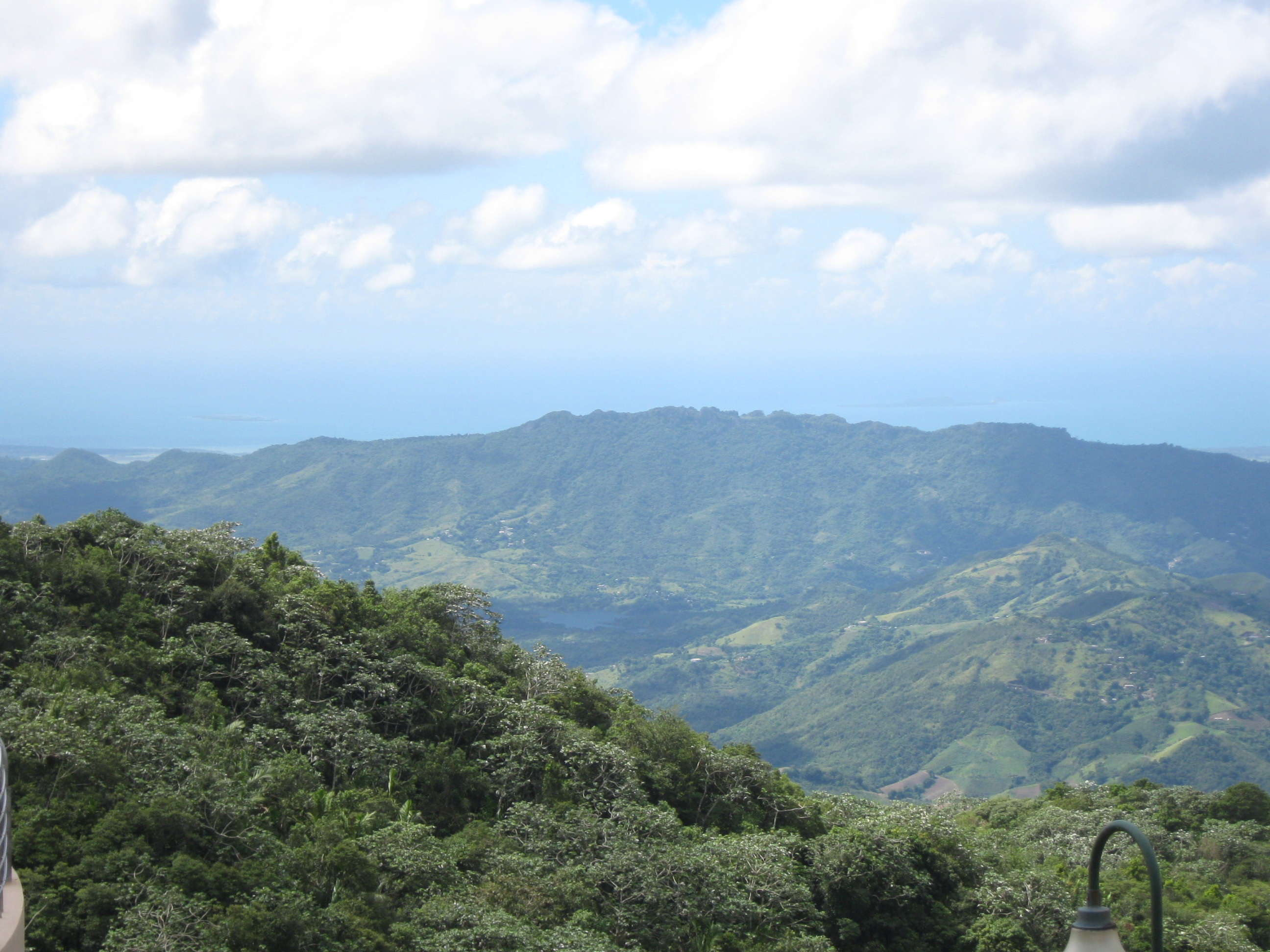
- Bosque Estatal de Toro Negro shown in the foreground

- Location within Puerto Rico

Geography
- Location: PR-143, km. 32.4 and PR-149 km 39.0, Ponce/Jayuya/Orocovis/Ciales/Juana Diaz, Puerto Rico
- Coordinates: 18°10′24″N 66°29′32″W
- Elevation: 4,390 feet (1,340 m)
- Area: 8,204 cuerdas (3,224 ha; 7,968 acres) (32.24 km^{2})

Administration
- Status: Public, Commonwealth
- Established: 1934 with 2,800-hectare (6,800-acre)
- Visitation: 126,916 (2008)
- Events: Cerro Maravilla murders
- Authority: Puerto Rico DRNA
- Website: www.drna.gobierno.pr

Ecology
- Ecosystems: Subtropical Moist Zone (31% of the forest): -Tabonuco forest. Lower Mountain Wet Zone (69% of the forest): -Micropholis Buchenavia forest, -Mountain palm forest, -Cloud forest.
- WWF Classification: Puerto Rican moist forests
- Disturbance: -Hurricanes and Landslides
- Forest cover: 81% - 99%
- Dominant tree species: Melastomaceae (16 species), Lauraceae (11 species), Myrtaceae (10 species)
- Indicator plants: Tabonuco (Dacryodes excelsa), Ausubo (Manilkara bidentata), (Note: Puerto Rico DRNA erroneously calls this species Manilkara zapota, which is a different species (of the same genus Manilkara) cultivated for its níspero fruit. The correct species for the Ausubo tree is Manilkara bidentata, a tree cultivated for its lumber. In addition note that the (erroneous) scientific name given by the DRNA (Manilkara zapota) is never known as Ausubo. Its common name would be Sapodilla.); Montillo (Sloanea berteroana)

Toro Negro State Forest (Spanish: Bosque Estatal de Toro Negro) is one of the 21 forests that make up the public forests system in Puerto Rico. It is also Puerto Rico's highest cloud forest. It is in the Cordillera Central region of the island and covers 8,204 cuerdas (3,224 ha; 7,968 acres; 32.24 km^{2}), of mountains. Toro Negro's mountains have heights reaching up to 4,400 feet (1,300 m) and include Cerro de Punta, Cerro Jayuya and Cerro Rosa, the three highest peaks in the island. Nested among these mountains is Lake Guineo, the island's highest lake. The forest has 18 kilometers (11 mi) of trails, an observation tower, two natural swimming pools (Spanish:"charcos"), camping and picnic areas, nine rivers, and numerous creeks and waterfalls. The forest spans areas within the municipalities of Ponce, Jayuya, Orocovis, Ciales, and Juana Díaz, and consists of seven non-contiguous tracts of land. The largest contiguous segment of the forest is located in the municipalities of Ponce and Jayuya. Some 40% of the area of Toro Negro State Forest is located in Ponce's Barrio Anón.

When created in 1935 as part of the Caribbean National Forest, the Toro Negro Forest Reserve was managed by the United States government, first via the Puerto Rico Reconstruction Administration of the Department of the Interior (1935–1942) and later through the Forest Service of the Department of Agriculture (1942–1970). Then, in 1970, the Federal Government exchanged with the Government of the Commonwealth of Puerto Rico the Toro Negro section of the Caribbean National Forest for some forested lands belonging to the Commonwealth and located adjacent to the much larger federal lands at Luquillo National Forest resulting in the creation at Luquillo of the current El Yunque National Forest. In 1970, the Government of Puerto Rico's Departmento de Recursos Naturales y Ambientales (DRNA) opened the Toro Negro Forest Reserve as a Commonwealth state forest and renamed it Bosque Estatal de Toro Negro (Toro Negro State Forest).

== History ==
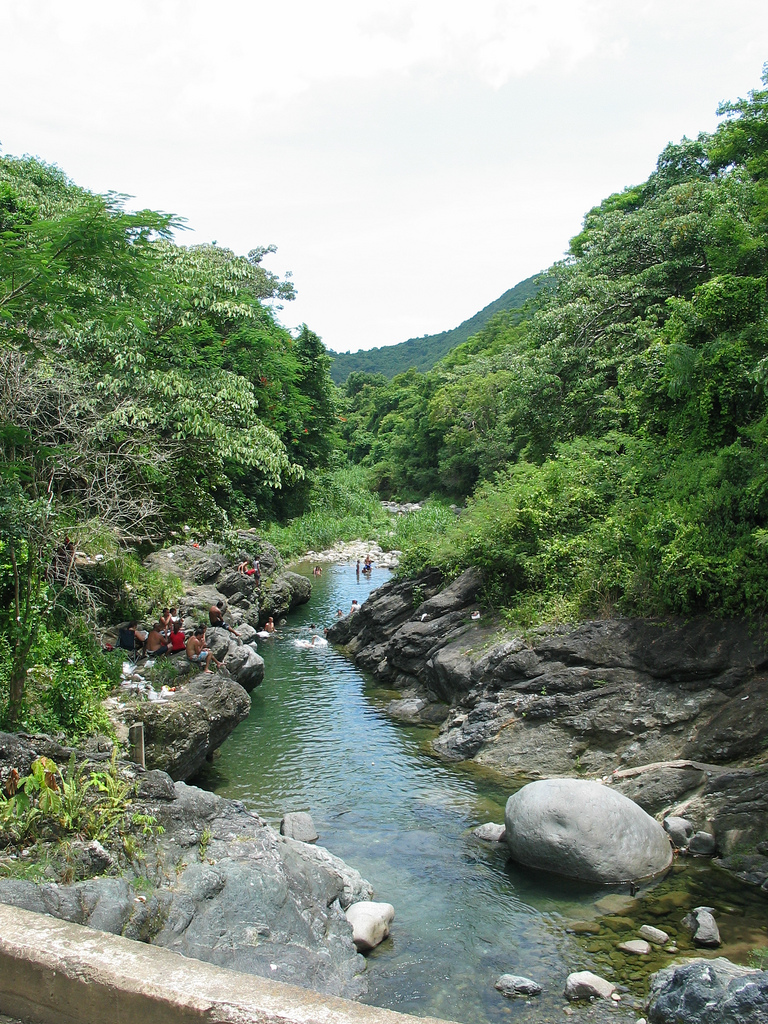
Río Inabón as it makes its way out of the Toro Negro forest

In 1876, Spanish King Alfonso XII of Spain issued the first proclamation for the creation of forest reserves in Puerto Rico. The land where Toro Negro sits was originally used for coffee plantations until the 1930s when a program of reforestation was commenced.

In 1934, those lands were acquired by the Puerto Rico Reconstruction Administration (PRRA). The forest started with a total of 2,733 cuerdas (1,074 ha; 2,654 acres) in 1934. In 1935, 1,900 cuerdas (750 ha; 1,800 acres) of private lands were purchased by the PRRA. The forest was not a separate entity at the time; it was part of the Caribbean National Forest, and was administered by the U.S. Forest Service as the Toro Negro Division of the Caribbean National Forest. Additional lands brought the total size of the Toro Negro purchase that year to 6,620 cuerdas (2,600 ha; 6,430 acres), and at least an additional 1,385 cuerdas (544 ha; 1,345 acres) were in the process of being acquired in 1936. Between 1934 and 1945 over 3 million seedlings and approximately 8,600 kilograms (19,000 lb) of seeds were sown on 1,856 cuerdas (729 ha; 1,803 acres) of the forest. Twenty-eight species were planted in twenty-nine different plantations. In 1942, the US Department of the Interior transferred the forest to the United States Department of Agriculture. From 1942 to 1961, it was administered by the US Forest Service. During these years, the U.S. Department of Agriculture continued its acquisition of lands increasing the acreage of Toro Negro.

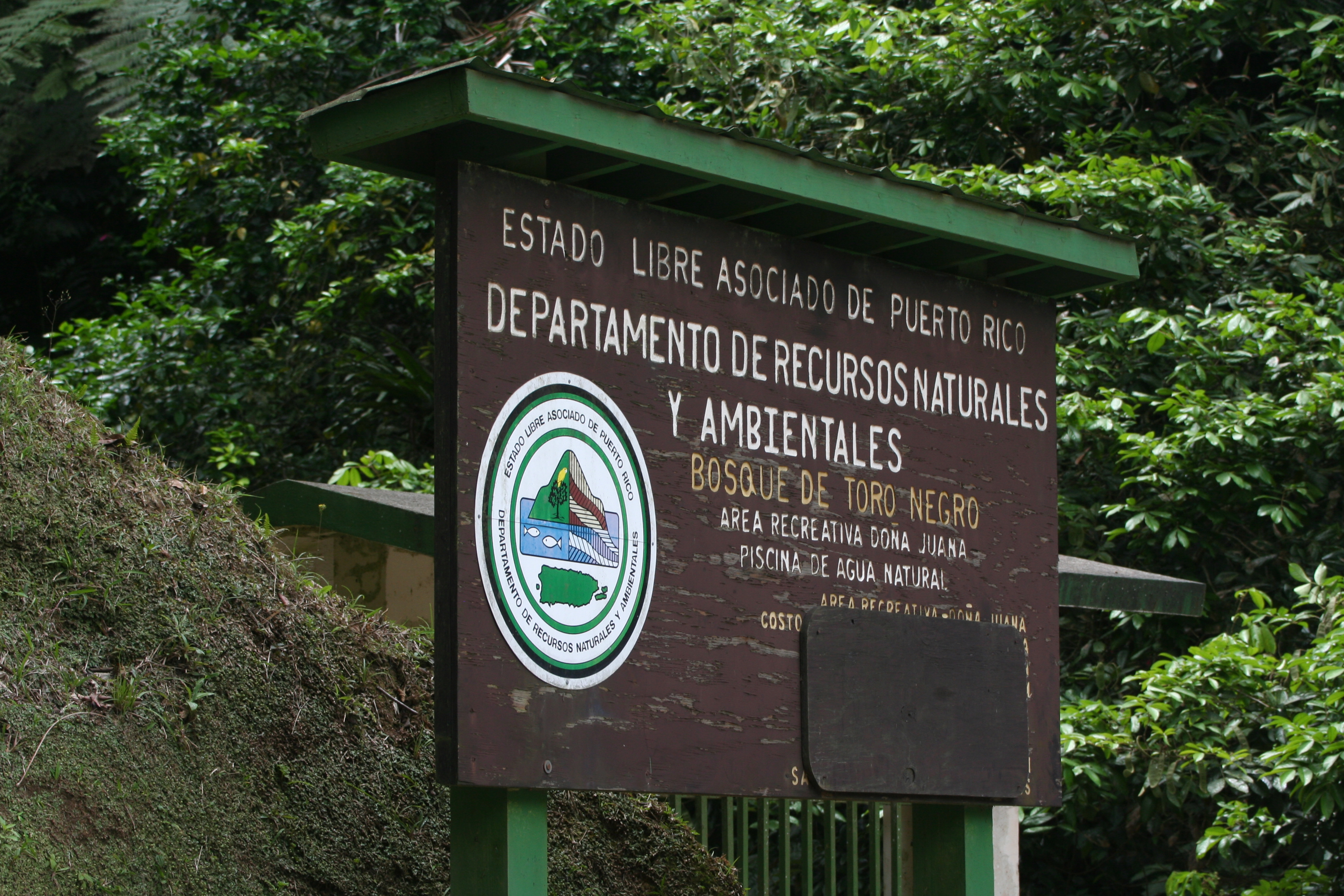
Bosque Estatal de Toro Negro

In 1961, Toro Negro was transferred to the Government of Puerto Rico. The transfer was finalized on 21 May 1962, when the 6,817 cuerdas (2,679 ha; 6,621 acres) of land that constituted the Toro Negro Unit of the Caribbean National Forest were signed away to the Government of Puerto Rico by the Federal Government. Of these 6,817 cuerdas (2,679 ha; 6,621 acres), 1,996 cuerdas (1,939 acres) were exchanged for 1,614 cuerdas (634 ha; 1,568 acres) located adjacent to the Luquillo Unit of the Caribbean National Forest. The remaining 4,821 cuerdas (1,895 ha; 4,682 acres) were ceded to Puerto Rico's Department of Agriculture for forestry purposes. This resulted in the Toro Negro State Forest. Since 1962, approximately 120 cuerdas have been planted to eucalyptus, mahoe, kadam and Honduran pine. In 1962, Toro Negro had 6,817 cuerdas (2,679 ha; 6,621 acres), representing 11.32% of Puerto Rico's state forests. In 1962 the Area Recreacional Doña Juana was added to Toro Negro. In April 1970, a land exchange which included the Puerto Rico Department of Agriculture purchase and transfer of 1,677 cuerdas (659 ha; 1,629 acres) forest lands adjacent to Luquillo Experimental Forest in exchange for the complete transfer of Toro Negro forest lands to the Commonwealth of Puerto Rico.

The lower elevations of Toro Negro used to be important coffee-producing plantations, however, the entire forest is especially critical for water and soil conservation. Today, the amount of tree foliage coverage in the forest ranges from 81% in the moist forest zone to 99% in the lower montane wet forest zone. The forest was named for the Río Toro Negro, one of nine rivers that flow out of the forest, and the name of one of the barrios in the Ciales portion of the forest.

== Protected area ==
Protected Areas at Bosque Estatal de Toro Negro
- IUCN category IV (habitat/species management area)
- Interactive map of Protected Areas at Bosque Estatal de Toro Negro
- Location: Puerto Rico; Ponce (Approx 40%), Jayuya (Approx 30%), Orocovis (Approx 15%), Ciales (Approx 10%), and Juana Diaz (Approx 5%)
- Nearest city: Ponce
- Area: 3,224.4 hectares (7,967.6 acres)
- Established: 1934
- Visitors: 126,916 (in 2008)
- Governing body: Puerto Rico DRNA

Toro Negro is a protected area under the law. The forest has a protected status of "IV" ("Protected Area with sustainable use of natural resources") according to the International Union for Conservation of Nature (IUCN) convention. Ecological protection is managed and enforced by the Puerto Rico Department of Natural and Environmental Resources.

Through the parcelero (from the Spanish root for "parcel", or land lot) program, people who were living in the lands being incorporated into the reserve during the federal government land acquisitions of 1935 were allowed to stay in their places when forest protection went into effect.

In January 1999, a bill in the Puerto Rico House of Representatives sought to increase the size of the protected area by unifying the Toro Negro, Guilarte, and Pueblo de Adjuntas State Forests. In a March 2008 study by its International Institute of Tropical Forestry (IITF), the U.S. Department of Agriculture classified Toro Negro State Forest as a Commonwealth of Puerto Rico forest of "Status 2", s status it defines as "an area having permanent protection from conversion of natural land cover and a mandated management plan in operation to maintain a primarily natural state, but which may receive use or management practices that degrade the quality of existing natural communities". As of 2013, there were ongoing governmental initiatives in place to acquire, from private owners, additional lands adjacent to the Toro Negro State Forest to increase the protected area of the forest as well as to create a wildlife forest corridor that would join Toro Negro with the nearby Tres Picachos and Guilarte state forests through plans such as the federal Forest Legacy Areas initiative.

== Location ==
Toro Negro is located in the central mountainous region of Puerto Rico and it has a total area of 8,203.6977 cuerdas (3,224.3778 ha; 7,967.6110 acres). It is located in remote areas of the Cordillera Central mountain range. The forest office is at km. 32.4 of Route PR-143, east of the intersection with Route PR-149. The forest distribution encompasses a range from 18°07'30" N and 18°15'00" N to 66°30'00" W and 66°37'30" W. The forest ranger's office and visitors' area are located on Puerto Rico Highway 143 Km 32.4 in Barrio Ala de la Piedra, Orocovis at 18.17342°N, 66.49231°W (18°10′24.312″N 66°29′32.316″W). The largest sections of the forest are located in the municipalities of Ponce and Jayuya, both of which are municipalities in the Puerto Rico Tourism Company's Porta Caribe tourism zone. Cerro de Punta 1,338 meters (4,390 ft), the highest peak in Puerto Rico, is located in the western section of the forest and the lowest elevation is found at the south edge of the forest near Salto de Inabón (Inabón Falls), an altitude of approximately 440 meters (1,440 ft).

== Forest types ==
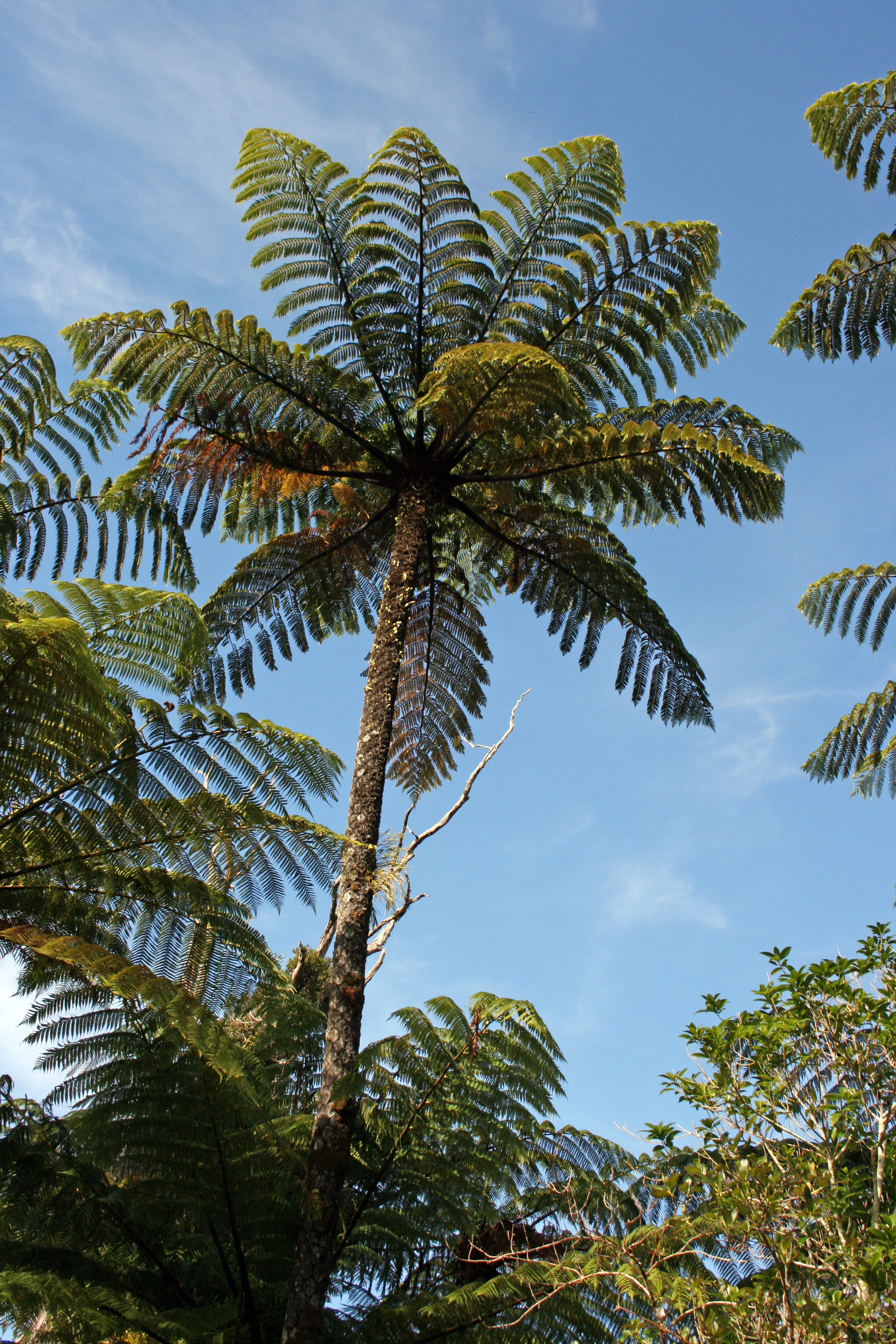
Tree ferns like this Cyathea are abundant at Toro Negro.

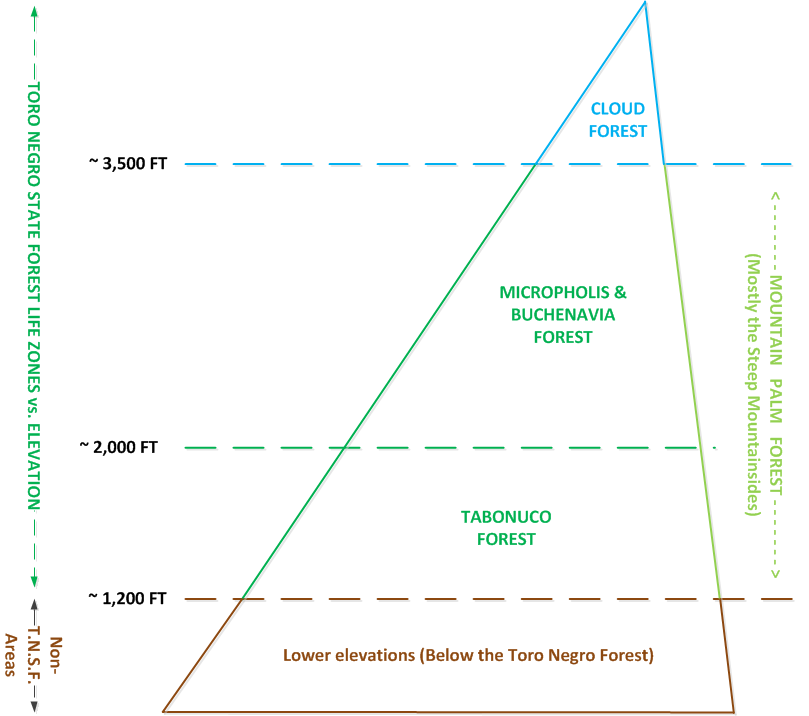
Bosque Estatal Toro Negro life zone-to-elevation relationships

Four vegetation associations have been delineated in two bioclimatic life zones. The two climatic biome zones are: the subtropical moist forest life zone (31% of the forest) and the lower mountain wet forest life zone (the remaining 69% of the forest). The topography is accentuated by a large number of steep slopes and high waterfalls. Toro Negro subforests are catalogued on the basis of their elevation and content. From Cerro Maravilla, one of the tallest peaks in the forest, four of Puerto Rico's distinct forest types can be seen: Bosque Tabonuco, Bosque Micropholis Buchenavia, Bosque Sierra de Palmas, and Bosque enano.

=== Bosque Tabonuco forest ===
At the lower elevations of the forest (below 2,000 feet [610 m] above sea level) stands the Bosque Tabonuco forest which is dominated by the majestic Tabonuco tree (Dacryodes excelsa) that can reach up to 100 feet (30 m) and grows primarily in protected sites at low elevations. The Tabonuco forest has many of the characteristics for which tropical rain forests are noted. The forest canopy has three levels: an upper level that may be as much as 35% Tabonuco, a lower canopy, and an under story. The second most prominent tree in this forest type, the Montillo (Sloanea berteroana), has large buttress roots, typical of many rain forest trees. Such roots help support the heavy canopy of large trees growing in very wet soil. The forest floor is only scarcely vegetated, but the forest canopy is rich with aerial plants: bromeliads, orchids, vines, and arboreal ferns. The tabonuco type dominates in the subtropical wet life zone.

=== Bosque Micropholis Buchenavia forest ===
Above 2,000 feet (610 m) is the Bosque Micropholis Buchenavia forest. Tree height in the Micropholis Buchenavia forest is less than 50 feet (15 m), and the layers of the forest canopy are less distinct than in the Tabonuco type. Micropholis and Buchenavia (Granadillo) are the dominant species in this lower montane zonal vegetation association.

=== Sierra de Palmas forest ===
At about the same elevation as the Bosque Micropholis Buchenavia forest (above 2,000 feet [610 m]), but on very steep slopes, are the Sierra de Palmas forests dominated by the sierra palm (Prestoea montana). Sometimes called palm-breaker, this forest type may reach 50 feet (15 m) in height. The Sierra de Palmas covers the largest area of all forest types in Toro Negro. The palm forest is distinguishable at a great distance by the form and size of leaves and by the general pale green color of the foliage. Below 650 meters (2,130 ft) elevation the palms appear as scattered elements; however at higher elevations the sierra palm becomes a dominant species over a large area. The trunk of the sierra palm is straight, erect, cylindrical and attains heights of 10–15 metres (33–49 ft). The pinnate leaves are mostly 2.0–2.5 metres (6.6–8.2 ft) long and cast a dense shade on the ground. The palm forest, nearly always a single species dominant is normally open and free from undergrowth of any kind. The globose fruits are somewhat more than one centimeter in diameter and produced in great abundance.

=== Bosque Enano forest ===
At the highest elevations, near the top of Cerro de Punta, Cerro Maravilla and similar peaks, grows the Bosque enano forest, also known as dwarf forest, cloud forest, elfin forest and moss forest. This forest type is composed of very dense stands of small, stunted trees and shrubs. The cloud forest has many of the same tree species as the Bosque Micropholis Buchenavia forest, but growth is limited by adverse climate—heavy rain, strong winds, and almost constant cloud cover.

The dwarf or cloud forest developed in the higher peaks of the Central Cordillera is quite different in general appearance from the cloud forest of Sierra Luquillo Mountains due to the less rigorous environment in Toro Negro. The physical effect of the wind is much reduced; the shrubs are neither bent nor shorn to an even surface, but are essentially erect and their crowns are rounded and uneven in outline. The mosses are reduced to a thin mantle on the more sheltered trunks and are absent in many places, while the great mats of Selaginella are completely lacking.

In the Toro Negro forest, only the most inaccessible mountain tops have never been cleared. Most of the lower areas are subject to the familiar routine of logging, clearing, burning, and grazing or semi-permanent cultivation. Most of the forest lands in Toro Negro rise above the upper limit of successful coffee cultivation.

== Geology ==
Toro Negro State Forest has both deep soils and surface soils. Deep soils are derived from volcanic igneous rock, fine-grained. These contain high amounts of permeable clay, low amounts of sand, silt, and high amounts of iron and aluminum, but little silica. The surface soils are acidic and brittle while the subsoil is acidic and heavy, but permeable. Its hills are mostly steep. Usually the top soil is lost by erosion.

There are nine rivers that flow south (Río Indalecia, Río Guayo, Río Inabón, Río Blanco, Río Anón and Río Prieto), and three that flow north (Río Saliente, Río Toro Negro, and Río Matrullas) from the forest. The Matrullas and Guineo reservoirs are also part of the forest. Río Toro Negro - after which the forest is named - separates the municipalities of Ciales and Orocovis; it also forms Lago El Guineo. The forest's other lake, Lago Matrullas, is accessible via Puerto Rico Highway 564, which can be accessed via PR-143, in the municipality of Orocovis.

== Flora ==
Fauna and Flora at Bosque Estatal de Toro Negro
- IUCN category IV (habitat/species management area)
- Interactive map of Fauna and Flora at Bosque Estatal de Toro Negro
- Location: Ponce, Ponce / Jayuya / Orocovis / Ciales / Juana Diaz, Puerto Rico
- Area: 6,945 acres (28.11 km^{2})
- Elevation: 4,390 ft (1,340 m)Highest peak in Puerto Rico
- Established: 1934
- Named for: Toro Negro River
- Visitors: 126,916(67% island residents and 33% international visitors)
- Governing body: Puerto Rico Department of Natural and Environmental Resources
- Website: Toro Negro State Forest

Toro Negro has four vegetation associations catalogued into two subtropical moist life zones: The first is a Subtropical Moist Zone (Zona Muy Húmeda Subtropical) and consists of the Tabonuco forest (Bosque de Tabonuco). The second is the Lower Mountain Wet Zone (Zona Muy Húmeda Montaña Abajo). This zone consists of three sub forests: the Micropholis Buchenavia forest (Bosque Micropholis Buchenavia), the Mountain Palm forest (Bosque de Palma de Sierra), and the Dwarf forest (Bosque Enano).

E. L. Little and F. H. Wadsworth reported a total of 160 tree species distributed amongst 53 families. The largest families are: Melastomaceae (16 species), Lauraceae (11 species) and Myrtaceae (10 species).

Ferns and orchids are abundant. Forty of the species found in this forest are endemic to Puerto Rico and thirteen are introduced species. The fern Thelypteris inabonensis, endemic to this forest and found only at the headwaters of Rio Inabon and at the Toro Negro's Cerro Rosa in Ciales, has been identified by the U.S. Fish and Wildlife Service as an endangered species.

Some of the more common trees are: tabonuco (Dacryodes excelsa), ausubo (Manilkara bidentata), jagüilla (Magnolia portoricensis), nuez moscada (Ocotea moschata), granadillo (Buchenavia capitata), maga (Montezuma speciosissima), higüerillo (Vitex divaricata), almedrón (Prunus occidentalis) and jácana (Pouteria multiflora). In addition Palmas de sierra (Prestoea montana) and helechos arbóreos (Cyathea Sp.) are very abundant. Some of the species that were introduced to this forest are mahoe (Hibiscus elatus Sw.), caoba hondureña (Swietenia macrophylla), pino hondureño (Pinus caribaea), eucalipto (Eucalyptus robusta) and kadam (Anthocephalus chinensis).

Ilex cookii, commonly known as Cook's Holly or te, is a small evergreen holly shrub known to exist only in the Toro Negro State Forest and only in extremely limited amounts. It is listed as a critically endangered species by the IUCN and protected by law.

Between 1935 and 1943, 28 species of trees were planted in Toro Negro. Their plantings (either via seeding or via planting of saplings) consisted of both native and exotic species. Nineteen native species were planted as follows (the quantity planted/seeded is shown after the species; and X means experimental planting only):

- Buchenavia tetraphylla, 200
- Ocotea spathulata, 1,000
- Calophyllum calaba, 52,990
- Petitia domingensis, 9,200
- Cedrela odorata, 499,526
- Podocarpus coreacius, X
- Cordia alliodora, 553,892
- Pouteria multiflora, 2,963,736
- Dacryodes excelsa, 22,375
- Prunus occidentales, X
- Eugenia stahlii, 6,500
- Sideroxylon foetidissimum, 2,098
- Guarea guidonia, 109,351
- Tabebuia heterophylla, 12,400
- Hymenaea courbaril, 14
- Thespesia grandiflora, 141,885
- Manilkara bidentata, 3,500
- Vitex divaricada, 195,874
- Ocotea moschata, 71,131

The nine exotic species were:

- Bambusa vulgaris, 2,350
- Pinus caribaea, X
- Cupressus lusitanica, X
- Swietenia macrophylla, 764,436
- Eucalyptus spp., 158,910
- Swietenia mahagoni, 35443
- Fraxinus uhdei, X
- Tectona grandis, 850
- Hibiscus elatus, X

== Fauna ==
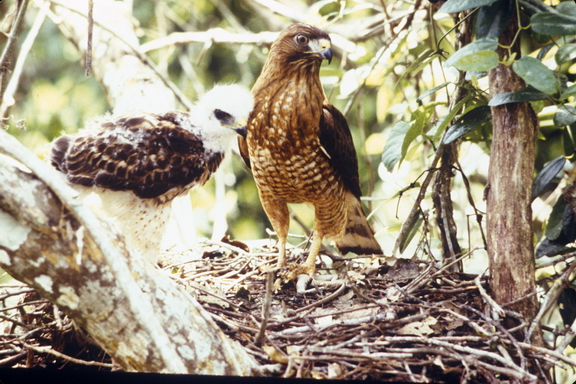
Puerto Rican broad-winged hawks (Buteo platypterus brunnescens) like this one are part of Toro Negro's fauna.

There are 30 species of birds reported, including 6 endemic species and two that are endangered: the Puerto Rican sharp-shinned hawk (Vernacular Spanish: Falcón de sierra; Taxonomy: Accipiter striatus venator) and Puerto Rican broad-winged hawk (Vernacular Spanish: Guaragüao de bosque; Taxonomy: Buteo platypterus brunnescens). The Puerto Rican parrot (Vernacular Spanish: Cotorra puertorriqueña; Taxonomy: Amazona vittata), a critically endangered species, has also been seen in this forest. Since 2007, Toro Negro has been a recognized component of the Cordillera Central Important Bird Area by BirdLife International along with other state forests and protected natural areas of the Puerto Rican Central Mountain Range.

Recent studies have identified eight species of bats. They are most visible at dusk as this is when these nocturnal critters are out foraging for food, primarily mosquitoes. The 13 species of bats living in the forest play an important ecological role in controlling mosquitoes, which not only carry diseases but also harass hikers. The three most prevalent bat species are the greater bulldog bat, Antillean ghost-faced bat and the sooty mustached bat.

There are 20 species of reptiles and amphibians and, with the exception of Bufo marinus (Spanish: Sapo común), all are endemic. Reptiles include the Lagarto verde (Note: Puerto Rico DRNA erroneously calls this species Lagartijo gigante. Its correct common name is Spanish is Lagarto verde. (See citations to Anolis cuvieri)) (Anolis cuvieri), lagartijo pigmeo (Anolis occultus), and boa de Puerto Rico (Chilabothrus inornatus), which is in danger of extinction; amphibians include the siguana (Ameiva exsul) and the culebra ciega (Amphisbaena caeca). Amphibians include coquí común (Eleutherodactylus coqui) and the coquí de la montaña (Eleutherodactylus portoricensis), a species denominated as vulnerable under Puerto Rico Law 6766. The Small Asian mongoose (Vernacular Spanish: Mangosta pequeña asiática; Taxonomy: Herpestes javanicus), has also been spotted inhabiting this forest.

Toro Negro State Forest is home to 11 species of snakes, all non-venomous to humans. The Puerto Rican boa (Chilabothrus inornatus) grows to 6–7 feet (1.8–2.1 m) in length and weighs about 2 pounds (0.91 kg). It is a heavy-bodied snake with tan to dark brown body color and dark blotches down its back. It will defend itself with a bite, but kills its prey by suffocation. It is a protected species due to over-harvesting to collect oil and skins. It is nocturnal and prefers to remain under cover during the day and hunt at night. The Puerto Rican racer (Culebra Corredora; Alsophis portoricensis) grows to 3 feet (0.91 m). It slinks around in the trees of the Toro Negro Forest. His body sports a solid brown color with each of his scales edged by a darker brown. Like the forest's other various garden snakes, it is a daytime hunter. The forest also features blind snakes. They spend nearly their entire lives underground but do sometimes take cover under rotting trees. They do not bite as they do not have teeth.

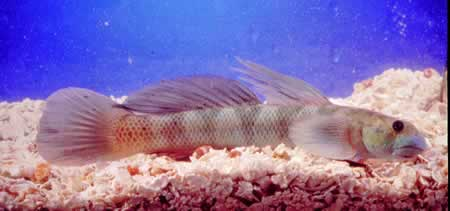
The Olivo fish (Sicydium plumieri), common in waters of the forest

Its rivers and lakes are home to several species of fish and crustaceans. Fish found here include Dajao (Vernacular English: Mountain Mullet; Taxonomy: Agonostomus monticola) and Olivo (Sicydium plumieri), also known as Ceti. Some crustaceans are the camarón bocu (Macrobrachium crenulatum), gata (Atya lanipes), and buruquena (Epilobocera sinuatifrons), all endemic to Puerto Rico.

== Facilities ==
With the exception of the Salto de Doña Juana waterfall, all of the forest facilities, including all trails, are located within the municipality of Orocovis and they are collectively known as the Doña Juana Recreational Area. Guided tours are available or visitors explore on their own. Ziplining is also a common activity in the Toro Negro forest. The forest office, staffed by personnel from the Puerto Rico Department of Natural and Environmental Resources, provides maps of the forest and its trails and services, weather conditions information, and mud slides danger levels. Among the facilities available at Toro Negro are a camping area, a recreational area, a system of hiking trails and observation points.

=== Trails ===
Officially there are 10 hiking trails covering 18 kilometers (11 mi). They are provided for hiking as well as to facilitate bird and landscape watching, meditation, and similar activities. While the official number of trails is stated as 10, some of the trails are actually dirt roads for park ranger vehicles. Also, some of the "trails" require the hiker to walk a segment on a paved Commonwealth road or county road. Trails are generally quite wide, but being a forest in mountains with high humidity and rain precipitation, many of the trails are muddy in at least some areas. Hikers are often seen with walking sticks, which help maintain balance when walking on slippery surfaces, particularly the algae-covered ground rocks present on some of the trails. Some of the trails lead to or run near charcos. Charcos are natural swimming pools (swimming holes). The Toro Negro State Forest office is the starting point for several of the trails. However, most of the trails are not well marked, nor are they well kept, so they can be hard to locate and to follow in the dense forest. Under an agreement with the government of Puerto Rico, the municipality of Orocovis is the entity responsible for trail maintenance. The 10 official trails are:

| No. | Trail Name | Features | Description | Approx length | Notes | Northern Terminus | Southern Terminus |
|---|---|---|---|---|---|---|---|
| 1 | Camino El Bolo | Hiking Info | Longest trail; essentially a loop trail over Cerro El Bolo; Connects to PR-561 | 3.0 miles (4.8 km) | Connects to trails # 3 and #6 | PR-143, Northeast of the Visitors Center | Visitors Center, PR-143, Km 32.4 |
| 2 | Camino Ortolaza | --- | Closed | --- | Closed | Closed | Closed |
| 3 | Camino to Observation Tower | Hiking Lookout | Tower altitude: 3,537 ft above sea level. Hike to the top of Cerro Doña Juana | 0.60 miles (0.97 km) | One way trail; Very slippery slopes | Observation Tower | Trail #1 |
| 4 | Camino Vega Grande | --- | Closed | --- | Closed | Closed | Closed |
| 5 | Camino Las Cuarenta | Hiking | Second longest trail (2.95 mi), if hikes on State Roads PR-564 and PR-143 are included | 0.90 miles (1.45 km) | Poorly maintained | PR-564, Water Pumping Station | Trail #8 |
| 6 | Camino to Pool | Hiking Swimming Diving or Snorkeling picnic | Pool and Picnic areas | 0.80 miles (1.29 km) | Well maintained; Pool open during summer months only | PR-143 | Trail #1 |
| 7 | Camino to Area de Acampar | Hiking Camping Nearby picnic Info | Camping Area | 0.10 miles (0.16 km) | Paved road to the camping/picnic area | Camping Area | Visitors' Center, PR-143, Km 32.4 |
| 8 | Camino to Charco La Confesora | Hiking Swimming Diving or Snorkeling | La Confesora Pond | 0.54 miles (0.87 km) | Small Waterfall and Pool of deep pristine blue water | Charco La Confesora | Trail #7, Camping Area |
| 9 | Camino Doña Petra | Hiking | Connects to State Road PR-564 | 0.40 miles (0.64 km) | Muddy Trail | PR-564 | Bridge at Camping Area |
| 10 | Camino El Tabonuco | --- | Closed | --- | Closed | Closed | Closed |
| 11 | T9-to-T5 Connector | --- | Closed | --- | Closed | Closed | Closed |

Key to icons:
– Indicates a Hiking trail area
– Indicates Camping area
– Indicates a Picnic area
– Indicates Diving or Snorkeling area
– Indicates Fishing area
– Indicates Swimming area
– Indicates a Lookout tower
– Indicates Visitors' Center

==== Trail #1 ("El Bolo") ====
Named Camino El Bolo, it is the forest's longest trail, about 2 miles (3.2 km) long, and essentially a loop around Cerro El Bolo. This trail has its course along Cerro El Bolo (El Bolo Mountain), Puerto Rico's tenth tallest peak at 3,527 feet (1,075 m) above sea level. It is a low challenge trail. It is essentially a loop that starts at the visitors' parking area on PR-143 and terminates on PR-143 about 0.40 kilometers (0.25 mi) north of the visitors' parking area, from where hikers simply walk the road back to the parking area. Starting off at the visitors' parking area, hikers cross PR-143 to head south on the trail. This section of the forest has many banana trees and flowers along its way and starts off with a steep uphill climb. Approximately 0.4 miles (0.64 km) into the trail, the trail starts to head East and flattens out as it becomes a rocky at first and then grassy further on. Another 0.4 miles (0.64 km) heading East the trail connects to Trail #6 which leads to the swimming pool. Continuing East another 0.2 miles (0.32 km), the trail becomes uphill again as it connects to the northernmost point of a paved road, Puerto Rico Highway 561, on the right hand side. From this point on the trail starts to head North on a downhill grade but in less than 0.1 miles (0.16 km) it connects to Trail #3 which leads to the Observation Tower, where there is a sign that reads La Torre ("The Tower"). The trail continuous downhill North-Northwest about 0.8 miles (1.3 km) until it reaches paved road PR-143, in the vicinity of km 32.6. From this point hikers make a left to walk southwest bound on PR-143 (that is, "West" on PR-143) until reaching the visitors' area at km 32.4.

==== Trail #3 (Observation Tower) ====
This trail leads to the Observation Tower. This trail if for advanced hikers. Trail #3 does not start at the visitors' parking area, so hikers must first hike on other trails to get to Trail #3. Starting from the visitors' parking area, there are three ways to get to Trail #3. Path Option 1: This is the shortest route. Hikers get on PR-143, walking northeast bound (that is, making a left from the parking area to head "East" on PR-143) about 0.40 kilometers (0.25 mi), make a right into the forest at the sign ("Verada #6 - Piscina") to get on Trail #6, hike the 1.3-kilometer (0.8 mi) of Trail #6 to its end, make a left into Trail #1 and hike about 0.48 kilometers (0.3 mi) to the beginning of Trail #3. Path Option 2: This is the second shortest route. Hikers take Trail #1 as described above under section "Trail #1" until they reach Trail #3 where there is a sign that reads "Observation Tower". Path Option 3: This is the longest route. Hikers head northeast bound (that is, "East" on PR-143) passed the sign stating "Trail #6 - La Piscina (this will be about 0.40-kilometer (0.25 mi) hike), and continue northeast bound for approximately another 0.40 kilometers (0.25 mi) until the sign stating "Trail #1 - Camino Bolo where hikers make a right into the forest and continue this trail about 1.4 kilometers (0.9 mi) until coming to Trail #3.

Once on Trail #3, hikers climb this trail about 0.97 kilometers (0.6 mi) to its top where the observation tower is located. The trail to the observation tower lookout hill is not for the faint of heart. It is very steep and very slippery. It is a one-way trail (in the sense that the same trail is used in the return trip) and the trail feels even more slippery in the downhill return hike. This trail is made of rocks but, because of the high humidity and low traffic, algae have overtaken the rocks to make the trail very slippery. Walking around the rocks does not always help as the area is muddy - though albeit less slippery. The view and fresh air and breeze make the trek quite rewarding. The views are unobstructed and panoramic 360° views are possible. The tower is 3,537 feet above sea level. Altogether the distance from the visitors' parking area to the tower is 3.44-kilometer (2.14 mi).

==== Trail #5 ("Las Cuarenta") ====
Trail #5 is about 1.4-kilometer (0.9 mi) long and is a medium challenge trail. There is a significant amount of mud on this trail, but less so in the dry season months of December through March and June through July. To reach this trail from the visitors' parking area hikers must first head northbound to trek the entire length of Trail #7 (the Camping Area trail, 0.16-kilometer (0.1 mi) long), cross the bridge over the Doña Juana Creek and then hop on Trail #8. From this point on Trail #8, hikers head West for about 0.32 kilometers (0.2 mi) where Trail #5 begins; its entrance is located on the right hand side. The trail heads North and leads to Puerto Rico Highway 564. The first segment of the trail runs downhill for 1.4 kilometers (0.9 mi). The trail runs a thick tropical jungle of banana trees, sierra palms, tree ferns, flamboyant trees, and elephant ears. The trail is muddy, steep, and scantily-marked. Visibility is minimal through the dense foliage. There are several creeks near this trail and birds are abundant: black-throated blue warblers, northern parulas, green mangos, Cape May warblers, belted kingfishers, among others. After the 1.4-kilometer (0.9 mi) trek, the trail reaches PR-564. There is water pumping station on the left. From this point the "trail" turns right, as PR-564 is intended to be part of the trail. Hikers walk South on PR-564 for 0.97 kilometers (0.6 mi) where the northern terminus of Trail #9 (the Doña Petra trail) is located to the right. Continuing southbound on PR-564 for another 0.16-kilometer (0.1 mi), the road trail meets PR-143, where hikers turn right to continue South on Trail #5. From this point hikers walk another 0.40-kilometer (0.25 mi) to arrive at the visitors' parking area on the right side of the road. Considering the hikes on Trails #7 and #8 plus the hikes on roads PR-564 and PR-143, Trail #5 is 4.75 kilometers (2.95 mi) long, making it the second longest hike of all of Toro Negro's trails.

==== Trail #6 (The Pool) ====
This trail is about 0.80 kilometers (0.5 mi) long and a low challenge trail. The trail is well maintained, but the natural pool that it leads to is open during summer months only. Starting from the visitors' parking area, hikers get on PR-143 walking northeast bound (that is, making a left from the parking area to head "East" on PR-143) about 0.40 kilometers (0.25 mi), then make a right into the forest at the sign ("Verada #6 - Piscina") to get on Trail #6. This trail runs along a river for about 0.40 kilometers (0.25 mi) before it comes to the sign "Piscina" pointing left. Continuing south on the trail, there are two eye-catching waterfalls visible from the trail. Continuing southbound and uphill, the trail goes through two flat and open areas with picnic tables. After this, the trail continues uphill and southbound for about 0.97 kilometers (0.6 mi) where it comes to its end, reaching Trail #1. Once at Trail #1, hikers either make a left or a right to get onto Trail #1 (trail #1 is a loop trail) or, of course, may turn around to return to the parking area via Trail #6. The entire length of Trail #6 is 1.3 kilometers (0.8 mi).

==== Trail #7 (Camping Area) ====
This trail is actually a paved forest road leading to the Los Viveros camping area, Toro Negro State Forest's only campground. It is located north of the parking area. The "trail" is only 0.16-kilometer (0.1 mi) long, wide and flat, thus a low challenge trail. The trail is also the connecting trail to Trail #8, which leads to Charco La Confesora (see below). Another use of this trail is that it leads to one of the forest's three official picnic areas. Its picnic area is the one closes to the visitors' parking area. The Doña Juana Creek runs next to the picnic area.

==== Trail #8 ("Charco La Confesora") ====
This trail is 0.87-kilometer (0.54 mi) long, it is a medium challenge trail, and leads to El Charco ("The Pond"), a natural swimming hole. It is located north of the parking area, and starts at the end of Trail #7. After hiking north from the parking area on Trail #7 (Trail #7 is a 0.16-kilometer (0.1 mi) long paved road), and hiking by the camping area, Trail #7 comes to an end at the Doña Juana Creek. There is a sign pointing West (Charco Confesora) near the picnic area next to the camping area that serves as a landmark. At this point hikers walk over a little bridge to cross the creek, where Trail #8 begins. The trail heads northwest along the creek (the creek is located to the left of the trail) and the trail is abundant with wild flowers. It is a downhill trail and a bit muddy. A section of the trail consists of concrete steps. At the end of the trail is Charco La Confesora, a natural "pool", with a waterfall as a backdrop. swimming is allowed at this charco. The return path is the same as the path to the charco as the trail terminates at the charco.

==== Trail #9 ("Doña Petra") ====
This trail is 0.64-kilometer (0.4 mi) long, it is a medium challenge trail. Like Trail #5, it is located north of the parking area, and starts where Trail #7 end. Also, like trail #5, there is a significant amount of mud on this trail, though less so during the dry season months of December through March and June through July. To reach this trail from the visitors' parking area hikers must first head northbound to trek the entire length of Trail #7 (the Camping Area trail, 0.16-kilometer (0.1 mi) long) and cross the bridge over the Doña Juana Creek. Trail #9 begins at this bridge. Heading to the left from the bridge is the path for Trail #8, but heading straight up (northbound) gets hikers onto Trail #9, the Doña Petra Trail. (Like trail #5, the "Las Cuarenta" trail, Trail #9 will also bring the hiker to State Route PR-564, but being a shorter trail, it does not encounter PR-564 as far north as Trail #5 does.) The first segment of the trail runs downhill for 0.32-kilometer (0.2 mi), where according to ranger office maps, there used to be a trail to the left (i.e., westbound) leading to Trail #5. However, vegetation apparently overran such connecting trail because it is no longer visible. The trail then continues another 0.32-kilometer (0.2 mi) where it reaches PR-564. From this point the "trail" turns right, as PR-564 is intended to be part of the trail. Hikers walk South on PR-564 for 0.16-kilometer (0.1 mi) where the "road trail" meets PR-143. At State Route PR-143 hikers turn right to continue South on Trail #9. From this point hikers walk another 0.40-kilometer (0.25 mi) to arrive at the visitors' parking area on the right side of the road. Considering the hikes on Trail #7 and roads PR-564 and PR-143, Trail #9 is 1.21-kilometer (0.75 mi) long.

==== Trails #2, #4, and #10 ====
Trails #2, #4 and #10 are no longer active trails. Trail #2 was called Camino Ortolaza and was 0.80-kilometer (0.5 mi) long. It was a "one-way" trail (i.e., same entrance and exit) and ran from PR-143 to the Doña Juana Creek. It started on PR-143 some 0.40-kilometer (0.25 mi) west of the entrance to the Area Recreativa/visitors' parking area and headed North ending at the Doña Juana Creek, about 0.32-kilometer (0.2 mi) west of Charco La Confesora. Trail #4 was called Camino Vega Grande and was 0.64-kilometer (0.4 mi) long. It was another "one-way" trail and began on PR-143 about 0.16-kilometer (0.1 mi) east of the current Trail #1 eastern terminus. Trail #10 was called Camino El Tabonuco and was about 0.32-kilometer (0.2 mi) long. It was also a "one-way" trail. It originated at km 32.3 on PR-143 and headed north into the forest.

==== Trail #11 (T9-to-T5 Connector) ====
An unnamed trail, but referenced and marked in the DRNA maps, is a trail that could be termed Trail #11 for referential purposes. It was located midway on Trail #9 (that is, about 0.32-kilometer (0.2 mi) west of PR-546) and headed north to Trail #5. It met Trail #9 at a point about 0.32-kilometer (0.2 mi) west of PR-546. This trail was about 0.48-kilometer (0.3 mi) long. It served the double purpose of acting as a nature trail while at the same time it connected Trails 5 and 9, thus making for a shortcut from Trail #5 back to the car parking area via Trail #9. DRNA considers this unnamed trail a part of (an offshoot of) Trail #5.

=== Campgrounds ===
Highest peaks at Toro Negro
- Cerro de Punta
- Monte Jayuya – 2nd highest at Toro Negro

Highest point
- Elevation: 1,296 m (4,252 ft)
- Prominence: 2nd highest peak in Puerto Rico
- Coordinates: 18°10′40″N 66°31′56″W

Geography
- Location: Ponce & Jayuya
- Parent range: Cordillera Central

Climbing
- Easiest route: PR-143, km 18.2
- Cerro Rosa – 3rd highest at Toro Negro

Highest point
- Elevation: 1,263 m (4,144 ft)
- Prominence: 3rd highest peak in Puerto Rico
- Coordinates: 18°10′40″N 66°31′56″W

Geography
- Location: Ciales & Jayuya
- Parent range: Cordillera Central

Climbing
- Easiest route: End of PR-539 South, then Hike
- Cerro Maravilla – 4th highest at Toro Negro

Highest point
- Elevation: 1,205 m (3,953 ft)
- Prominence: 5th highest peak in Puerto Rico; Site of Cerro Maravilla murders
- Coordinates: 18°9′11″N 66°33′15″W

Geography
- Location: Ponce, Puerto Rico
- Parent range: Cordillera Central

Climbing
- Easiest route: PR-577, km 0.5
- Cerro El Bolo – 5th highest at Toro Negro

Highest point
- Elevation: 1,075 m (3,527 ft)
- Prominence: 10th highest peak in Puerto Rico
- Coordinates: 18°9′11″N 66°33′15″W

Geography
- Location: Villalba, Puerto Rico
- Parent range: Cordillera Central

Climbing
- Easiest route: PR-143, km 32.4
- Cerro Doña Juana – 6th highest at Bosque Estatal de Toro Negro

Highest point
- Elevation: 1,058 m (3,471 ft)
- Prominence: 12th highest peak in Puerto Rico
- Coordinates: 18°9′11″N 66°33′15″W

Geography
- Location: Orocovis, Puerto Rico
- Parent range: Cordillera Central

Climbing
- Easiest route: PR-143, km 32.4

The campgrounds (camping area) at Toro Negro is called Los Viveros. It is located on PR-143, Km 32.5. Its coordinates are at 18.17502°N, 66.49202°W (18°10′30.0714″N 66°29′31.2714″W). Camping is available for a maximum of 35 people. Camping facilities include restrooms and showers. A permit is required for camping and they are purchased in advance, as there are no permit sales on premises. In the proximity of the campgrounds there is also a picnic area. It has six picnic shelters with covered BBQ, on-site water, and a spot for a campfire.

=== Lakes and water sports ===
Lake El Guineo and Lake Matrullas are both man-made reservoirs. Fishing, boating and kayaking is allowed at the El Guineo and Matrullas reservoirs. Lake El Guineo is located at 18.1579°N 66.5284°W (18°9′28.44″N 66°31′42.24″W), at an altitude of 3,002 feet above sea level. It is located between the municipalities of Ciales and Orocovis, west of the Doña Juana Recreation Area, on PR-143 at km 25.4. The lowest temperatures recorded on the Puerto Rico—some 40 °F (4 °C) -- were measured at Lake Guineo. Lake Matrullas is located at 18.2064°N 66.4798°W (18°12′23.0394″N 66°28′47.2794″W), at an altitude of 2,464 feet above sea level. It too is between the municipalities of Ciales and Orocovis. It is located northeast of the Doña Juana Recreation Area, on PR-564 at km 6.1. The Puerto Rico DRNA allows the use of kayaks in Lake Matrullas. The ambiance is cool and misty. Both lakes are all well stocked with Peacock and Largemouth bass. Creeks are abundant in the area, and in addition to the Quebrada Doña Juana, the forest also has a number of other creeks, such as Quebrada Rosa.

=== Observation tower ===
The observation tower, accessible only on foot via Trail #3, rises at 3,537 feet above sea level, making it the highest manmade point on the island. The observation tower sits atop Cerro Doña Juana, Puerto Rico's 11th highest peak at 3,474 feet (1,059 m) above sea level. The tower's coordinates are 18.17178°N, 66.48091°W (18°10′18.4074″N 66°28′51.2754″W). The tower is used for observation of the landscape surrounding Toro Negro and, on clear mornings before the afternoon clouds roll in, both the northern and southern shores of Puerto Rico are visible. San Juan is also visible as a distant haze in the northeastern horizon. The observation tower affords views Lake El Guineo and Lake Guayabal as well as the Caribbean Sea. It was built by the Spaniards during colonial times as a lookout tower to protect the south coast of the Island.

=== Charcos ===
Charcos are natural ponds, or swimming holes, formed by the mountain rivers as they fall as waterfalls onto the ground below. They are popular way of refreshing from the summer heat in the Toro Negro State Forest. The forest's "official" pool is accessed via Trail number 6, the La Piscina ("The Pool") trail. To reach trail 6, hikers start out from the forest office/parking area and hike north on route PR-143 about 2.3-kilometer (1.4 mi). Trail 6 is located on the right hand side of the road. This pool is a river-fed pool. It became deteriorated, in disrepair and closed to public use sometime prior to 2010 and, in February 2013, there were unconfirmed reports that it had been repaired and reopen. In 2008, it was reported that an agreement between DNRA and the local community had been signed whereby the community would help repair the pool. Under an agreement with the government of Puerto Rico, the municipality of Orocovis is the entity responsible for pool maintenance. In any case, this pool opens only during the summer months. The pool's water temperature is very chilled, but refreshing, given the high humidity of the area, particularly in the afternoons. La Piscina is located at 18.1713°N 66.4876°W (18°10′16.52″N 66°29′15.53″W).

A second river-fed swimming pool charco is located at Charco La Confesora. It is about 15 x 25 feet large and deep enough to dive feet first. This charco is accessed via Trail number 8, located at the end of Trail 7, the trail to the camping area. The pool at Charco La Confesora is located at 18.176901, -66.495861. (18°10′36.8436″N 66°29′45.0996″W).

=== Cerro de Punta and other peaks ===
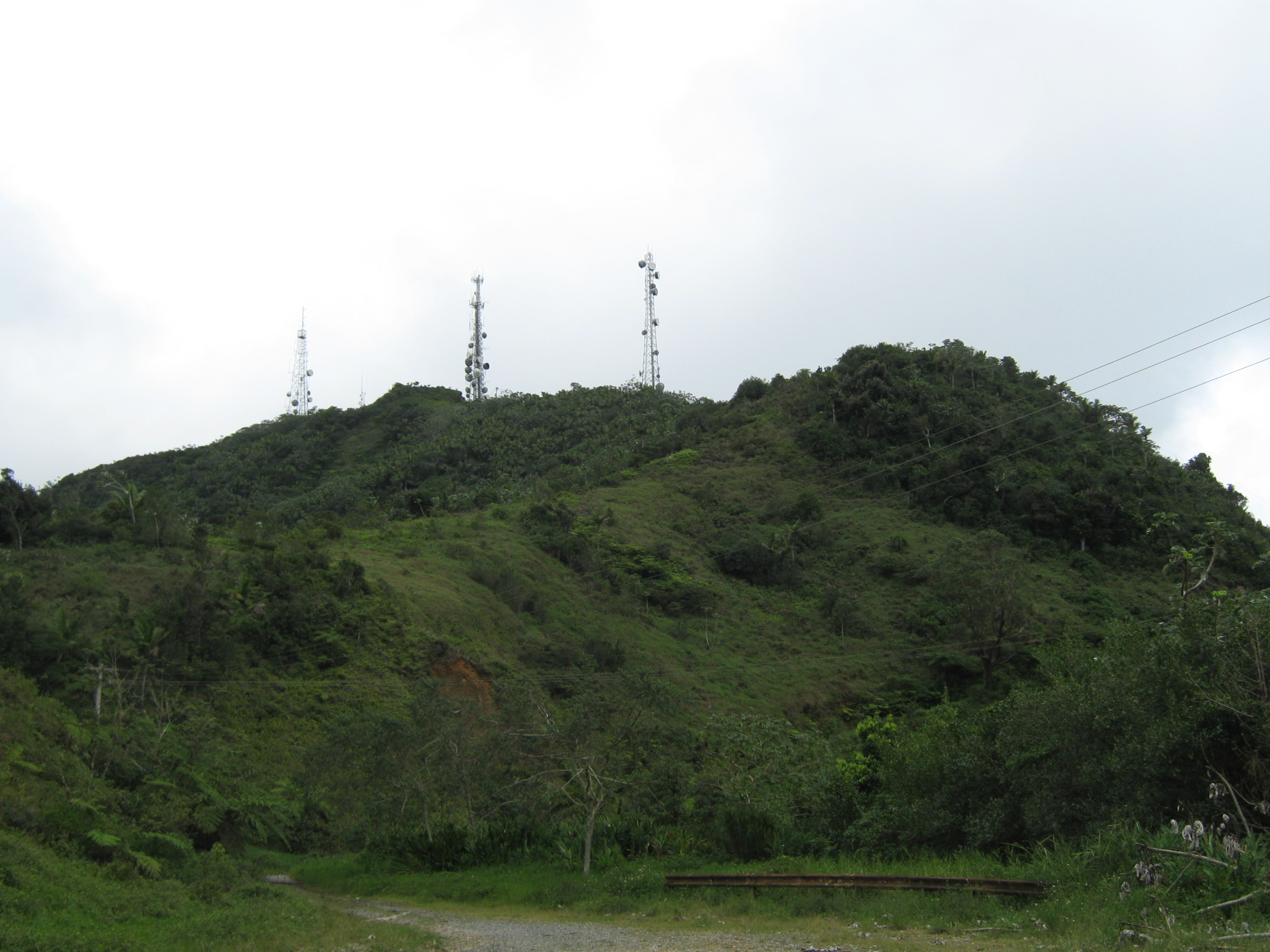
Cerro de Punta, Puerto Rico's tallest peak, located in the western segment of Toro Negro (photo taken from PR-149, near the mountain top)

The forest includes Puerto Rico's highest peak, Cerro de Punta, which is located at km. 17.0 on Puerto Rico Highway 143. It is at 18.1722°N, 66.5917°W (18°10′19.8″N 66°35′30.03″W). The mountain is the dividing landmark for the municipalities of Ponce and Jayuya. The mountain is accessible by car but the road is quite steep and many prefer to walk the road (it is about half hour's hike to the top) unless riding on an all-wheel drive vehicle. There is parking on PR-143 for those who prefer to walk to the hilltop. Another peak in the Toro Negro is Cerro Maravilla, infamous due to the murders of two independentistas youth at the hand of police in an ambush. This peak is also accessible by car from PR-143. The road leading to the top of Cerro Maravilla is PR-577 and is not as steep as that to Cerro de Punta (the Cerro de Punta road has no state signing.) This road is also much shorter, about 0.5 kilometer total length. Cerro Maravilla is located at 18.1532°N, 66.5543°W (18°9′11.6″N 66°33′15.56″W). Communications towers for radio, television, cellular and similar systems are located atop each of these peaks and armed security personnel, including police, is on the premises. However, private individuals can access both of these peaks. Overall, the Forest contains Cerro Punta, Cerro Rosa and Cerro Jayuya, which are considered to be Puerto Rico's three highest peaks. Cerro Maravilla, Cerro El Bolo, and Cerro Doña Juana are also located within the Toro Negro Forest.

== Nearby attractions ==
=== Doña Juana Falls ===
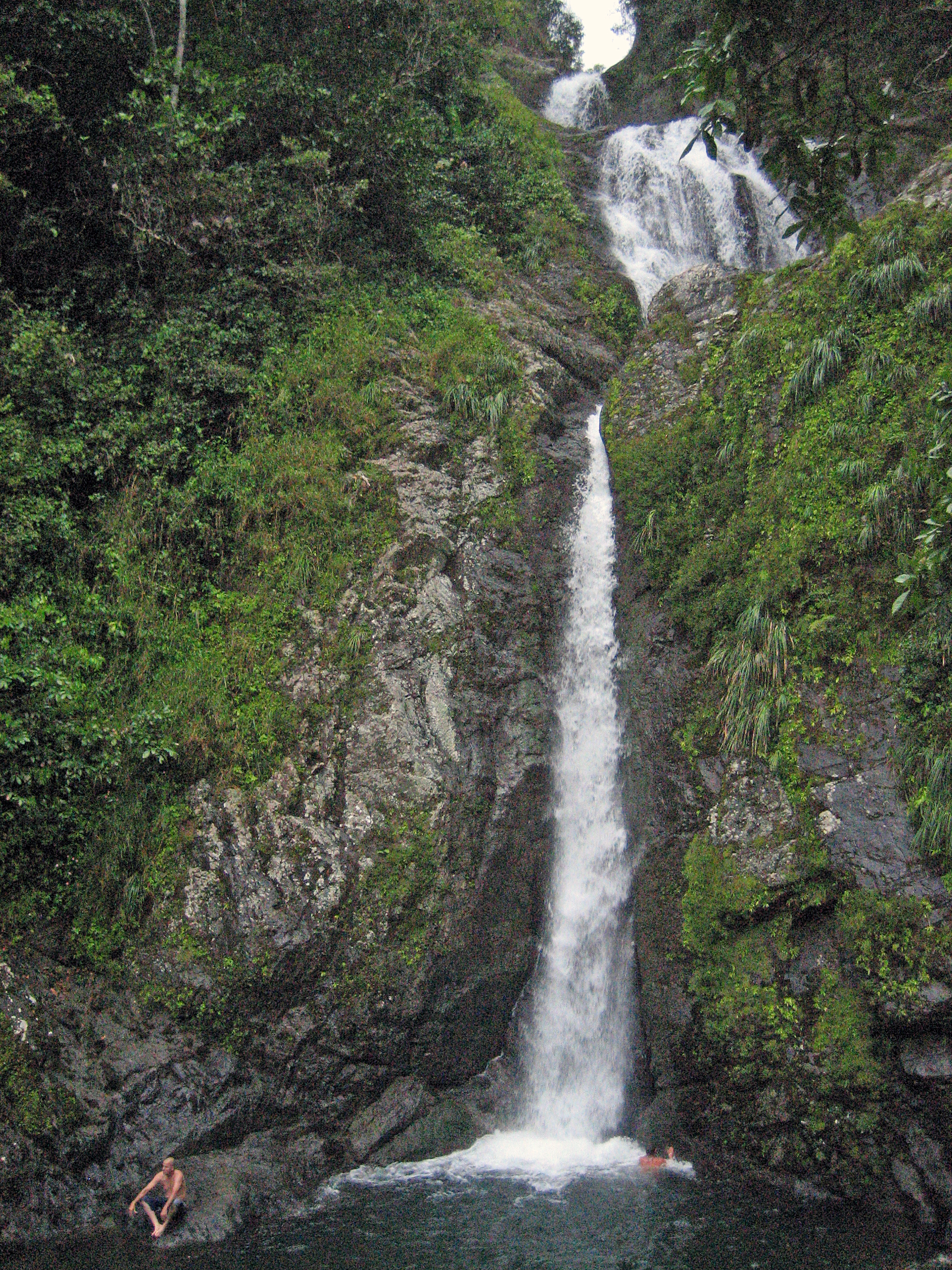
Salto Doña Juana (Doña Juana Falls)

These falls (Spanish: Salto de Doña Juana) are about 200 feet tall. They are not located within the Toro Negro State Forest itself but they are near it, requiring visitors to drive 3.9 km westbound on route PR-143 from the Doña Juana Recreational Area to reach PR-149, then drive an additional 2.3 kilometers northbound on PR-149 (towards Ciales). The falls are on PR-149 at km 41.3. They are the tallest waterfalls in Puerto Rico. Their coordinates are 18.182836, -66.512257. (18°10′58.2096″N 66°30′44.1252″W).

The falls are part of the Doña Juana Creek as it runs into Rio Toro Negro at the line that divides the municipalities of Ciales and Orocovis. The falls are very accessible, as they are viewable from the road as drivers cross the bridge of these falls. The falls fall next to the road on its eastern side and then run under the PR-149 bridge, to feed into Rio Toro Negro located a few yards on the western side of PR-149.

=== Villalba-Orocovis Lookout ===
This lookout position (known in Spanish as the Mirador Villalba-Orocovis or the Villalba-Orocovis Lookout) is located outside the Toro Negro State Forest but still on PR-143 (km 39.8) and a short distance from the forest, and it is a popular stop over for visitors to the forest. It contains picnic areas, restroom facilities and various trails. It is located at 18°10'37"N, 66°27'0"W, that is, 7.4 kilometers east of Toro Negro State Forest's Doña Juana Recreational Area.

== Climate ==
The Toro Negro State Forest is located in the cool, moist mountains of the Cordillera Central. Mean annual temperature from 19.4 to 25 °C. Temperatures are unmistakably cooler at higher elevations. Average yearly temperature is 18.4 °C (65.12 °F).

Average annual precipitation of five weather stations in and surrounding the forest ranges from 203 to 292 cm. As much as 150 inches of annual rainfall has registered at Toro Negro. The average annual rainfall is 110 inches. The months of September and May experience the most precipitation. A dry season runs from December through March. The months of June and July also tend to be dry.

Climate data for Cerro de Punta, Toro Negro Forest 4,389 feet (1,330m)
| Month | Jan | Feb | Mar | Apr | May | Jun | Jul | Aug | Sep | Oct | Nov | Dec | Year |
|---|---|---|---|---|---|---|---|---|---|---|---|---|---|
| Record high °F (°C) | 72 (22) | 75 (24) | 77 (25) | 79 (26) | 80 (27) | 83 (28) | 84 (29) | 85 (29) | 84 (29) | 82 (28) | 77 (25) | 75 (24) | 85 (29) |
| Mean daily maximum °F (°C) | 67.0 (19.4) | 68.5 (20.3) | 70.3 (21.3) | 71.4 (21.9) | 75.5 (24.2) | 80.3 (26.8) | 82.9 (28.3) | 83.9 (28.8) | 82.5 (28.1) | 77.8 (25.4) | 72.1 (22.3) | 69.7 (20.9) | 76.0 (24.4) |
| Mean daily minimum °F (°C) | 46.3 (7.9) | 45.1 (7.3) | 49.9 (9.9) | 55.2 (12.9) | 59.0 (15.0) | 61.4 (16.3) | 64.3 (17.9) | 64.9 (18.3) | 63.9 (17.7) | 59.5 (15.3) | 53.8 (12.1) | 50.0 (10.0) | 56.0 (13.3) |
| Record low °F (°C) | 28 (−2) | 34 (1) | 32 (0) | 40 (4) | 45 (7) | 50 (10) | 53 (12) | 58 (14) | 51 (11) | 44 (7) | 40 (4) | 37 (3) | 28 (−2) |
| Average precipitation inches (mm) | 7.23 (184) | 4.24 (108) | 4.05 (103) | 9.50 (241) | 12.92 (328) | 10.14 (258) | 8.29 (211) | 10.77 (274) | 14.51 (369) | 11.58 (294) | 10.04 (255) | 7.52 (191) | 120.00 (3,048) |
Source: http://www.wrcc.dri.edu/

== Gallery of flora and fauna ==
=== Flora ===
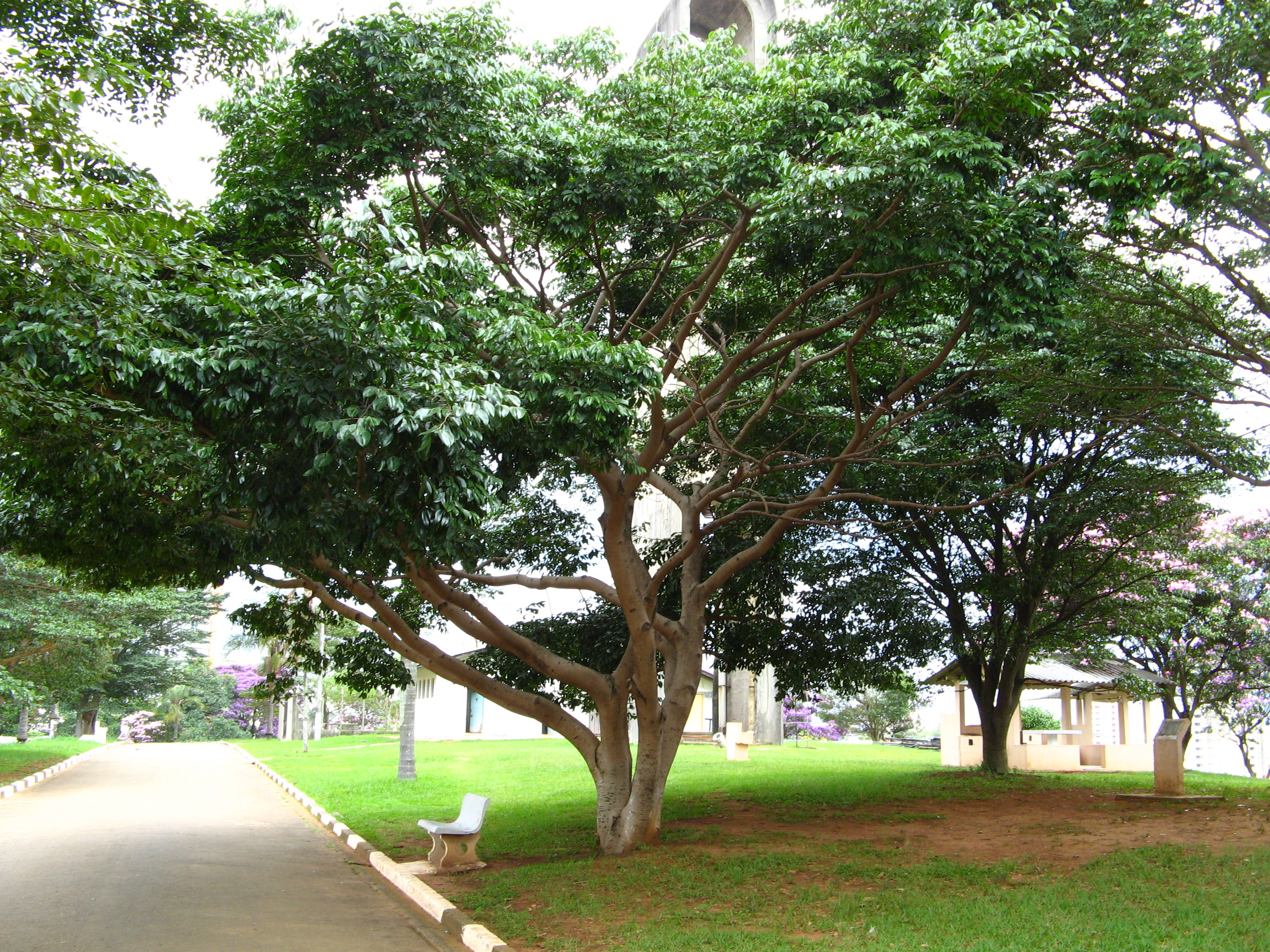
Algarrobo
(Hymenaea courbaril)

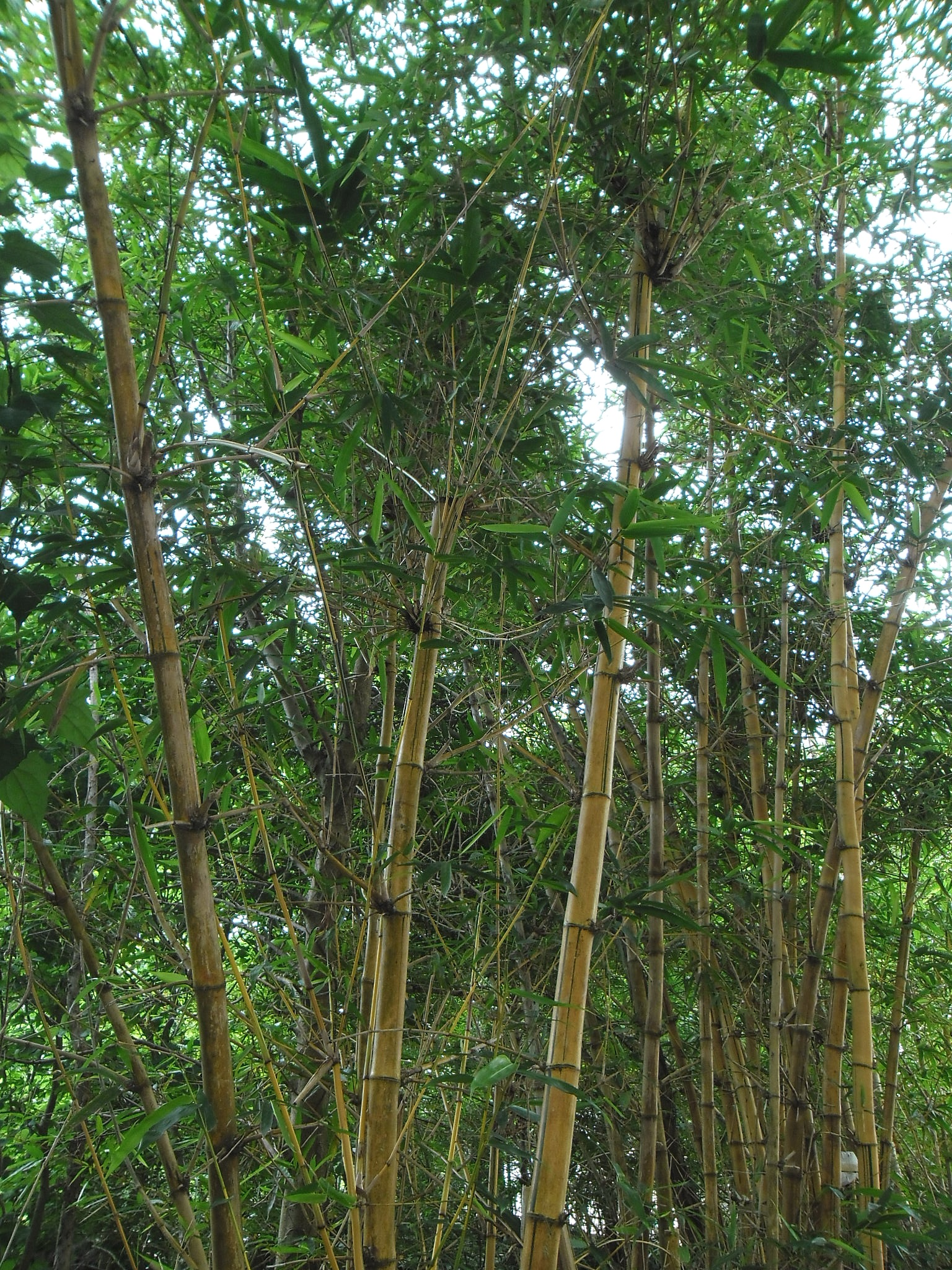
Bambú
(Bambusa vulgaris)

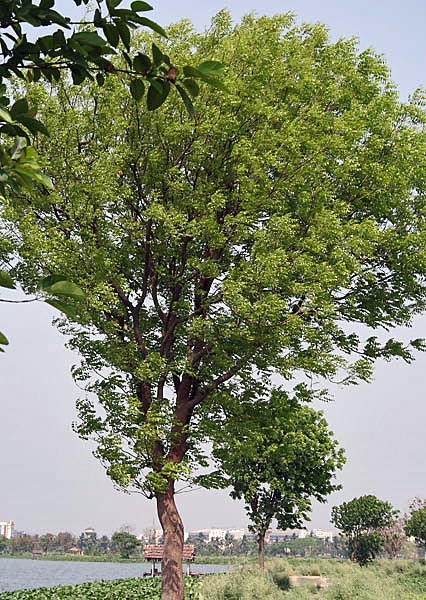
Caoba dominicana
(Swietenia mahagoni)

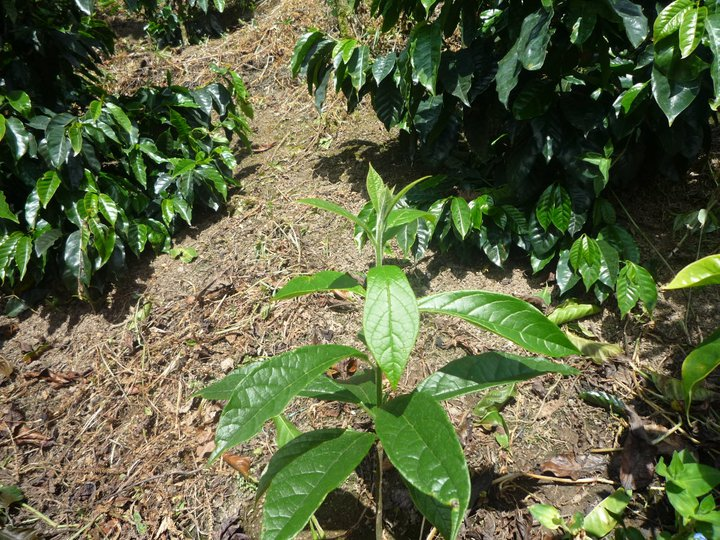
Capá prieto
(Cordia alliodora)

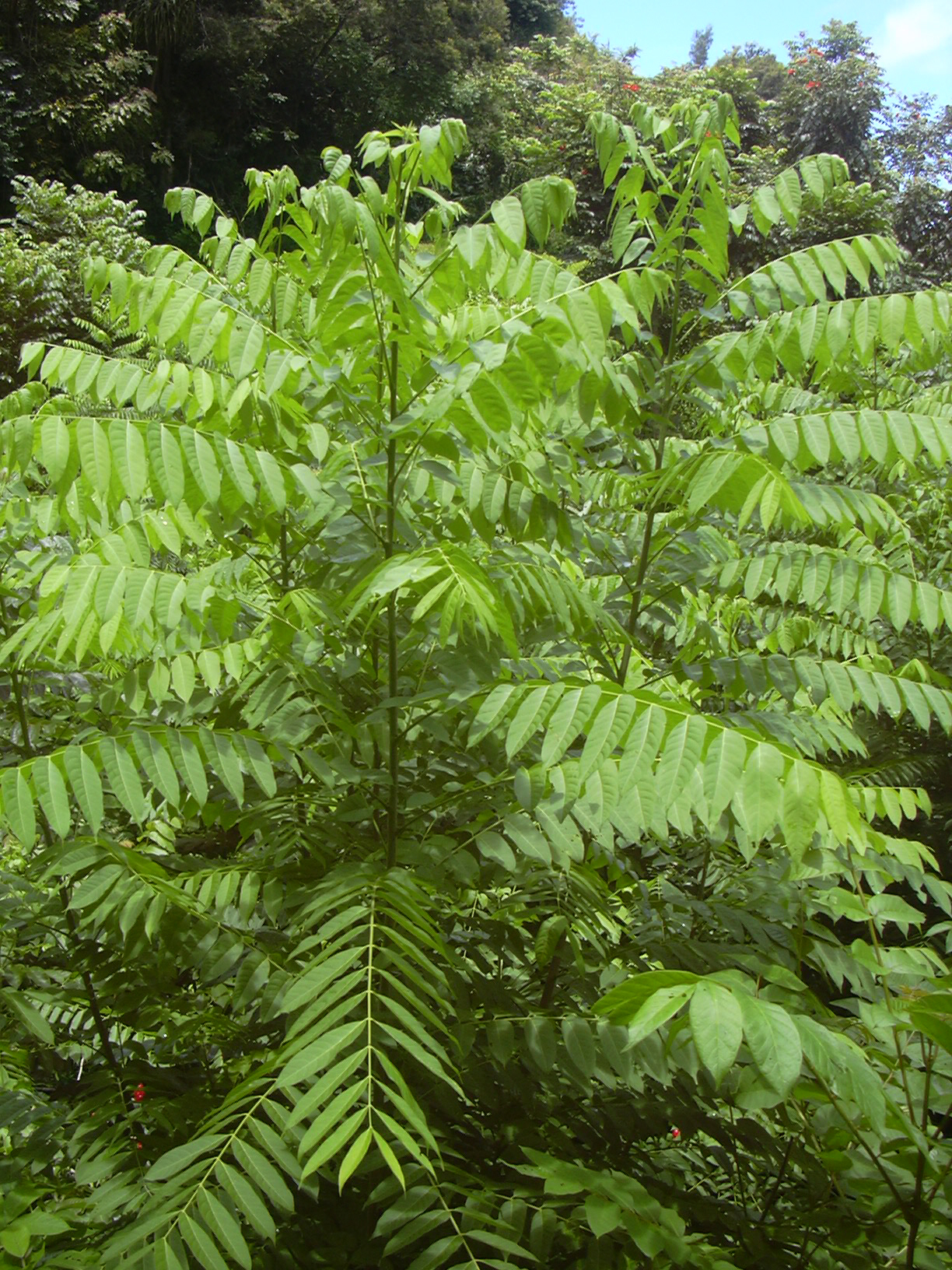
Cedro
(Cedrela odorata)

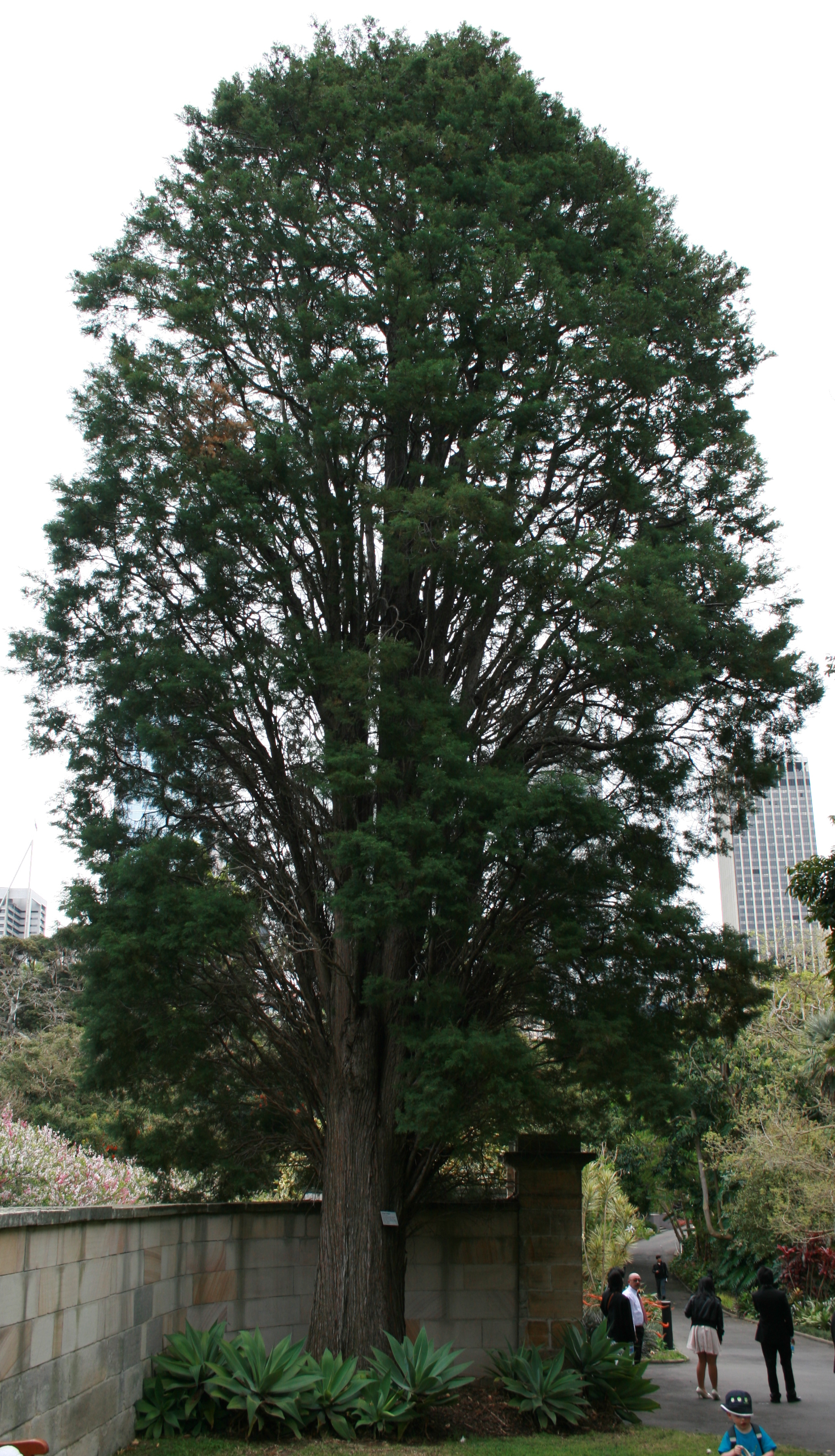
Cyprés
(Cupressus lusitanica)

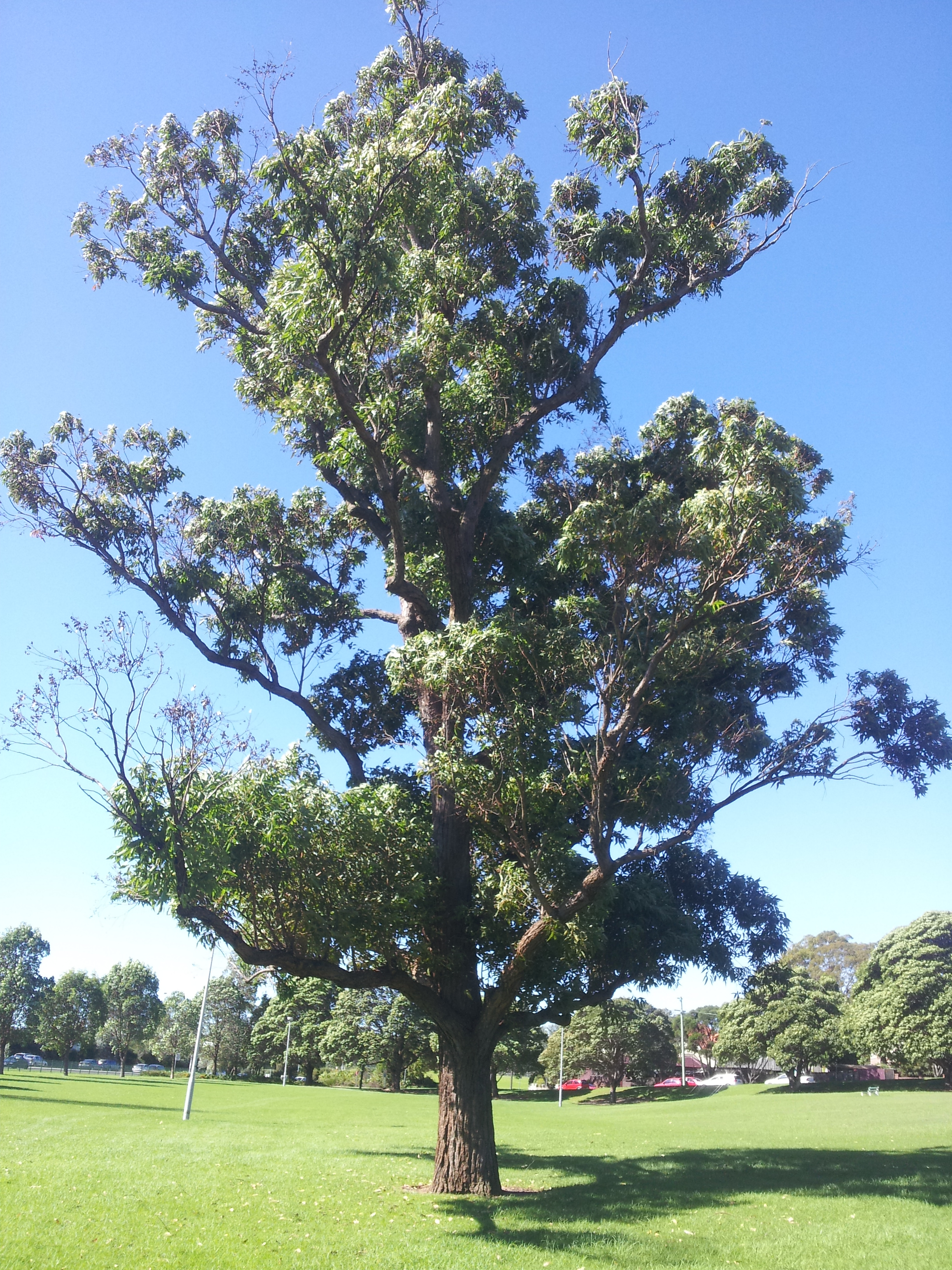
Eucalipto
(Eucalyptus robusta)

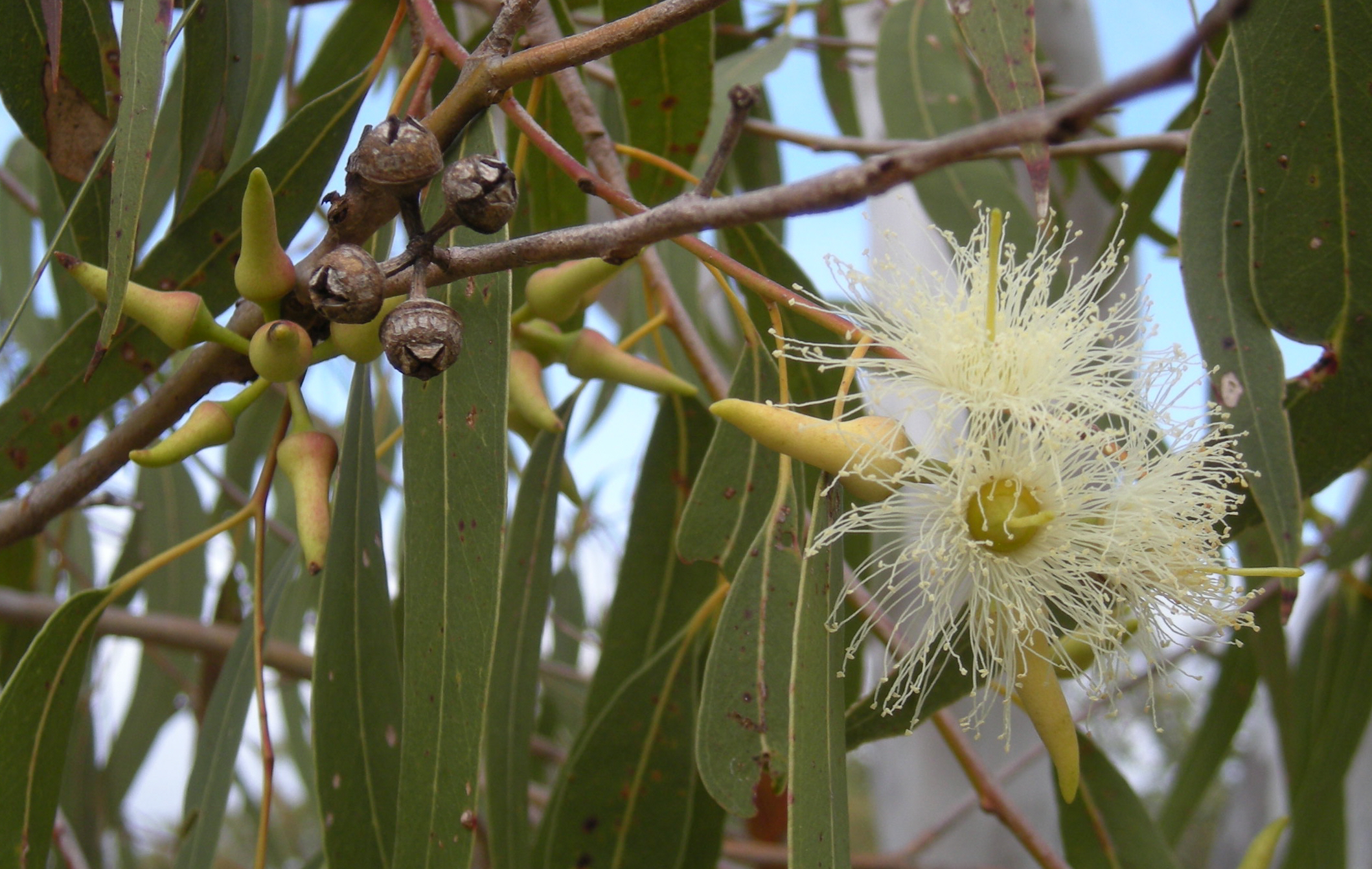
Eucalipto
(Eucalyptus tereticornis)

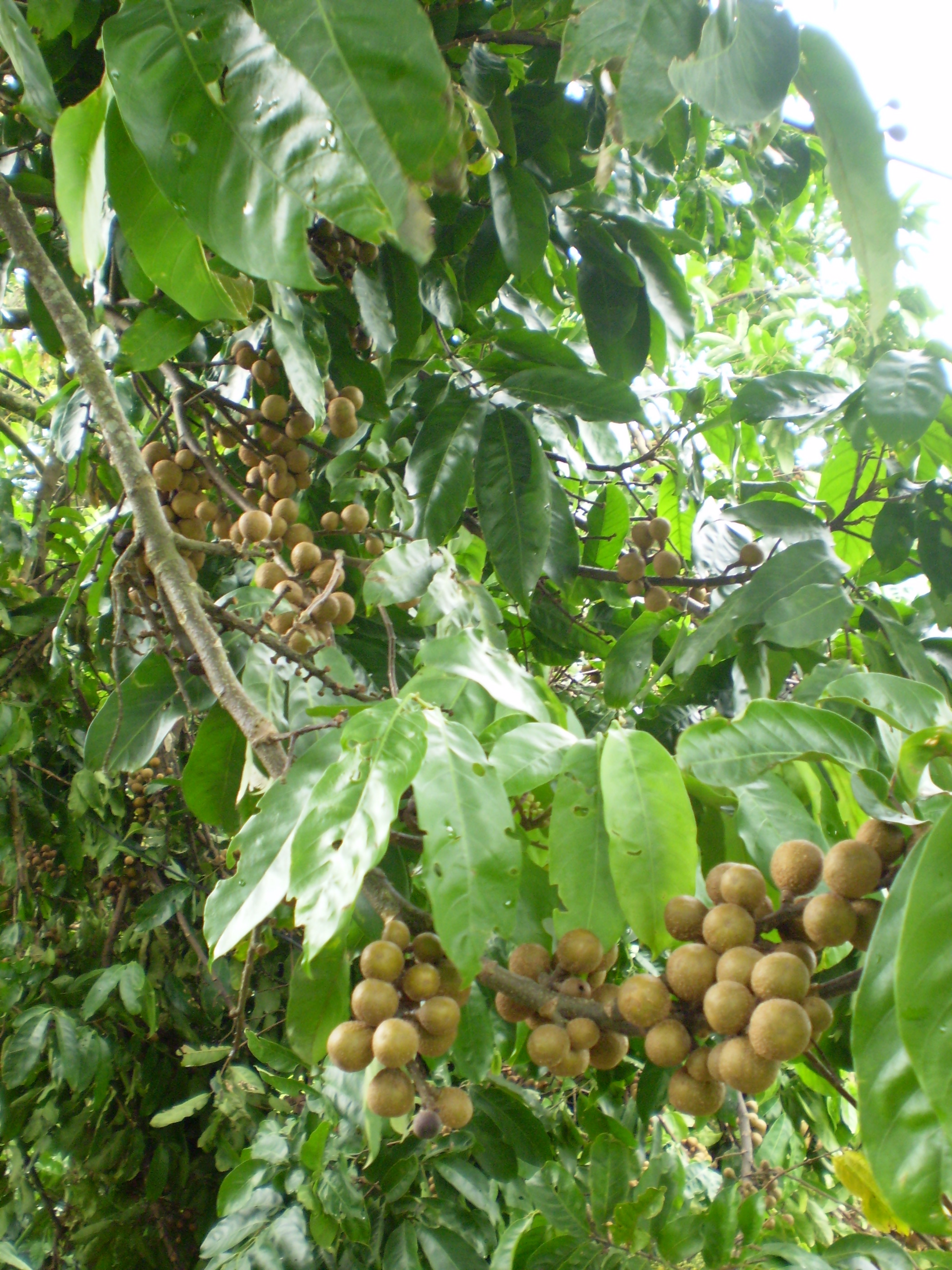
Guaraguao
(Guarea guidonia)

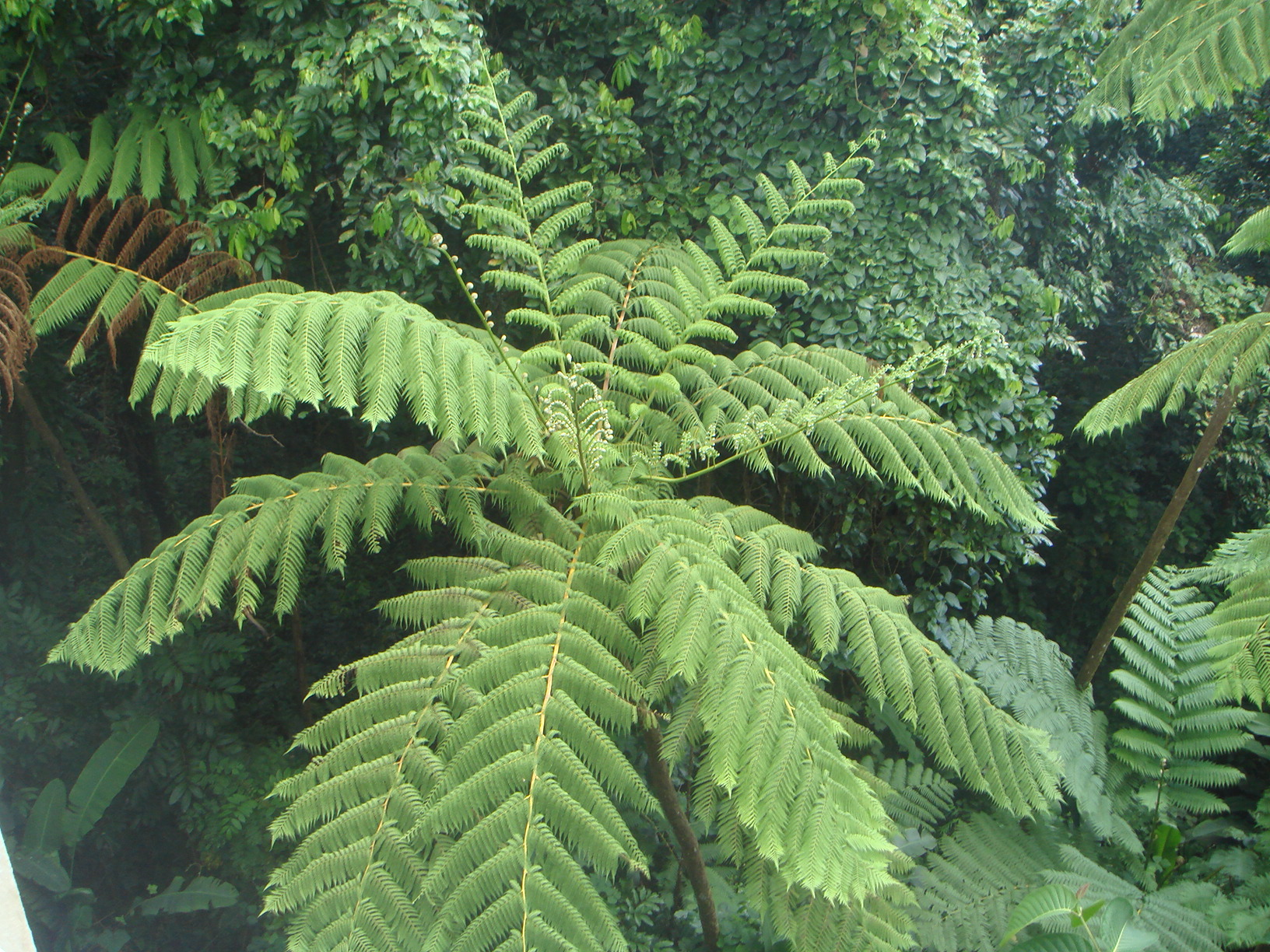
Helecho gigante
(Cyathea arborea)

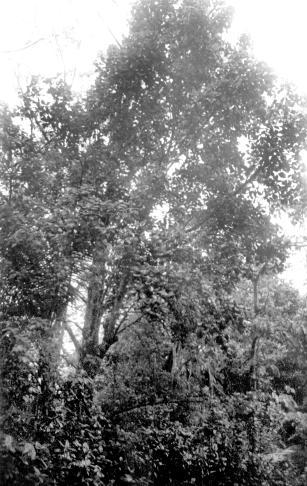
Jagüilla
(Magnolia portoricensis)

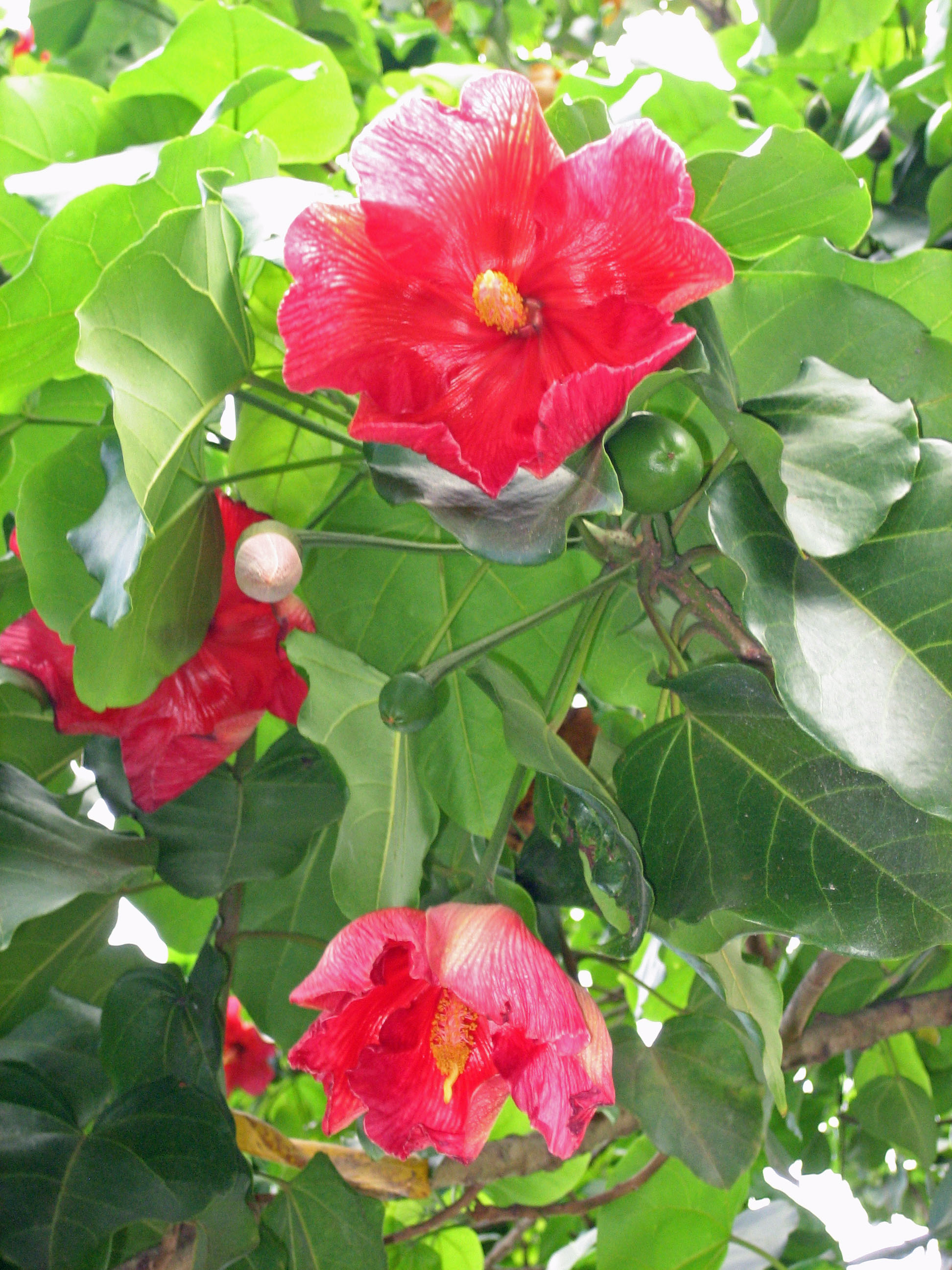
Maga
(Thespesia grandiflora)

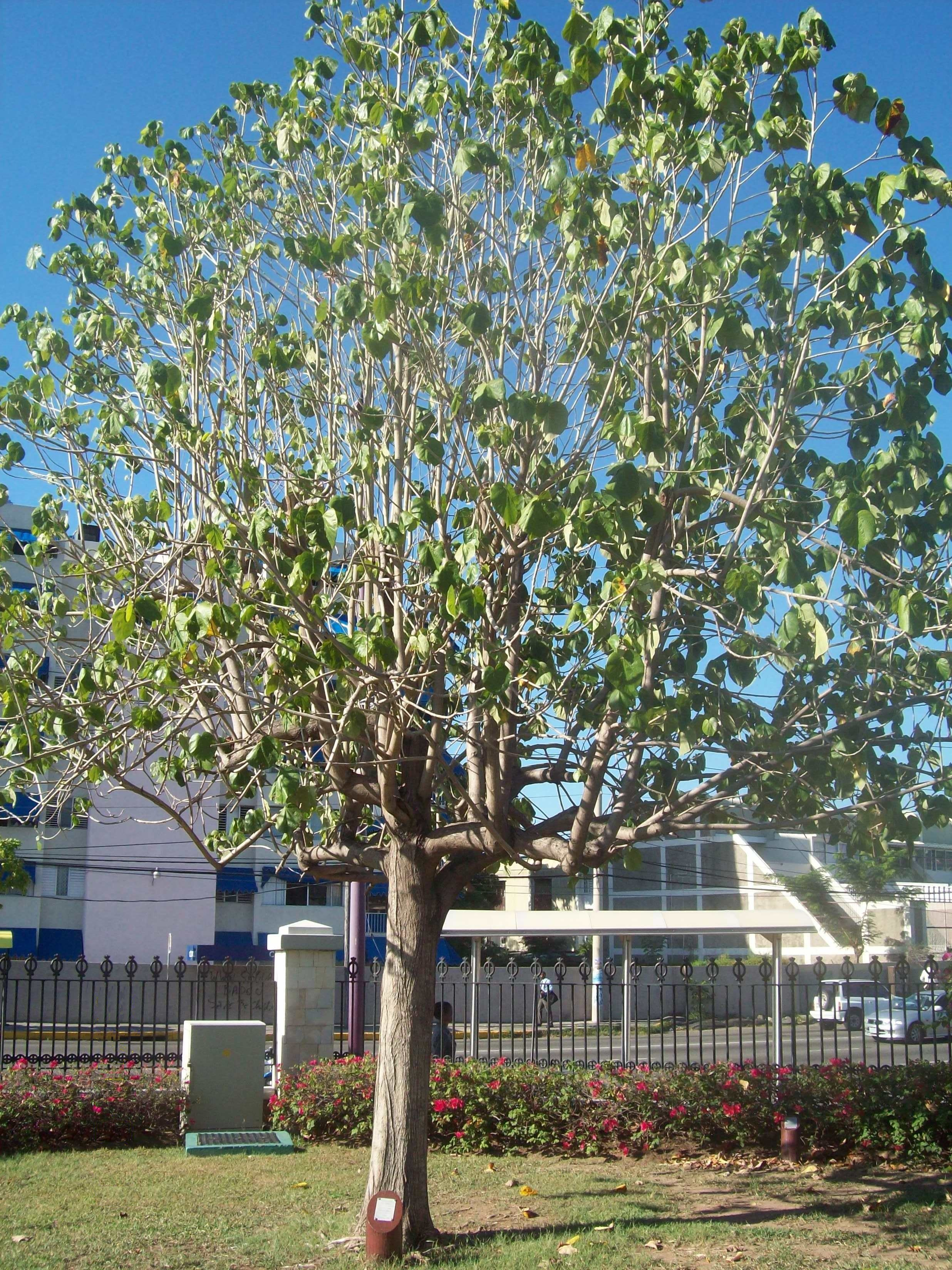
Majó
(Hibiscus elatus)

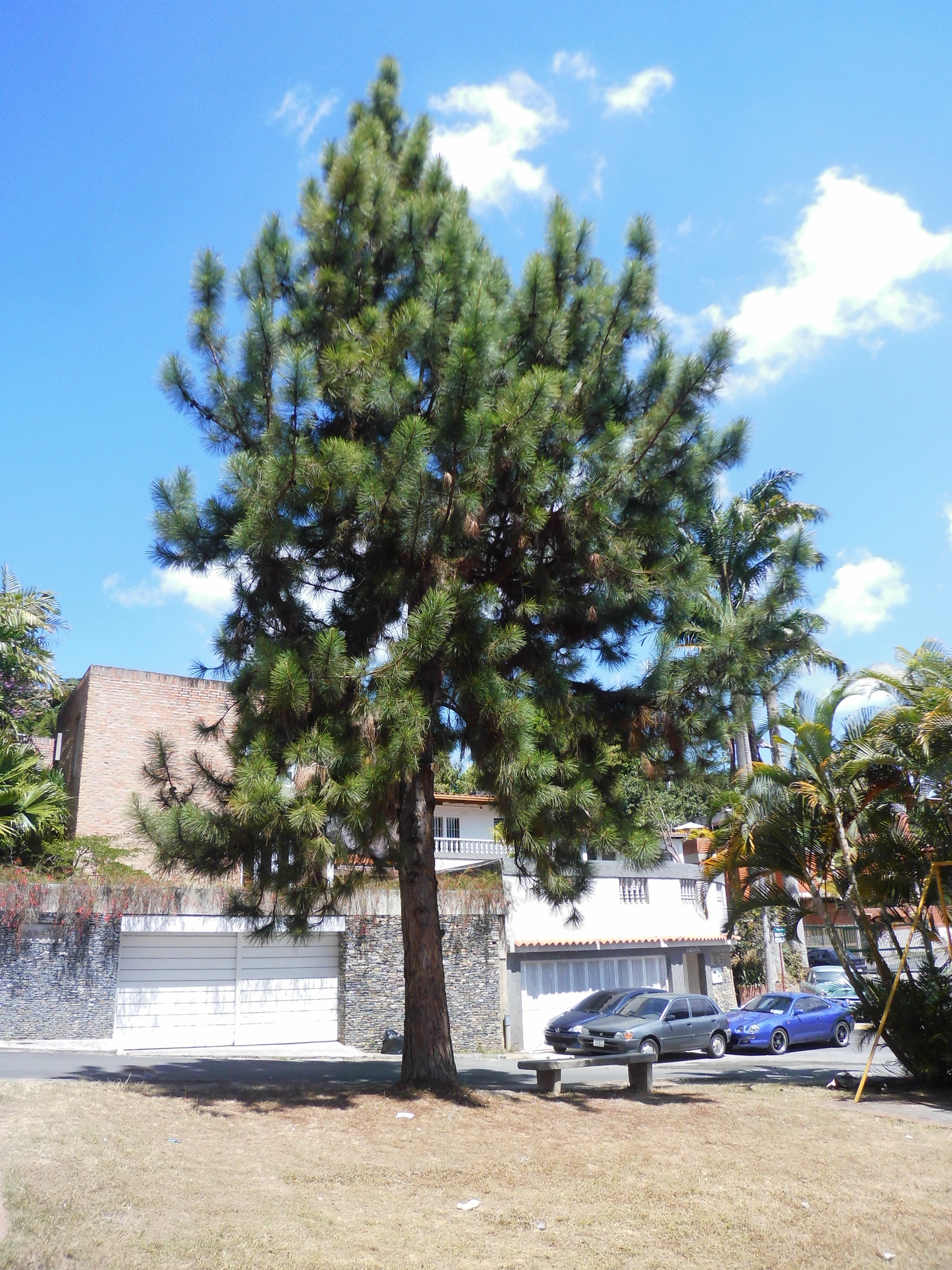
Pino Hondureño
(Pinus caribaea)

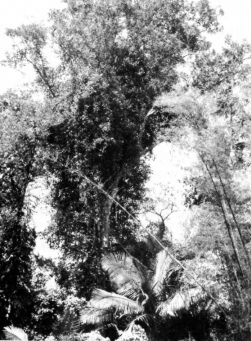
Tabonuco
(Dacryodes excelsa)

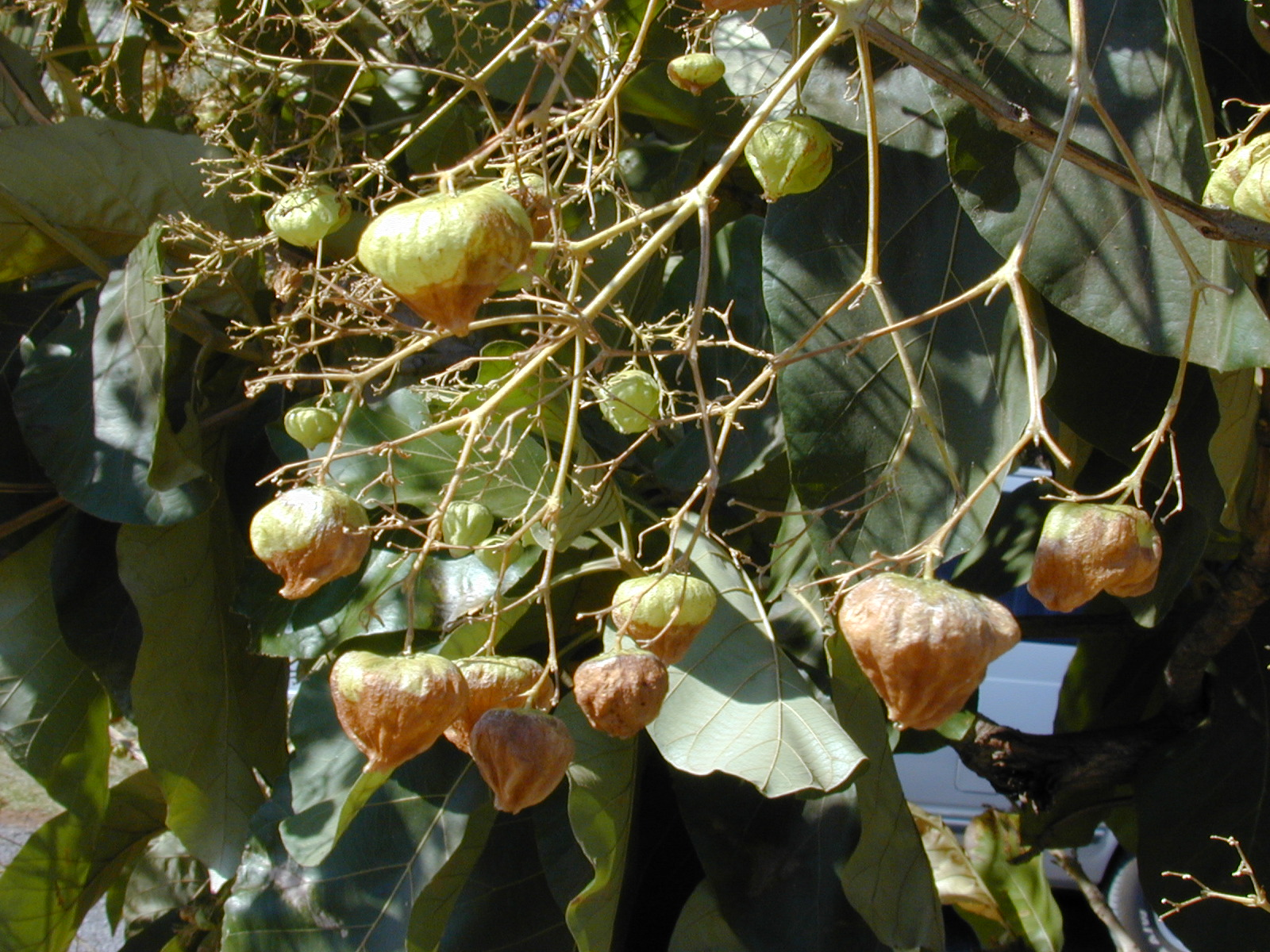
Teca
(Tectona grandis)

=== Fauna ===
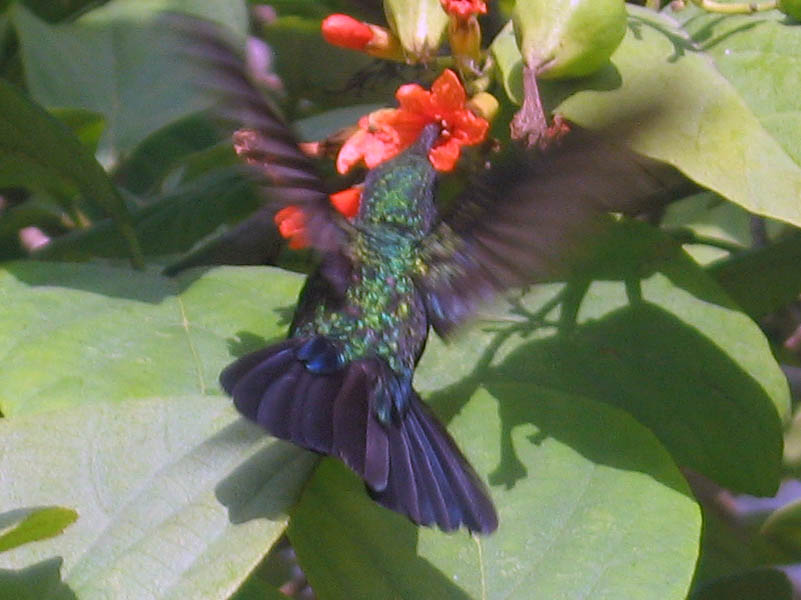
Zumbador verde
(Anthracothorax viridis)

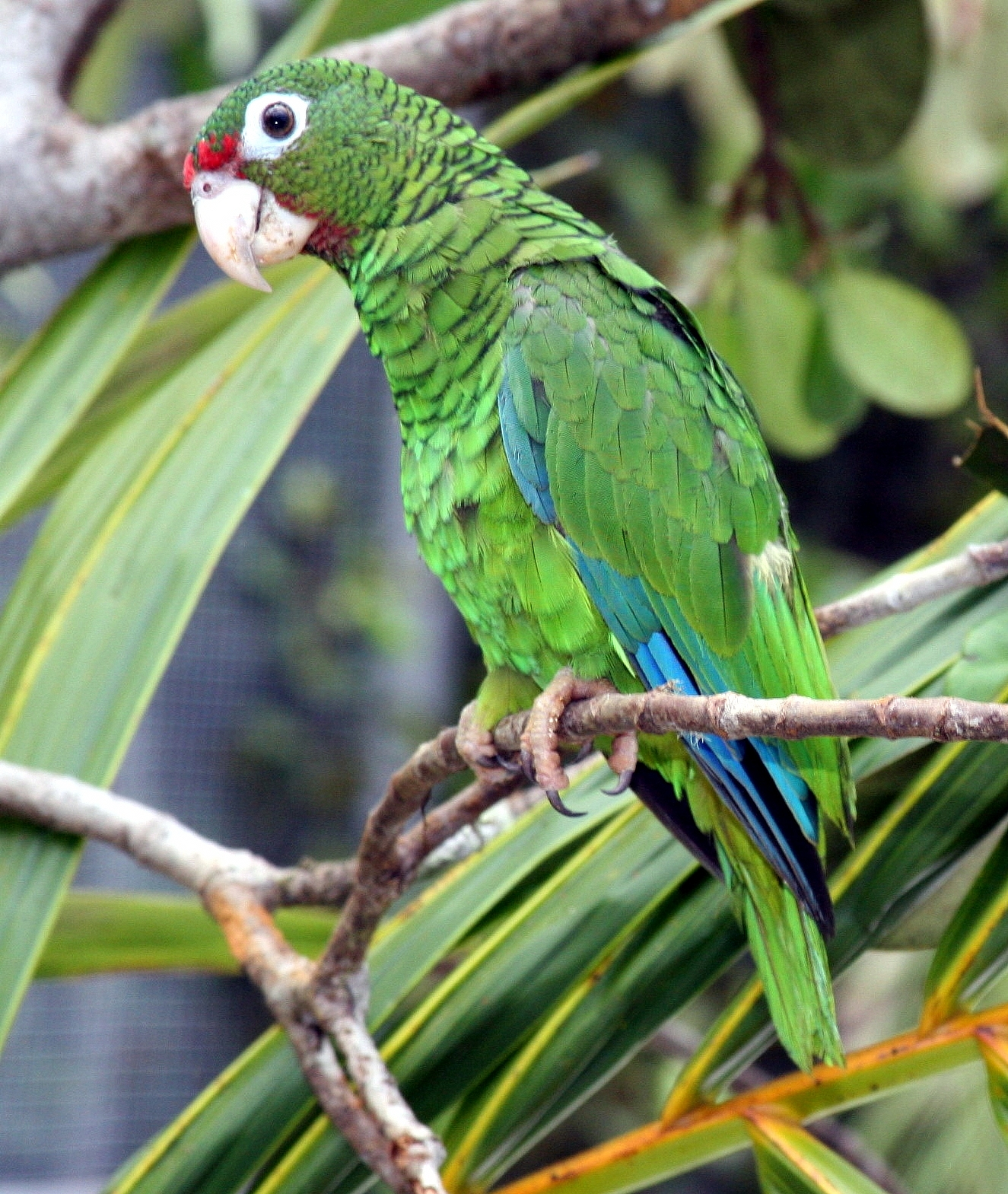
Cotorra puertorriqueña
(Amazona vittata)
Critically Endangered

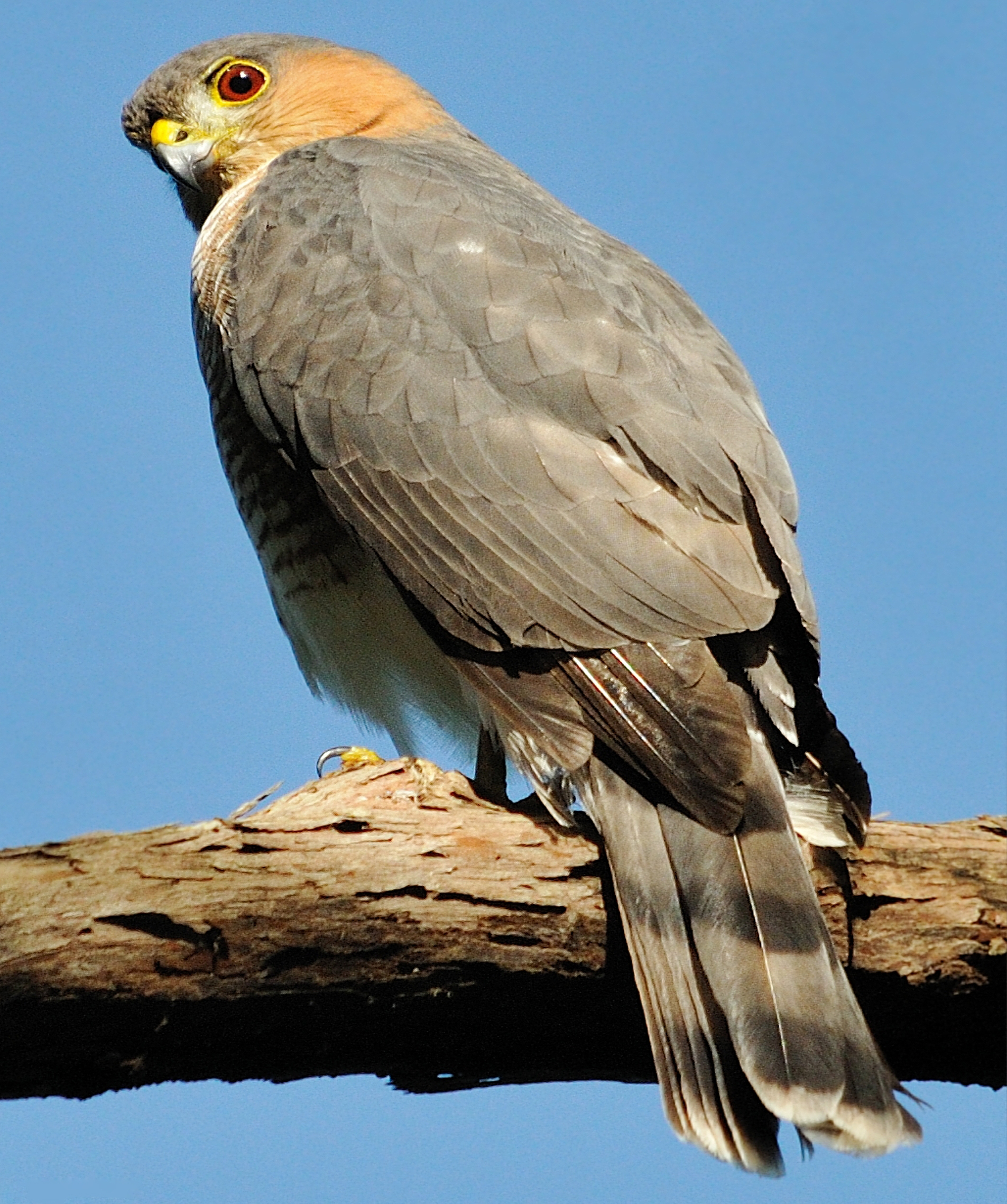
Falcón de sierra
(Accipiter striatus venator)
Endangered

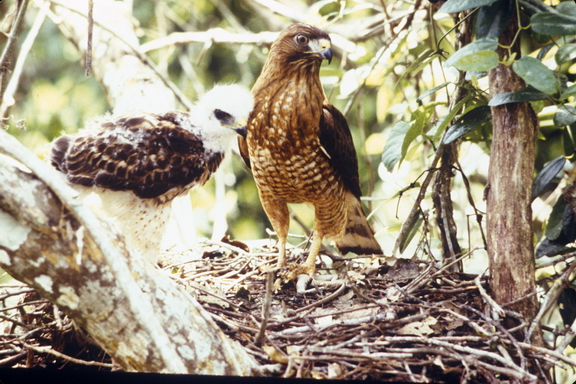
Guaragüao de bosque (Buteo platypterus brunnescens)
Endangered

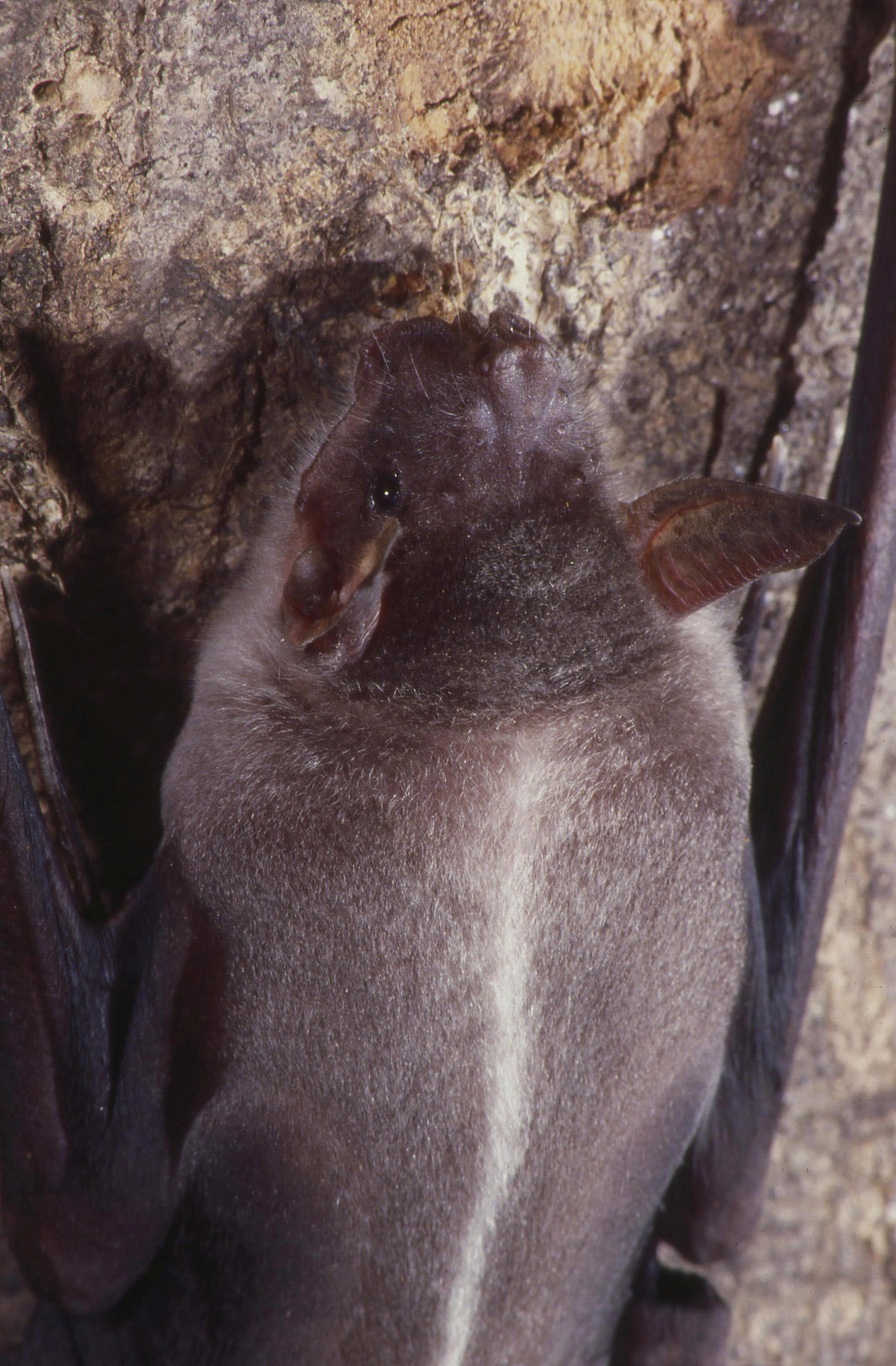
Murciélago pescador
(Noctilio leporinus)

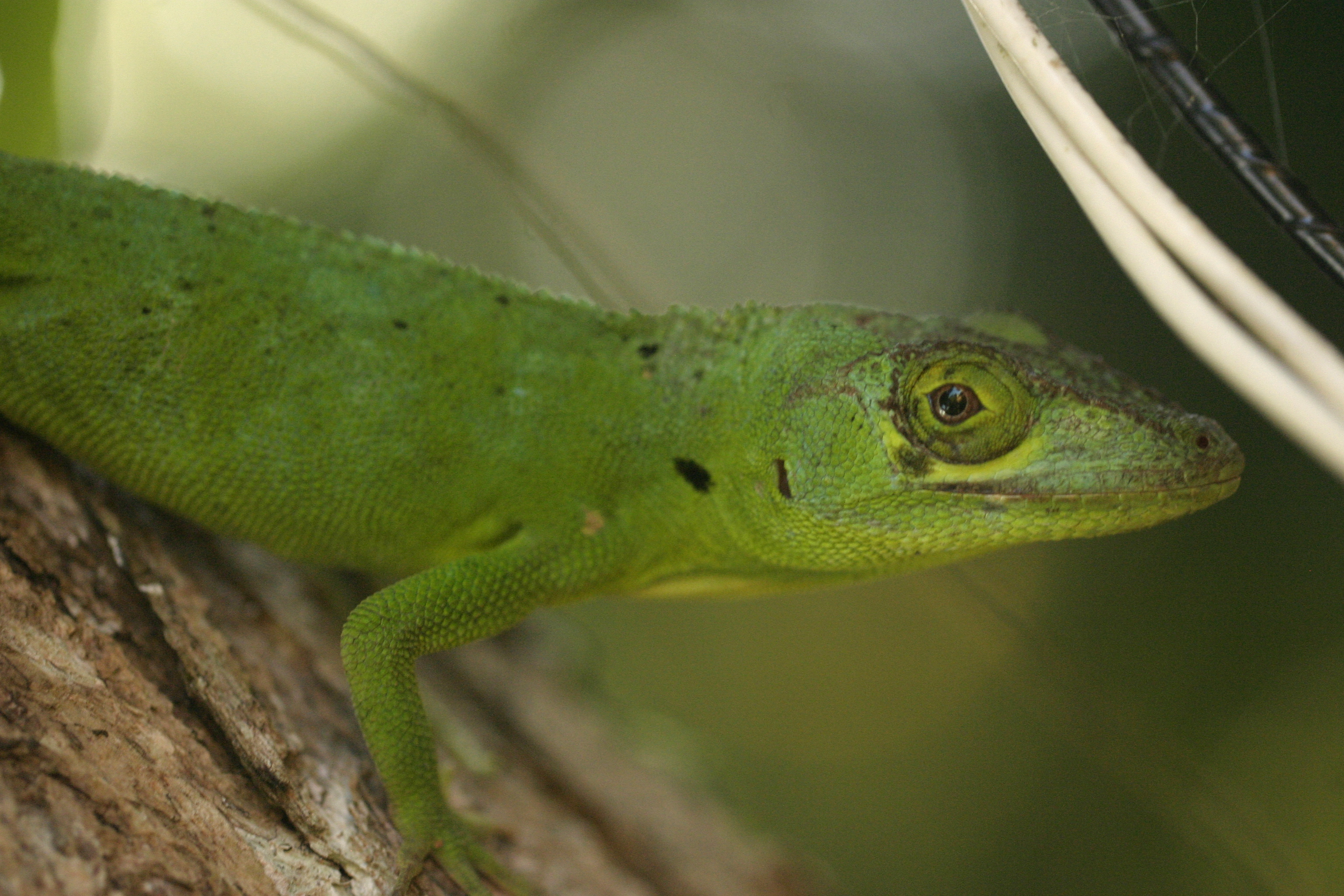
Lagarto verde
(Anolis cuvieri)

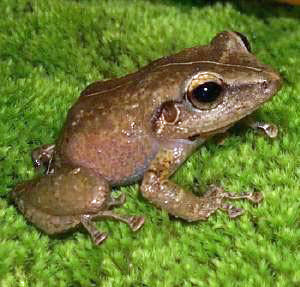
Coquí común
(Eleutherodactylus coqui)

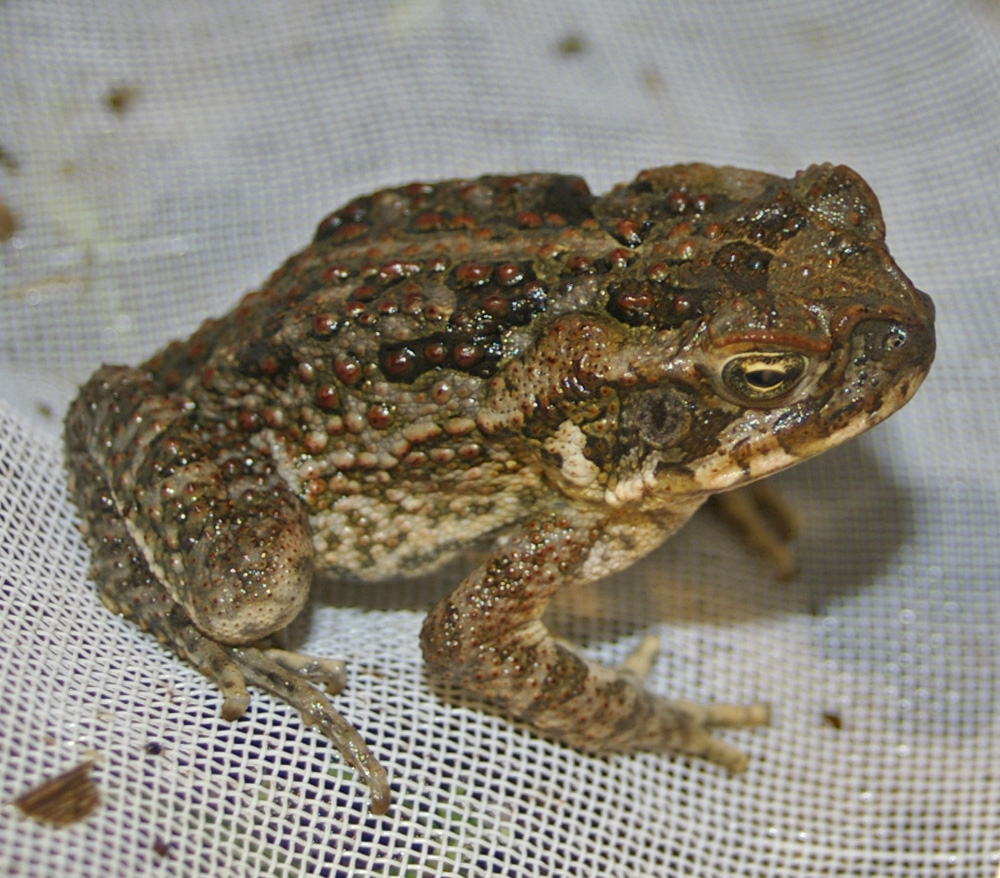
Sapo común
(Bufo marinus)

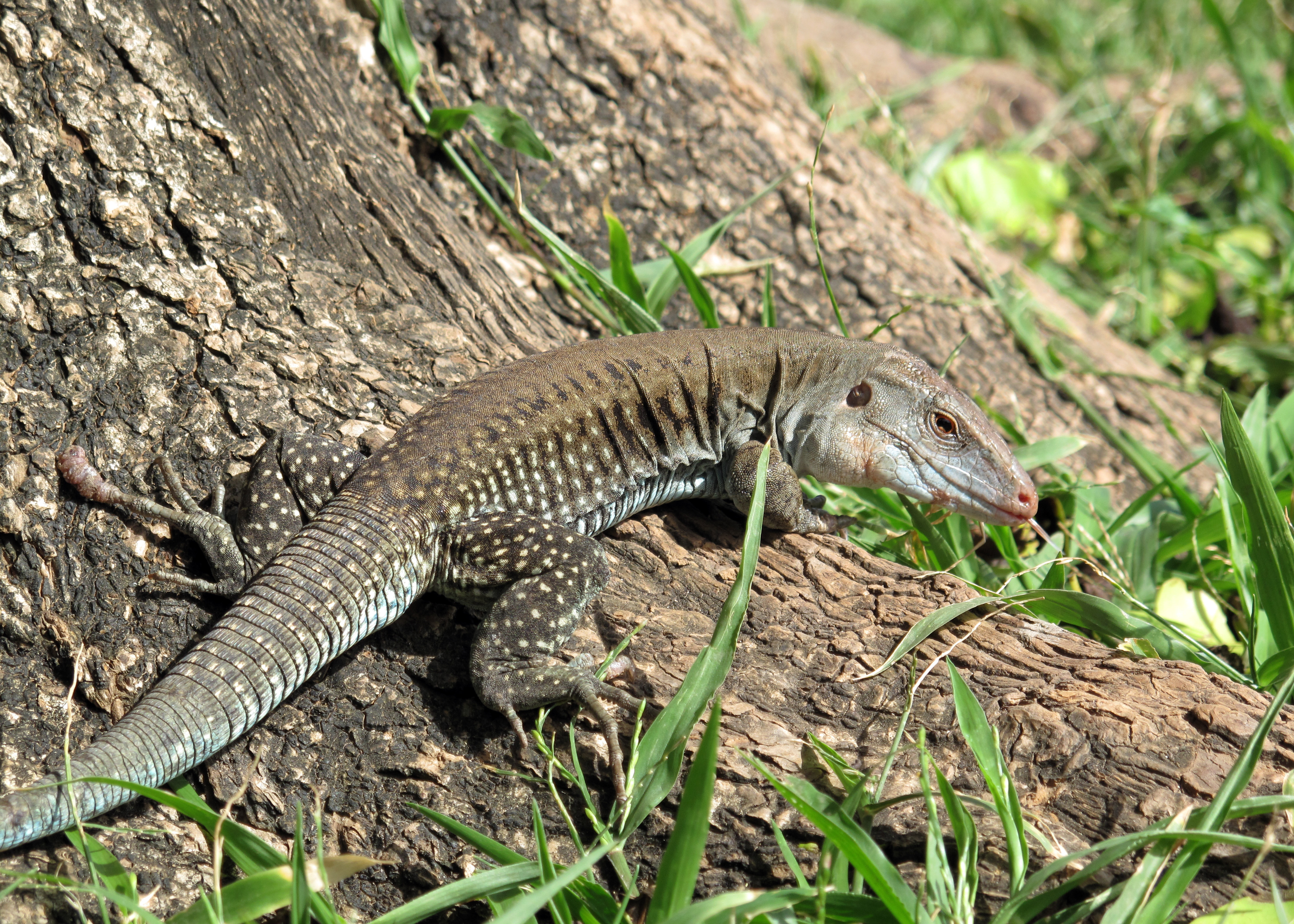
Siguana
(Ameiva exsul)

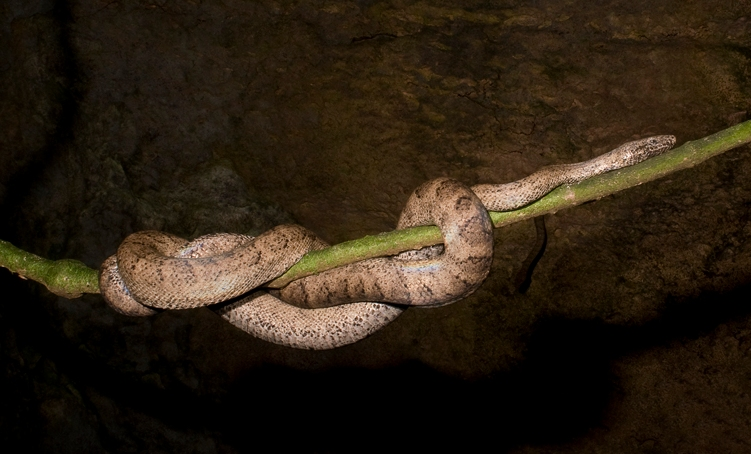
Boa de Puerto Rico (Chilabothrus inornatus)

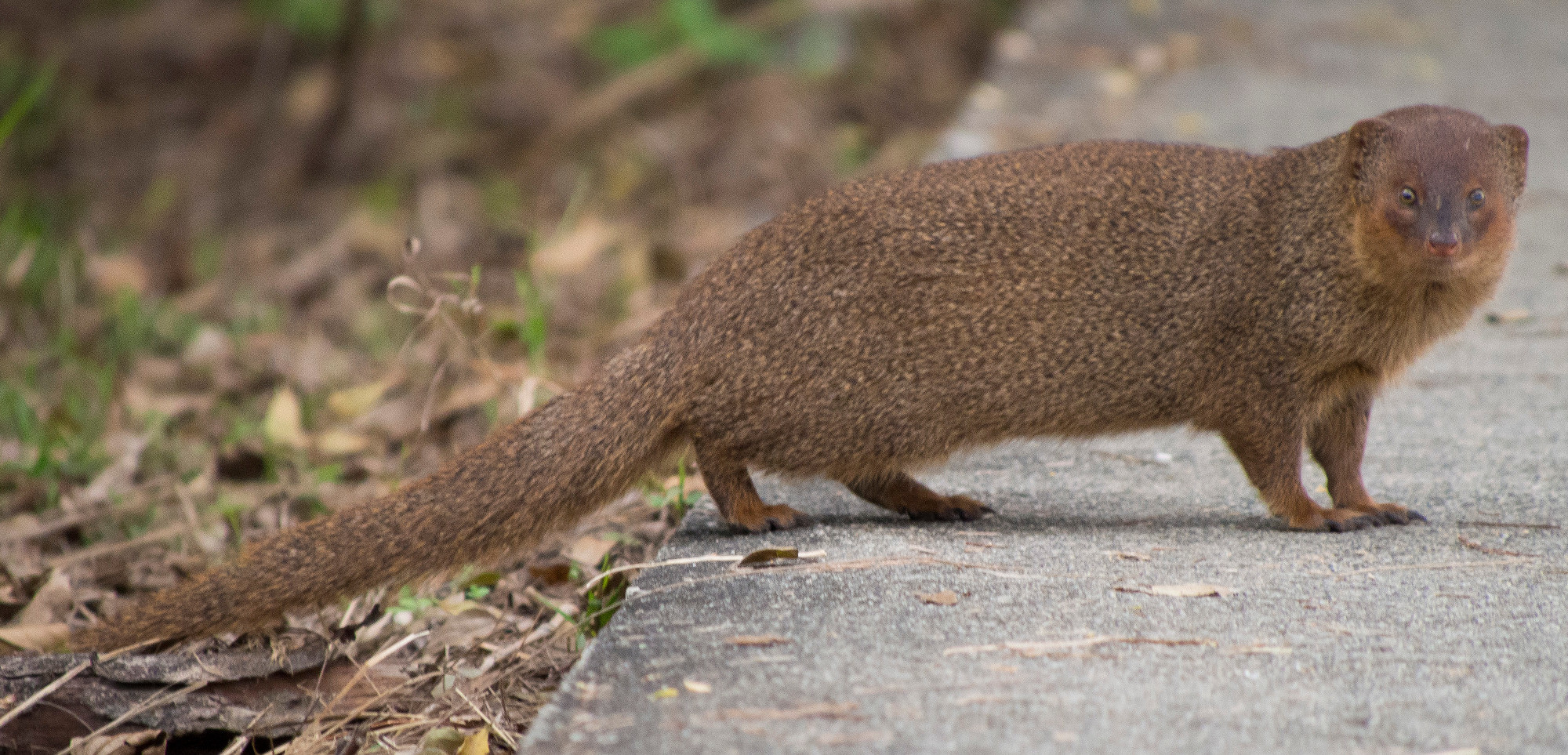
Mangosta pequeña asiática (Herpestes javanicus)

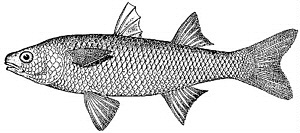
Dajao
(Agonostomus monticola)

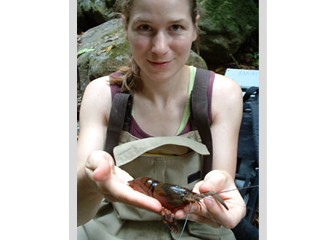
Macrobrachium
(Macrobrachium)

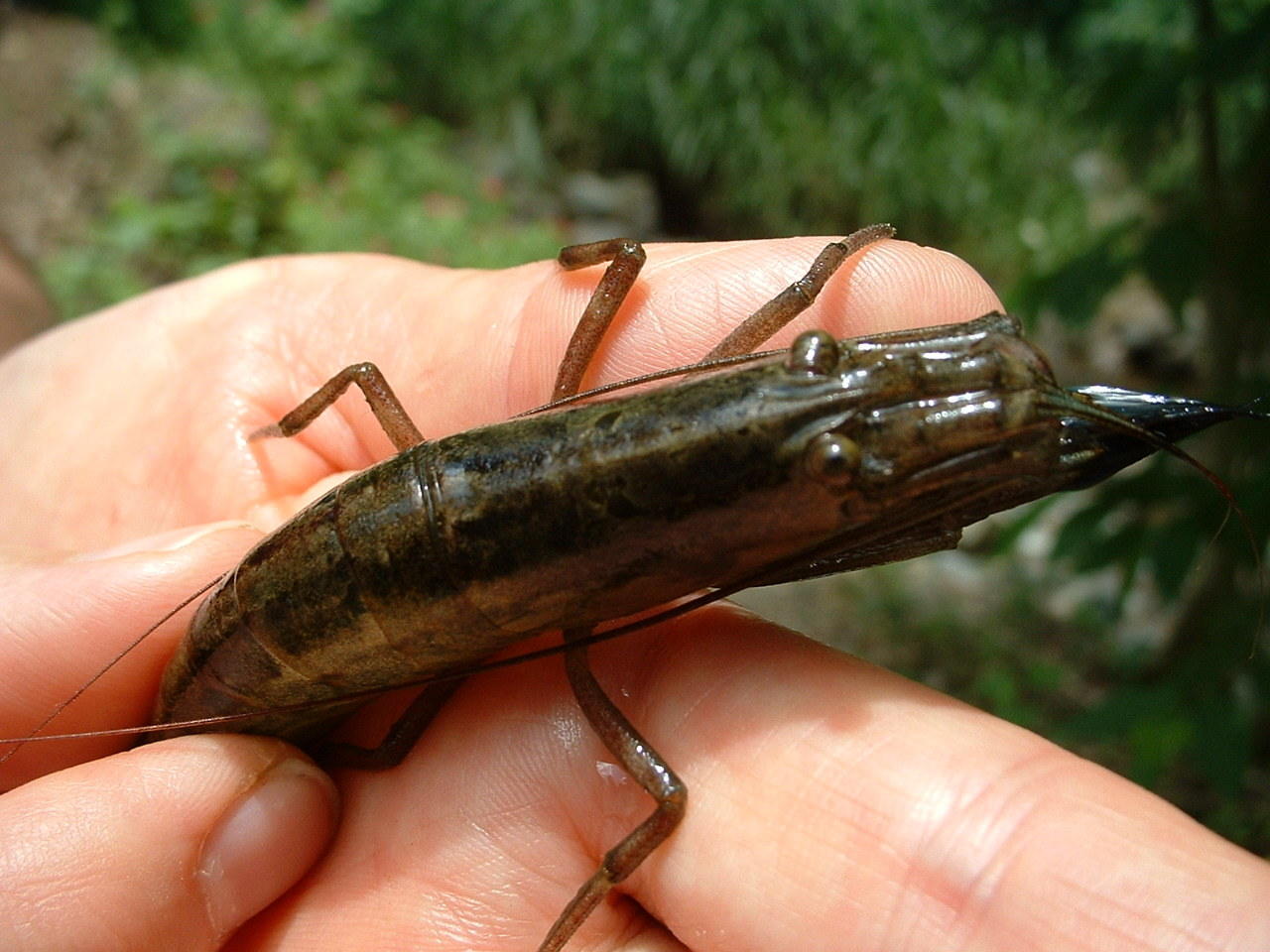
Gata
(Atya lanipes)

== See also ==
- List of fauna at Toro Negro State Forest
- List of flora at Toro Negro State Forest
- List of Puerto Rico state forests
- Puerto Rican tody
