= Puerto Rico Highway 144 =

Highway in Puerto Rico

Highway 144
- Ruta 144

Route information
- Maintained by Puerto Rico DTPW
- Length: 18.4 km (11.4 mi)
- Existed: 1953–present

Major junctions
- West end: PR-140 in Collores
- PR-528 in Collores; PR-531 in Jayuya Abajo; PR-5141 in Jayuya Abajo; PR-532 in Jayuya barrio-pueblo–Jayuya Abajo; PR-141 in Jayuya barrio-pueblo; PR-5144 in Veguitas–Coabey; PR-527 in Coabey–Veguitas; PR-539 in Coabey
- East end: PR-149 in Toro Negro

Location
- Country: United States
- Territory: Puerto Rico
- Municipalities: Jayuya, Ciales

Highway system
- Roads in Puerto Rico; List
← PR-143	→ PR-145
← PR-5141	PR-5144	→ PR-5155

Puerto Rico Highway 144 (PR-144) is a rural road that travels from Jayuya, Puerto Rico to Ciales. This road extends from PR-140 in Collores and ends at PR-149 in Toro Negro.

== Major intersections ==
Municipality	Location	km	mi	Destinations	Notes
Jayuya	Collores	0.0	0.0	PR-140 – Utuado, Ponce	Western terminus of PR-144
Jayuya	Collores	0.9– 1.0	0.56– 0.62	PR-528 – Zamas	
Jayuya	Jayuya Abajo	2.0	1.2	PR-531 – Caonillas Arriba	
Jayuya	Jayuya Abajo	4.1– 4.2	2.5– 2.6	PR-5141 (Desvío Norte de Jayuya) – Ciales	
Jayuya	Jayuya barrio-pueblo–Jayuya Abajo line	4.7	2.9	PR-532 – Jayuya	
Jayuya	Jayuya barrio-pueblo	5.1	3.2	PR-141 north – Ciales, Florida	One-way street; northbound access via Calle Libertad
Jayuya	Veguitas–Coabey line	6.1	3.8	PR-5144 – Ciales, Florida	
Jayuya	Veguitas–Coabey line	6.4– 6.5	4.0– 4.0	PR-527 – Veguitas	
Jayuya	Coabey	10.5	6.5	PR-539 – Saliente	
Ciales	Toro Negro	18.4	11.4	PR-149 (Carretera José Joaquín Rodríguez Rodríguez) – Ciales, Villalba	Eastern terminus of PR-144
1.000 mi = 1.609 km; 1.000 km = 0.621 mi: Incomplete access

== Related route ==
Highway 5144
- Location: Jayuya
- Length: 0.75 km (0.47 mi; 2,500 ft)

Puerto Rico Highway 5144 (PR-5144) is a bypass road that branches off from PR-144 and ends at PR-141 east of downtown Jayuya. The entire route is located in Jayuya.

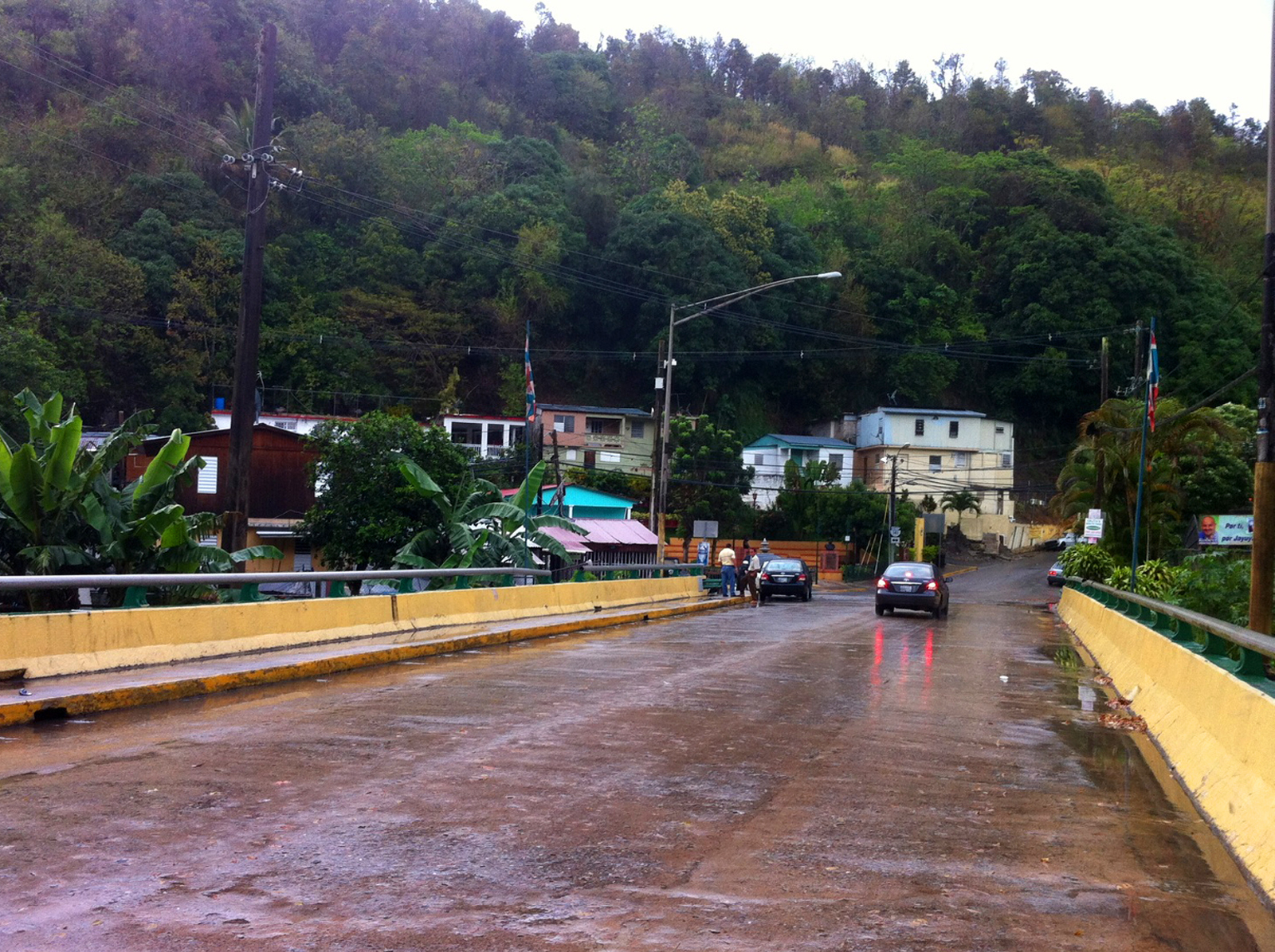
PR-5144 north near PR-141 junction in downtown Jayuya

Location	km	mi	Destinations	Notes
Veguitas–Coabey line	0.00	0.00	PR-144 – Jayuya, Villalba	Southern terminus of PR-5144
Jayuya barrio-pueblo	0.75	0.47	PR-141 – Jayuya, Ciales	Northern terminus of PR-5144
1.000 mi = 1.609 km; 1.000 km = 0.621 mi

== See also ==
- 1953 Puerto Rico highway renumbering
