= Puerto Rico Highway 140 =

Highway in Puerto Rico

Highway 140
- Ruta 140

Route information
- Maintained by Puerto Rico DTPW
- Length: 69.9 km (43.4 mi)
- Existed: 1953–present

Major junctions
- South end: PR-143 in Anón–Pica–Consejo
- PR-144 in Collores; PR-111 in Las Palmas; PR-141 in Mameyes Abajo; PR-146 in Frontón; PR-642 in Florida Adentro; PR-6642 in Florida Adentro; PR-2 in Florida Afuera; PR-22 in Florida Afuera; PR-684 in Florida Afuera; PR-22 in Florida Afuera
- North end: PR-2 in Florida Afuera

Location
- Country: United States
- Territory: Puerto Rico
- Municipalities: Ponce, Jayuya, Utuado, Ciales, Florida, Barceloneta

Highway system
- Roads in Puerto Rico; List
← PR-139	→ PR-141

Puerto Rico Highway 140 (PR-140) is a road that travels from Jayuya, Puerto Rico to Barceloneta, passing through Utuado, Ciales and Florida. This highway begins at PR-143 in Pica barrio and ends at PR-2 in Florida Afuera barrio.

Puerto Rico Highway 140 by municipality

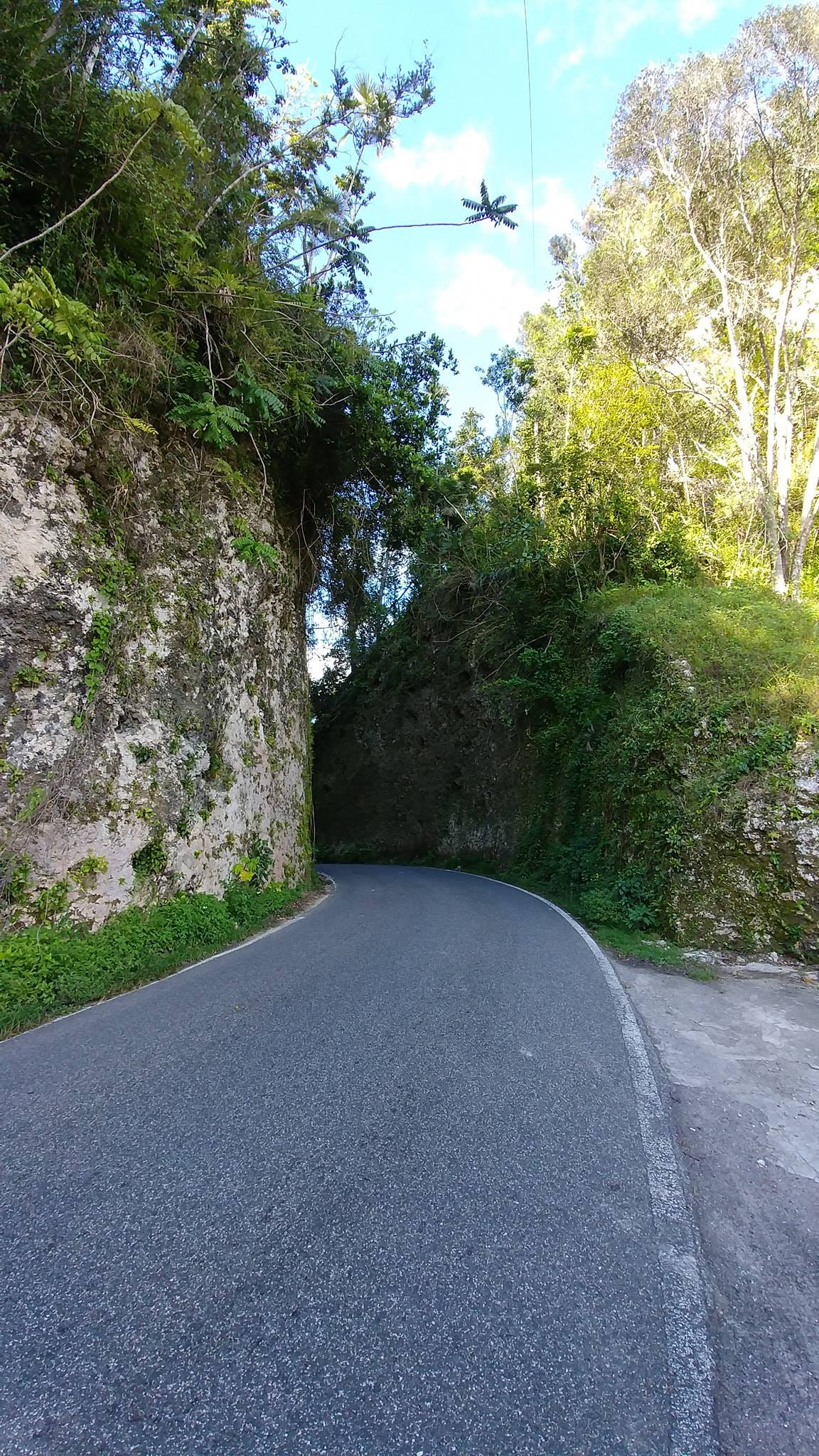
Heading north in Frontón, Ciales

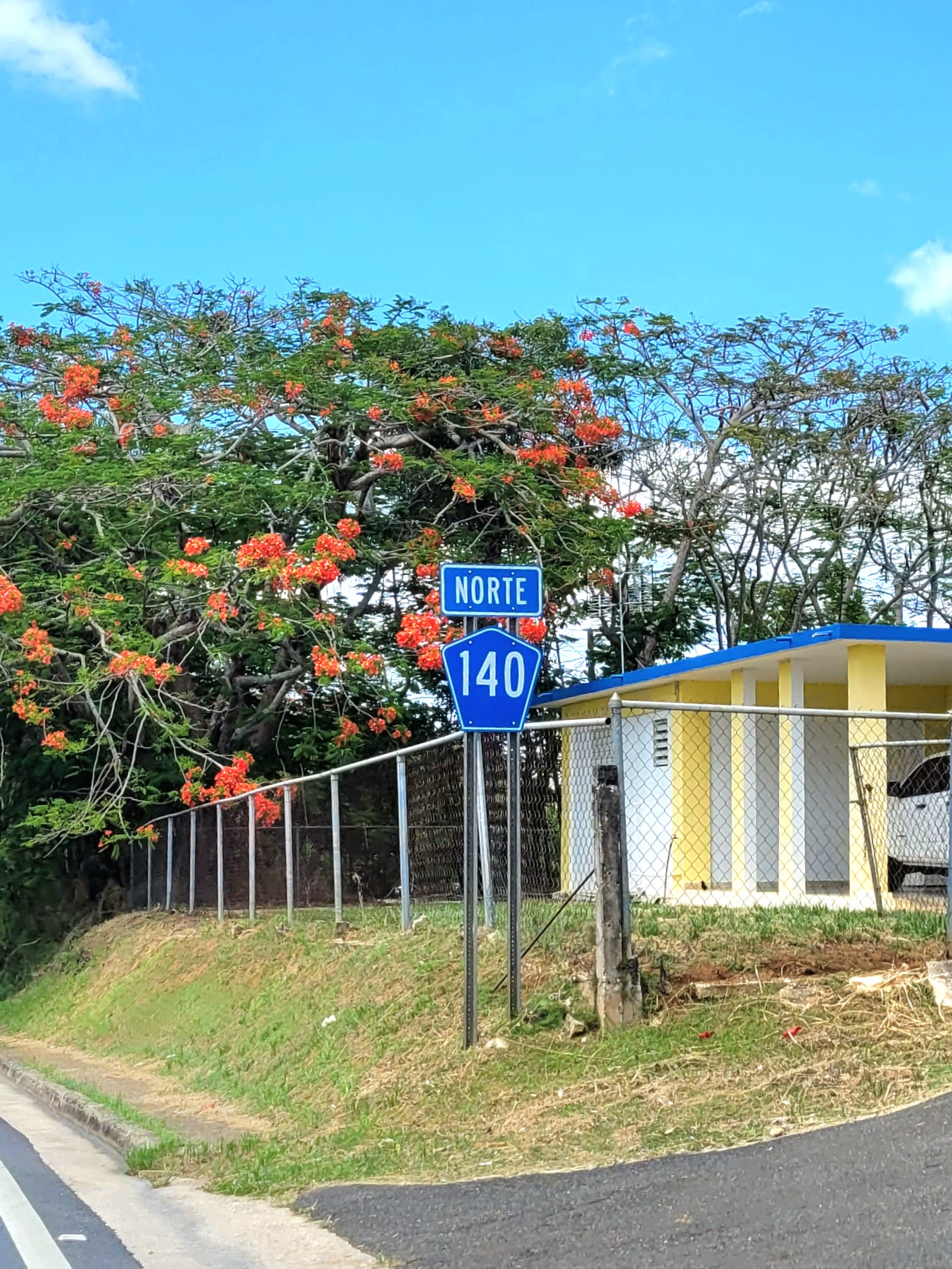
Northbound sign in Florida Afuera, Barceloneta

== Major intersections ==
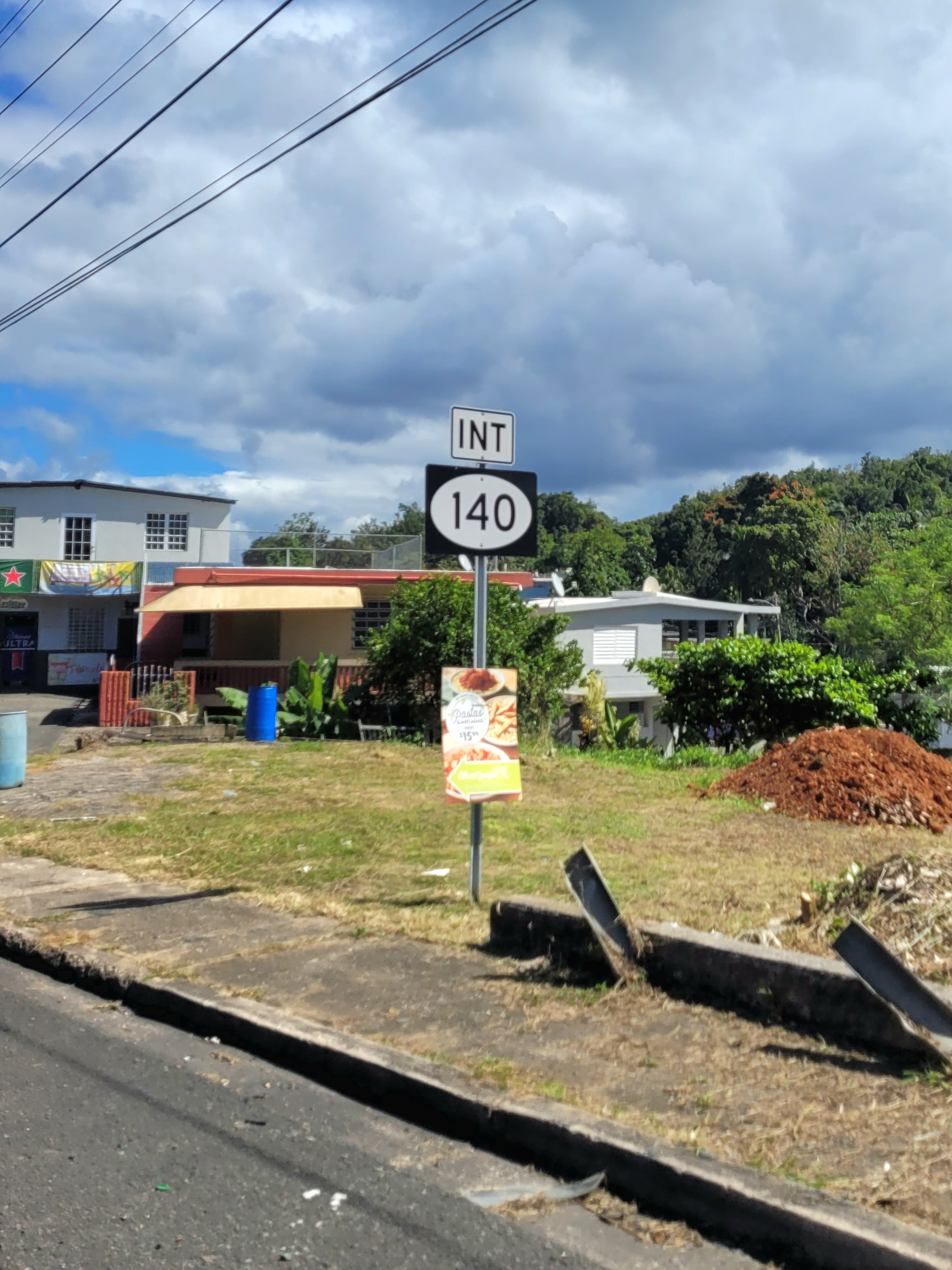
PR-2 east near the northern terminus of PR-140 in Barceloneta

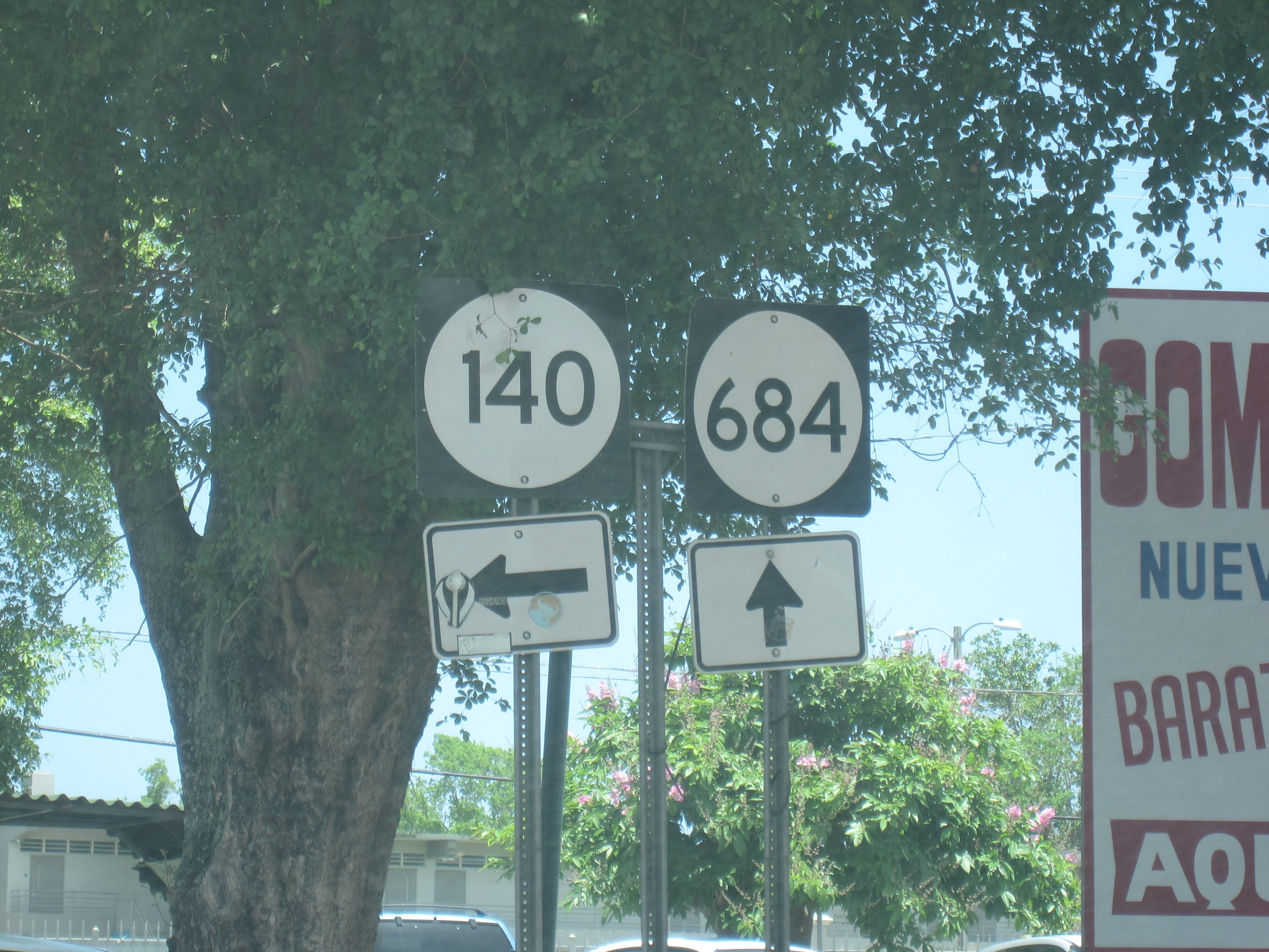
PR-140 at PR-684 intersection in downtown Barceloneta

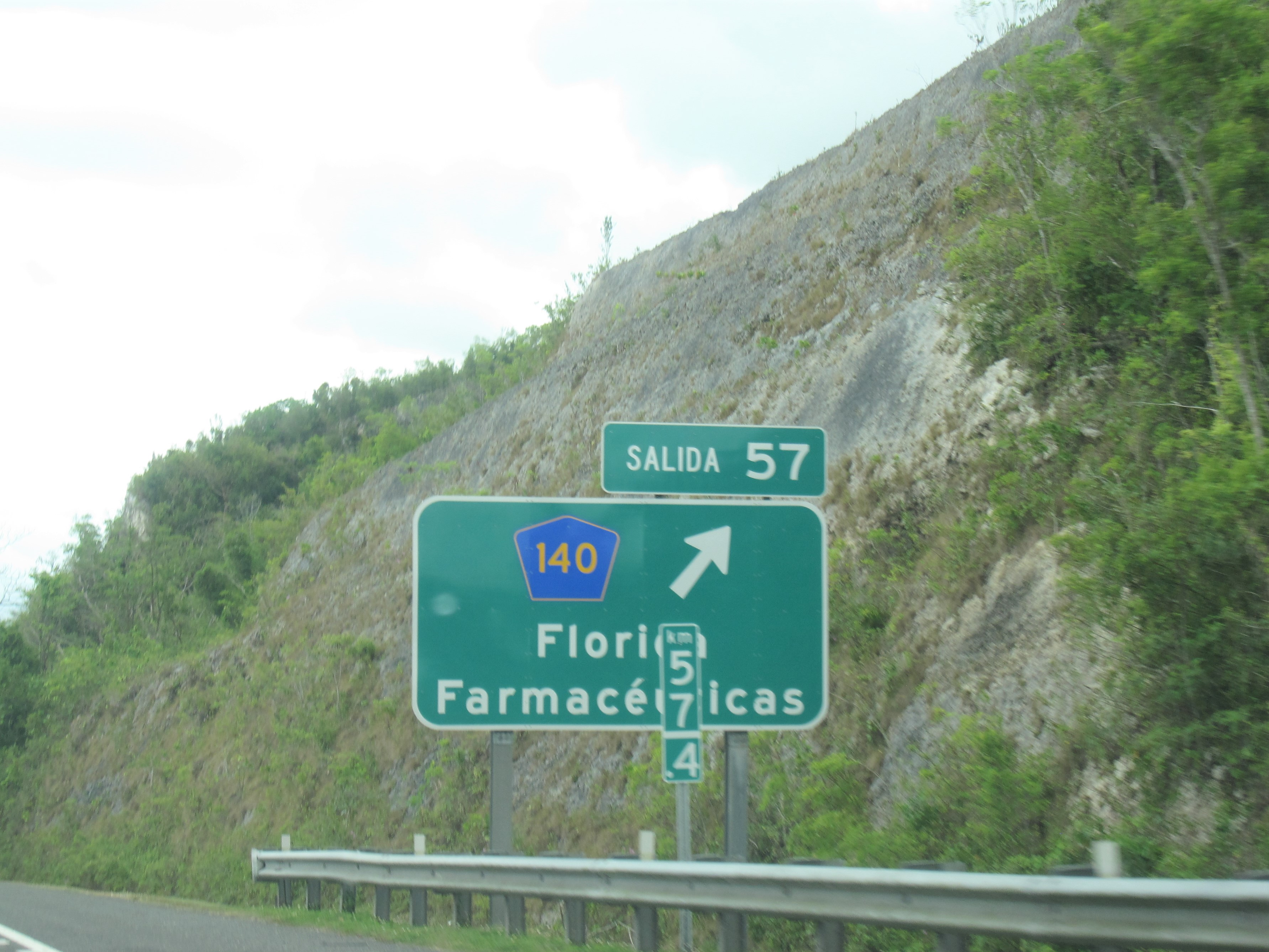
Sign for exit 57 to PR-140 on PR-22 east in Barceloneta

Municipality	Location	km	mi	Destinations	Notes
Ponce–Jayuya– Utuado municipal tripoint	Anón–Pica– Consejo tripoint	0.0	0.0	PR-143 (Ruta Panorámica) – Adjuntas, Barranquitas	Southern terminus of PR-140
Jayuya–Utuado municipal line	Pica–Consejo line	2.1	1.3	PR-605 – Viví Arriba	
Jayuya	Collores	8.1	5.0	PR-528 – Zamas	
Jayuya	Collores	9.0	5.6	PR-144 east – Jayuya	
Utuado	Paso Palma	15.0– 15.1	9.3– 9.4	PR-606 – Paso Palma	
Utuado	Las Palmas	21.4– 21.5	13.3– 13.4	PR-111 west – Utuado	
Utuado	Caonillas Abajo	25.1	15.6	PR-611 – Sabana Grande	
Utuado	Caonillas Abajo	28.0	17.4	PR-613 – Caonillas Arriba	
Utuado	Caonillas Abajo	29.1	18.1	PR-612 – Don Alonso	
Utuado	Mameyes Abajo	38.2	23.7	PR-141 south – Jayuya	
Ciales	Frontón	44.6 11.0 (Note: Kilometer markers represent the distance along PR-146 rather than PR-140.)	27.7 6.8	PR-146 west – Arecibo	Western terminus of PR-146 concurrency
Ciales	Frontón	11.3 44.7	7.0 27.8	PR-146 east – Ciales	Eastern terminus of PR-146 concurrency
Florida	Florida Adentro	52.1	32.4	PR-642 – Sabana Hoyos	
Florida	Florida Adentro	53.1	33.0	PR-629 – Fogones	
Florida	Florida Adentro	53.6	33.3	PR-631 – La Ceiba	
Florida	Florida Adentro	53.8	33.4	PR-642 – Manatí, Sabana Hoyos	Eastbound access via Calle Luis Muñoz Rivera; roundabout
Florida	Florida Adentro	55.2	34.3	PR-6642 east (Avenida Heriberto González Vélez) – Manatí	
Florida	Florida Adentro	56.1	34.9	PR-641 – Pajonal	
Barceloneta	Florida Afuera	61.8	38.4	PR-666 – Florida Afuera	
Barceloneta	Florida Afuera	62.4– 62.5	38.8– 38.8	PR-664 – Sabana Hoyos	
Barceloneta	Florida Afuera	63.8	39.6	PR-2 – Manatí, Arecibo	
Barceloneta	Florida Afuera	65.3	40.6	PR-22 (Autopista José de Diego) – San Juan, Arecibo	PR-22 exit 57; partial cloverleaf interchange
Barceloneta	Florida Afuera	67.6– 67.7	42.0– 42.1	PR-682 (Carretera Leovigildo Figueroa Serrano) – Garrochales	
Barceloneta	Florida Afuera	68.0	42.3	PR-684 – Barceloneta	
Barceloneta	Florida Afuera	69.2	43.0	PR-22 (Autopista José de Diego) – San Juan, Arecibo	PR-22 exit 55; partial cloverleaf interchange
Barceloneta	Florida Afuera	69.9	43.4	PR-2 – Manatí, Arecibo	Northern terminus of PR-140
1.000 mi = 1.609 km; 1.000 km = 0.621 mi: Concurrency terminus; Incomplete access

== See also ==
- 1953 Puerto Rico highway renumbering
