= Monte Jayuya =

Mountain in Puerto Rico

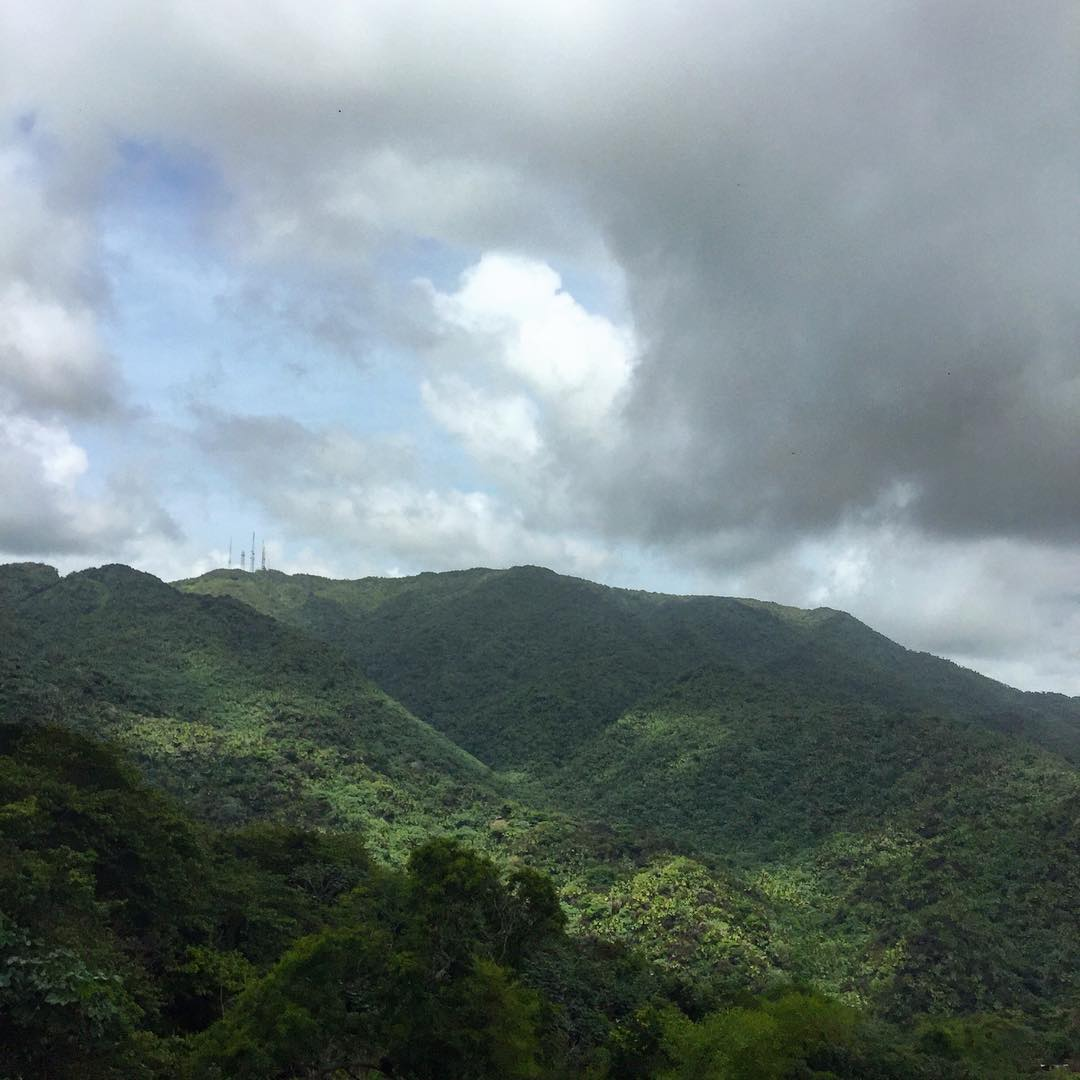
- Monte Jayuya from Coabey.

Highest point
- Elevation: 1,315 m (4,314 ft)
- Coordinates: 18°10′04″N 66°34′29″W

Geography
- Location within Puerto Rico
- Location: Jayuya / Ponce, Puerto Rico
- Parent range: Cordillera Central

Climbing
- Easiest route: Hike

Monte Jayuya is the second highest peak of Puerto Rico measuring 1,296 meters (4,252 ft) above sea level. The mountain is located in the Cordillera Central, on the border between the municipalities of Jayuya (Barrio Saliente) and Ponce (Barrio Anón). The peak is located in the municipality of Ponce and it is within the Toro Negro State Forest.
