= Zamas =

Zamas may refer to:

- Zamas, Jayuya, Puerto Rico, a barrio
- Zamas River, Puerto Rico
- Zamasu, a character in the Dragon Ball Super manga series
