= Nemesio Canales =

Puerto Rican writer and politician

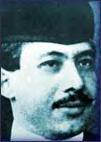
- Nemesio Canales
- Born: Nemesio Rosario Canales Rivera; December 18, 1878; Jayuya, Puerto Rico
- Died: September 14, 1923 (Aged 44); New York, New York
- Resting place: Santa María Magdalena de Pazzis Cemetery (1923–2011); Canales Family Residence Museum (2011)
- Occupations: Journalist, novelist, playwright
- Spouse: Guarina Díaz Baldorioty
- Relatives: Blanca Canales Torresola (sister)

Nemesio Canales (December 18, 1878 – September 14, 1923) was a Puerto Rican essayist, journalist, novelist, playwright, politician, and activist who defended women's civil rights. As a politician, he presented a bill to the Puerto Rico House of Representatives, which was defeated 23 votes to 7, giving women their full civil rights, including the right to vote.

== Early years ==
Canales (birth name: Nemesio Rosario Canales Rivera) was born on December 18, 1878, in Jayuya. He was the firstborn of Rosario Canales Quintero and Francisca Rivera Rivera. He received his primary and secondary education in schools in Utuado and Jayuya. One of these schools was Colegio Roselló, established in Utuado by Juan Luis Roselló in 1867. Canales continued his higher educational studies in the Liceo of Mayagüez where he earned a bachelor's degree (now equivalent to High School). In 1896, Canales went to Spain and enrolled in the University of Zaragoza to study medicine and law. In 1898, when the United States declared war against Spain, Canales abandoned his studies and went to Baltimore, where he enrolled in Baltimore's College of Law in 1903.

== Political activist ==
Upon his return to Puerto Rico he went to live in the city of Ponce, where he co-founded the daily newspaper paper El Día. and married Guarina Díaz Baldorioty, the granddaughter of Román Baldorioty de Castro. In Ponce, Canales joined the law firm of Luis Lloréns Torres. Like so many lawyers of the time, he wrote poetry of patriotic themes, collaborated as a journalist and took an active interest in politics. He served in the House of Representatives of Puerto Rico as a member of the Unionist Party, which promoted economic progress of the working class. In 1909, Canales presented a bill to the House giving women their full civil rights, including the right to vote, which was defeated 23 votes to 7. He also served as a lecturer in the School of Law of the University of Puerto Rico.

== Writer ==
Canales co-founded with Luis Lloréns Torres, the Revista de las Antillas. He also wrote short novels and a comedy called El Heroe Galopante (The Run Away Hero), which debuted on stage in 1923 after his death. In 1914, he bought Ponce's El Día newspaper (which later became El Nuevo Día). In his newspaper he had a column in which he wrote his Paliques, in which he showed his understanding of human nature with humor and insight. In his works, he makes an emphasis of the pride that he feels for all things Puerto Rican. A collection of his Paliques was published in 1913. Some of his other works include the novels Hacía Un Lejano Sol, Mi Volutad Se Ha Muerto and La Leyenda Benaventina. Canales presented many lectures, including some in Argentina, Peru, Uruguay, Panama, and Venezuela.

== Death ==
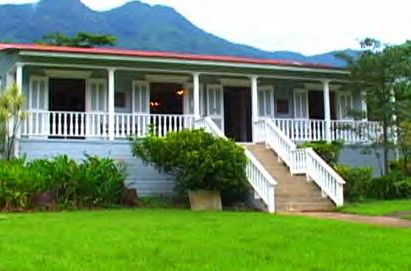
The Canales Family Residence Museum in Jayuya

On September 14, 1923, Nemesio Canales was on board the steamer San Lorenzo bound for New York City with the intention of going to Washington, D.C., as a legal assistant to a legislative Puerto Rican commission when he died. He was buried at the Santa María Magdalena de Pazzis Cemetery.

=== Reburial ===
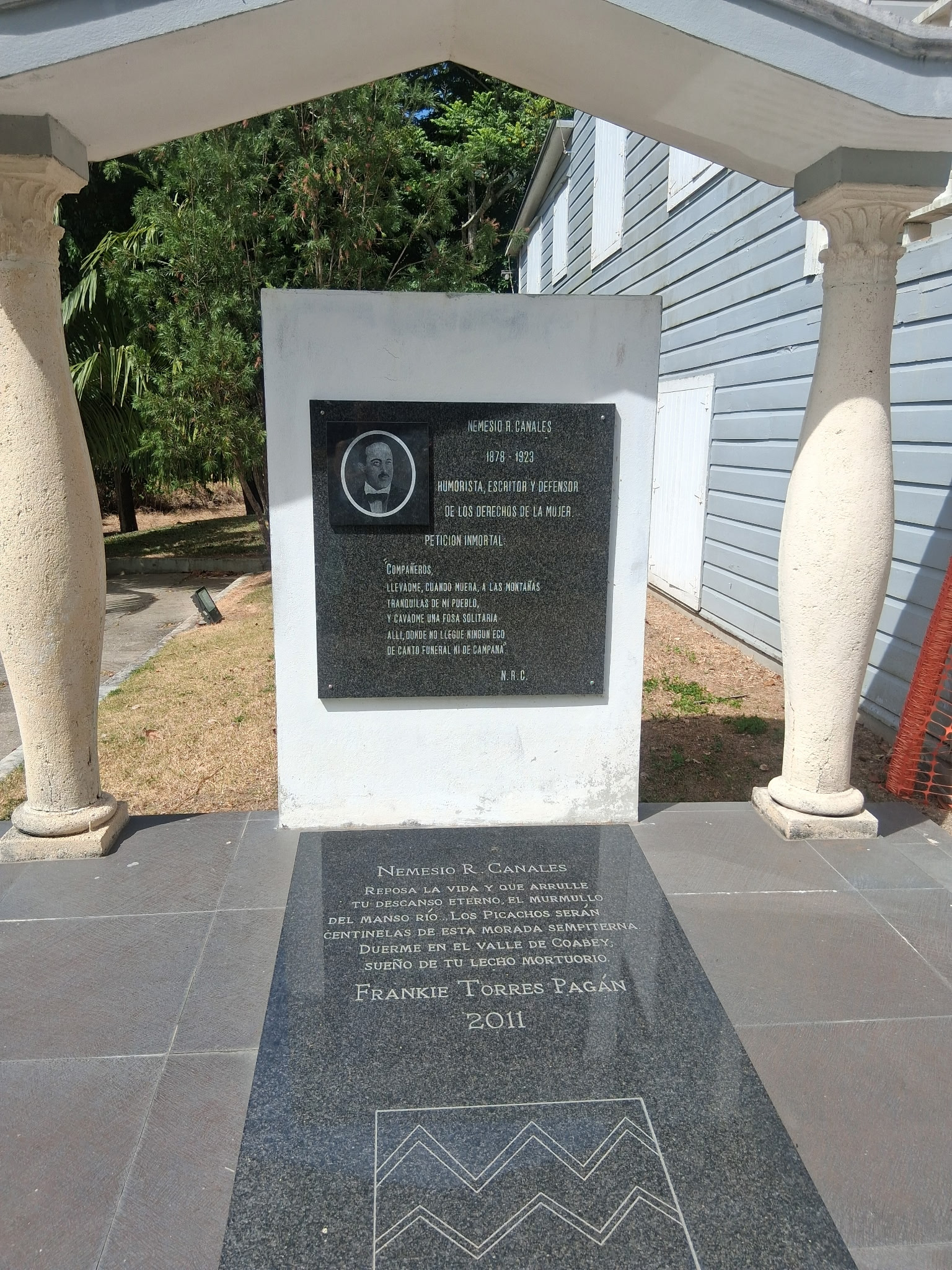
Nemesio Canales tomb in Jayuya

In August 2011, Jayuya mayor Georgie González petitioned San Juan mayor Jorge Santini to exhume Canales' body to be interred in Jayuya, to which the latter accepted. Canales' body was exhumed from the Santa María Magdalena de Pazzis Cemetery in the Old San Juan and taken to the Canales Family Residence Museum, where he was interred beside the house the same day. A message written by Nemesio Canales during his lifetime is inscribed on his new tomb, which reads:

Companions: take me, when I die, to the quiet mountains of my town and delve me a solitary pit there, where no echo of a funeral chant or of bell will reach.

== Legacy ==
Puerto Rico awards the Nemesio Canales Award in Literature every year to outstanding young writers, and has named a public housing project in San Juan named after him. His native town, Jayuya, erected a statue in his honor, sculpted by well-known Puerto Rican sculptor Tomás Batista, and named the town square after him. Jayuya also converted the house in which Nemesio and his sister were raised into a museum. In Ponce, he is honored at the Illustrious Ponce Citizens Plaza in the Tricentennial Park.

== Notable family members ==
His younger sister, Blanca Canales Torresola, was a leader of the Puerto Rican Nationalist Party which was presided by Pedro Albizu Campos. In October 30, 1950, she led the Jayuya Uprising revolt against United States colonial rule. Her cousins were Elio Torresola, Griselio Torresola one of two Puerto Rican nationalists who attempted to assassinate United States President Harry Truman and Doris Torresola, all high-ranking members of the party involved in the Puerto Rican Nationalist Party Revolts of the 1950s.

== See also ==
- List of Puerto Ricans
- List of Puerto Rican writers
- Puerto Rican literature
