= Pica, Jayuya, Puerto Rico =

Barrio of Puerto Rico

Pica
- Barrio
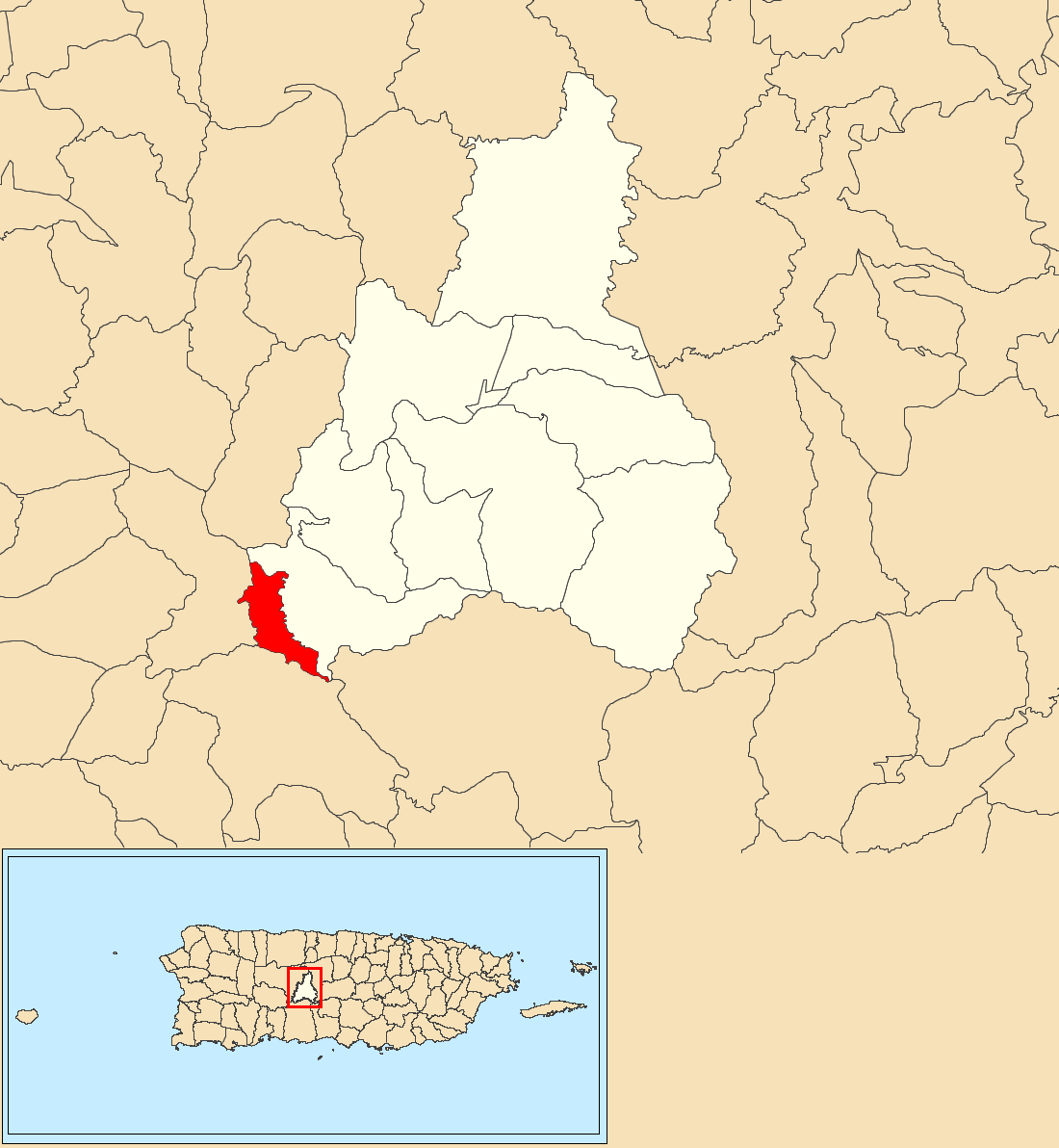
- Location of Pica within the municipality of Jayuya shown in red

- Location of Puerto Rico
- Coordinates: 18°09′52″N 66°38′42″W
- Commonwealth: Puerto Rico
- Municipality: Jayuya

Area
  - Total: 0.94 sq mi (2.4 km^{2})
  - Land: 0.94 sq mi (2.4 km^{2})
  - Water: 0.00 sq mi (0 km^{2})
- Elevation: 2,418 ft (737 m)

Population (2010)
  - Total: 153
  - Density: 168.8/sq mi (65.2/km^{2})
- Source: 2010 Census
- Time zone: UTC−4 (AST)
- ZIP Code: 00664
- Area code: 787/939

Pica (Barrio Pica) is a barrio in the municipality of Jayuya, Puerto Rico. Its population in 2010 was 153. In 1948, Pica was established from part of what was Jayuya Arriba (Jayuya barrio-pueblo).

Historical population
Census	Pop.	Note	%±
1950	179		—
1960	224		25.1%
1970	145		−35.3%
1980	142		−2.1%
1990	303		113.4%
2000	356		17.5%
2010	153		−57.0%
U.S. Decennial Census; 1950 1980-2000 2010

== See also ==
- List of communities in Puerto Rico
