= Jayuya Abajo =

Barrio of Jayuya, Puerto Rico

- Barrio
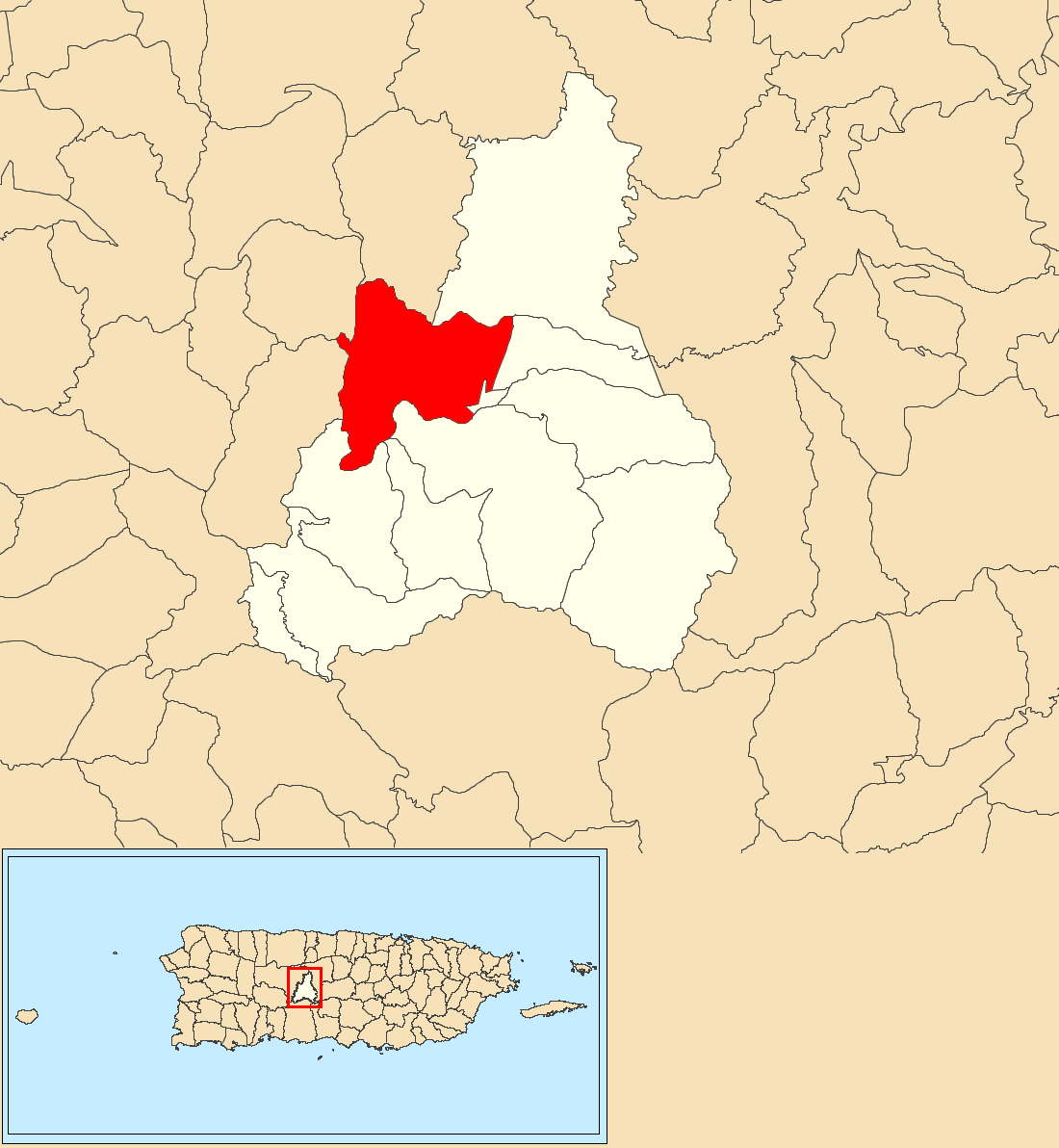
- Location of Jayuya Abajo within the municipality of Jayuya shown in red

- Location of Puerto Rico
- Coordinates: 18°14′02″N 66°36′49″W
- Commonwealth: Puerto Rico
- Municipality: Jayuya

Area
  - Total: 4.97 sq mi (12.9 km^{2})
  - Land: 4.97 sq mi (12.9 km^{2})
  - Water: 0.00 sq mi (0 km^{2})
- Elevation: 1,627 ft (496 m)

Population (2010)
  - Total: 3,367
  - Density: 677.5/sq mi (261.6/km^{2})
- Source: 2010 Census
- Time zone: UTC−4 (AST)
- ZIP Code: 00664
- Area code: 787/939

Jayuya Abajo is a barrio in the municipality of Jayuya, Puerto Rico. Its population in 2010 was 3,367.

== History ==
Jayuya Abajo was in Spain's gazetteers until Puerto Rico was ceded by Spain in the aftermath of the Spanish–American War under the terms of the Treaty of Paris of 1898 and became an unincorporated territory of the United States. In 1899, the United States Department of War conducted a census of Puerto Rico finding that the population of Jayuya Abajo barrio (then part of Utuado) was 3,597.

Historical population
Census	Pop.	Note	%±
1900	3,597		—
1910	3,082		−14.3%
1920	3,779		22.6%
1930	2,827		−25.2%
1940	3,150		11.4%
1950	827		−73.7%
1960	1,803		118.0%
1970	0		−100.0%
1980	2,327		—
1990	2,642		13.5%
2000	3,071		16.2%
2010	3,367		9.6%
U.S. Decennial Census; 1899 (shown as 1900) 1910-1930; 1930-1950 1980-2000 2010

== See also ==
- List of communities in Puerto Rico
