= Collores, Jayuya, Puerto Rico =

Barrio of Puerto Rico

Collores
- Barrio
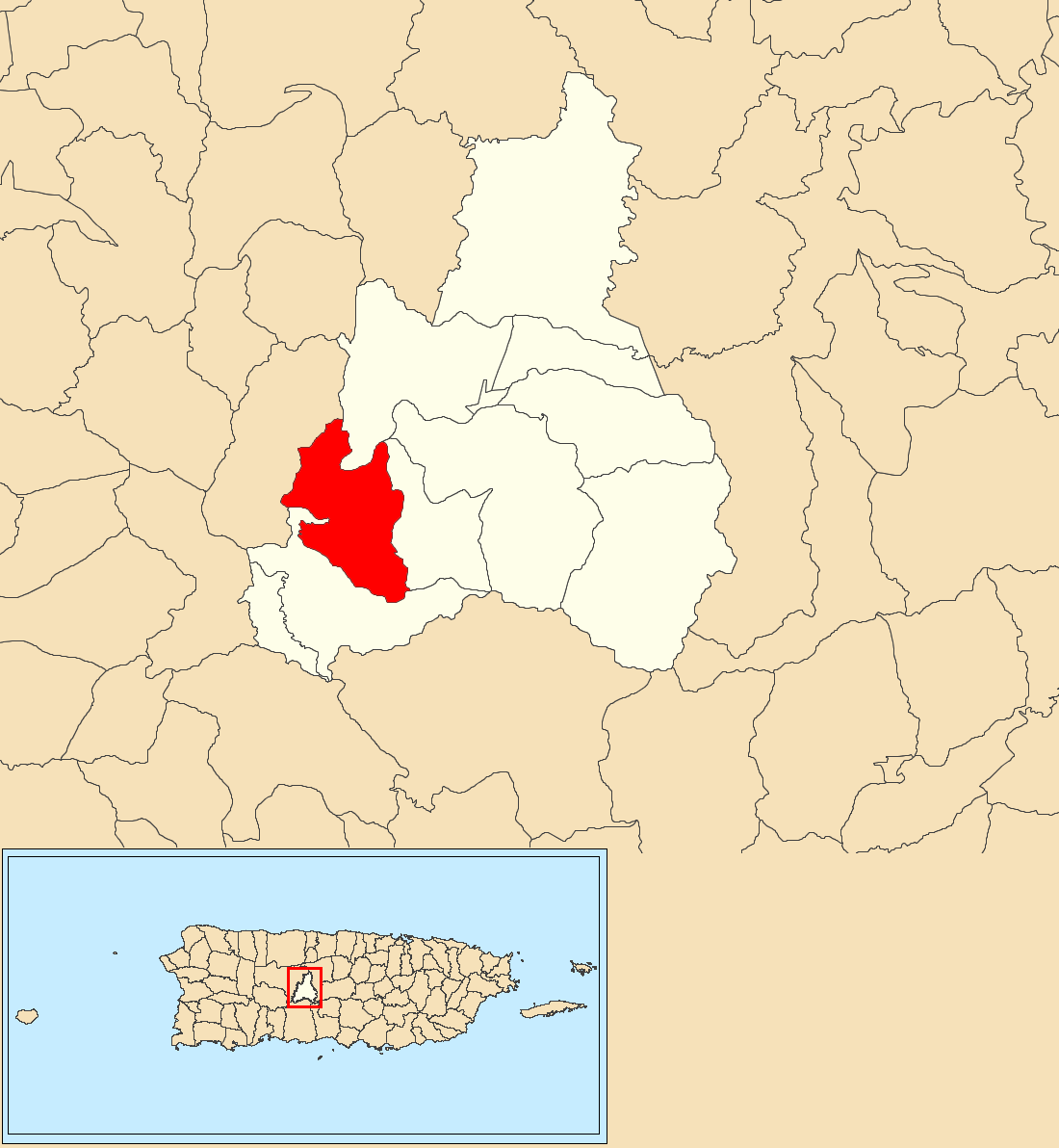
- Location of Collores within the municipality of Jayuya shown in red

- Location of Puerto Rico
- Coordinates: 18°11′29″N 66°37′35″W
- Commonwealth: Puerto Rico
- Municipality: Jayuya

Area
  - Total: 3.49 sq mi (9.0 km^{2})
  - Land: 3.49 sq mi (9.0 km^{2})
  - Water: 0.00 sq mi (0 km^{2})
- Elevation: 1,499 ft (457 m)

Population (2010)
  - Total: 1,666
  - Density: 477.4/sq mi (184.3/km^{2})
- Source: 2010 Census
- Time zone: UTC−4 (AST)
- ZIP Code: 00664
- Area code: 787/939

Collores is a barrio in the municipality of Jayuya, Puerto Rico. Its population in 2010 was 1,666. In 1948, Collores was established from part of what was Jayuya Arriba (Jayuya barrio-pueblo).

Historical population
Census	Pop.	Note	%±
1950	1,823		—
1960	1,410		−22.7%
1970	1,326		−6.0%
1980	1,435		8.2%
1990	1,470		2.4%
2000	1,496		1.8%
2010	1,666		11.4%
U.S. Decennial Census; 1950 1980-2000 2010

== See also ==
- List of communities in Puerto Rico
