= Los Tres Picachos =

Mountain in Puerto Rico

Tres Picachos
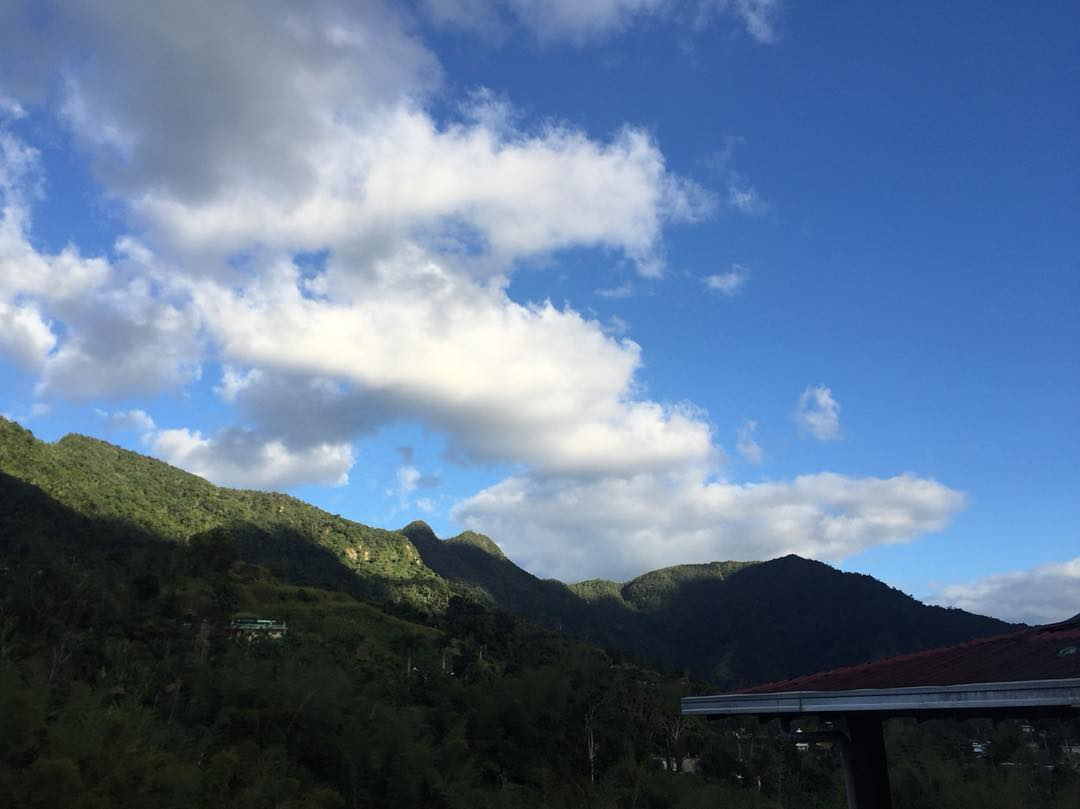
- Tres Picachos from the southwest.

Highest point
- Elevation: 968 m (3,176 ft)
- Coordinates: 18°12′53″N 66°32′29″W

Naming
- English translation: Three Peaks
- Language of name: Spanish

Geography
- Location within Puerto Rico
- Location: Ciales / Jayuya, Puerto Rico
- Parent range: Cordillera Central

Climbing
- Easiest route: Hike

Tres Picachos (Spanish for Three Little Peaks) is one of the highest peaks in Puerto Rico at 968 meters (3,176 ft). It is located on the border between the municipalities of Ciales and Jayuya in the central part of the island, and is part of the Cordillera Central.

The mountain has three joint peaks from which the name is derived. It is believed that Taíno Indians thought the mountain to be sacred.
