= Jorge González Otero =

Puerto Rican politician

Mayor of Jayuya
- Assuming office January 14, 1997
- Succeeding: José A. Rivera Rodríguez

Personal details
- Born: May 16, 1957 (age 69) Jayuya, Puerto Rico
- Party: Popular Democratic Party (PPD)
- Spouse: Hilda M. Huertas (1977-present)
- Children: Jorge O. Marially; Jorge L.
- Education: University of Puerto Rico at Mayagüez (BArch)

Jorge L. "Georgie" González Otero (born May 16, 1957) is a Puerto Rican politician and the current mayor of Jayuya. González is affiliated with the Popular Democratic Party (PPD) and has served as mayor since 1997.

== Early years and studies ==
Jorge González Otero was born in Jayuya on May 16, 1957. He is the eight of nine children born to farmer Ramón González and Antonia Otero.

González completed his elementary and high school studies in his hometown. In 1975, he is admitted to the University of Puerto Rico at Mayagüez. In 1980, he graduated with a Bachelor's degree in Agronomy. He also took courses on Real Estate and Appraisals.

== Professional career ==
González began working as an agricultural scientist for the Corporation of Rural Development. He also worked as administrator of the Center of Machinery in Utuado.

== Political career ==
González became Mayor of Jayuya after being elected at the 1996 general election. After that, he has been elected seven consecutive terms until the present.

== Personal life ==
González married Hilda M. Huertas on July 30, 1977, who worked as Administrative Secretary of the Agricultural Extension of Jayuya. They have three children together: Jorge O., Marially, and Jorge L.
