= Jayuya, Puerto Rico =

Town and municipality in Puerto Rico

Jayuya Municipio Autónomo de Jayuya
- Town and Municipality
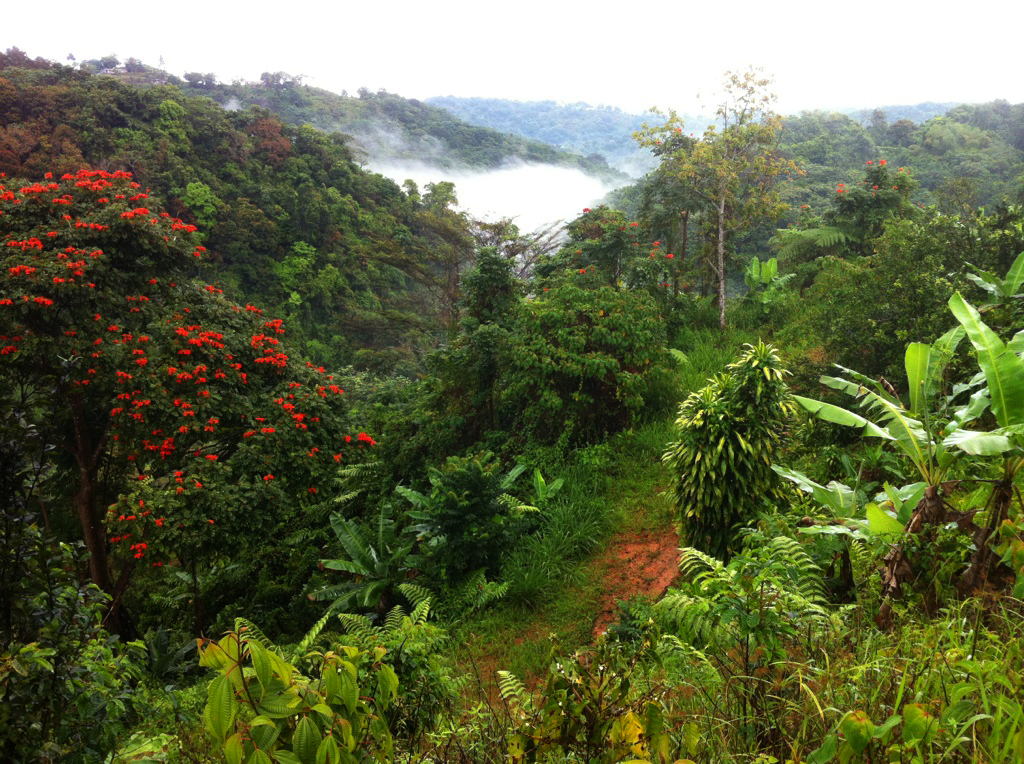
- Lush vegetation and mountains in Jayuya

- Flag Coat of arms
- Nickname: La Capital Indigena
- Anthem: "Ante nos se yergue"
- Map of Puerto Rico highlighting Jayuya Municipality
- Coordinates: 18°13′07″N 66°35′30″W
- Sovereign state: United States
- Commonwealth: Puerto Rico
- Settled: 1878
- Founded: March 9, 1911
- Founder: Diego Maldonado
- Named for: Hayuya
- Barrios: 11 barrios: Coabey; Collores; Jauca; Jayuya Abajo; Jayuya barrio-pueblo; Mameyes Arriba; Pica; Río Grande; Saliente; Veguitas; Zamas

Government
  - Mayor: Jorge "Georgie" González Otero (PPD)
  - Senatorial dist.: 5 – Ponce

Area
  - Total: 39.4 sq mi (102.1 km^{2})
- Elevation: 1,420 ft (430 m)

Population (2020)
  - Total: 14,779
  - Estimate (2025): 14,423 ▼
  - Rank: 70th in Puerto Rico
  - Density: 374.9/sq mi (144.8/km^{2})

Racial groups
  - 2020 Census: 52.4% Multiracial; 23.3% White; 7.5% Black; 0.5% American Ind/AN; 21.3% Other
- Time zone: UTC−4 (AST)
- ZIP Code: 00664
- Area code: 787/939
- Major routes: link = Puerto Rico Highway 140 link = Puerto Rico Highway 141 link = Puerto Rico Highway 143 link = Puerto Rico Highway 144

Jayuya (Spanish pronunciation: [xaˈʝuʝa]) is a town and municipality of Puerto Rico located in the mountainous center region of the island, north of Ponce; east of Utuado; and west of Ciales. Jayuya is spread over 10 barrios and Jayuya Pueblo (the downtown and administrative center of the city). It is the principal city of the Jayuya Micropolitan Statistical Area.

Named after the Taíno tribal leader, Hayuya, Jayuya is known for its skilled wood carvers. Among its monuments are the statue of Nemesio Canales and the bust of Hayuya, both by the Puerto Rican sculptor Tomás Batista.

== History ==
The town of Jayuya was founded in 1911, but history traces non-indigenous settlers living in the region as far back as 1878. At that time, a small community was established there, separated from the larger cities of the coasts with little to no communication. Near the end of the 19th century, the town focused on the production of coffee, which greatly boosted the local economy.

In 1911, the town was officially declared a municipality with a population of more than 9,000.

In 1950, the town was the setting of the Jayuya Uprising, in which Nationalists started a revolt against the Government of the United States led by Blanca Canales, a social worker, and her cousins, Elio and Doris Torresola. Canales led the group into the main town square and gave a speech, declaring Puerto Rico an independent republic. The police station was later attacked, telephone lines cut, and the post office burned to the ground. One police officer was killed and three others wounded in these attacks. The group held the town for three days, until it was bombed by U.S. planes supporting a ground attack by the Puerto Rico National Guard. Even though an extensive part of the town was destroyed, the news of the American bombing was not reported outside of Puerto Rico. Instead, it was reported by the American media stateside as an incident between Puerto Ricans.

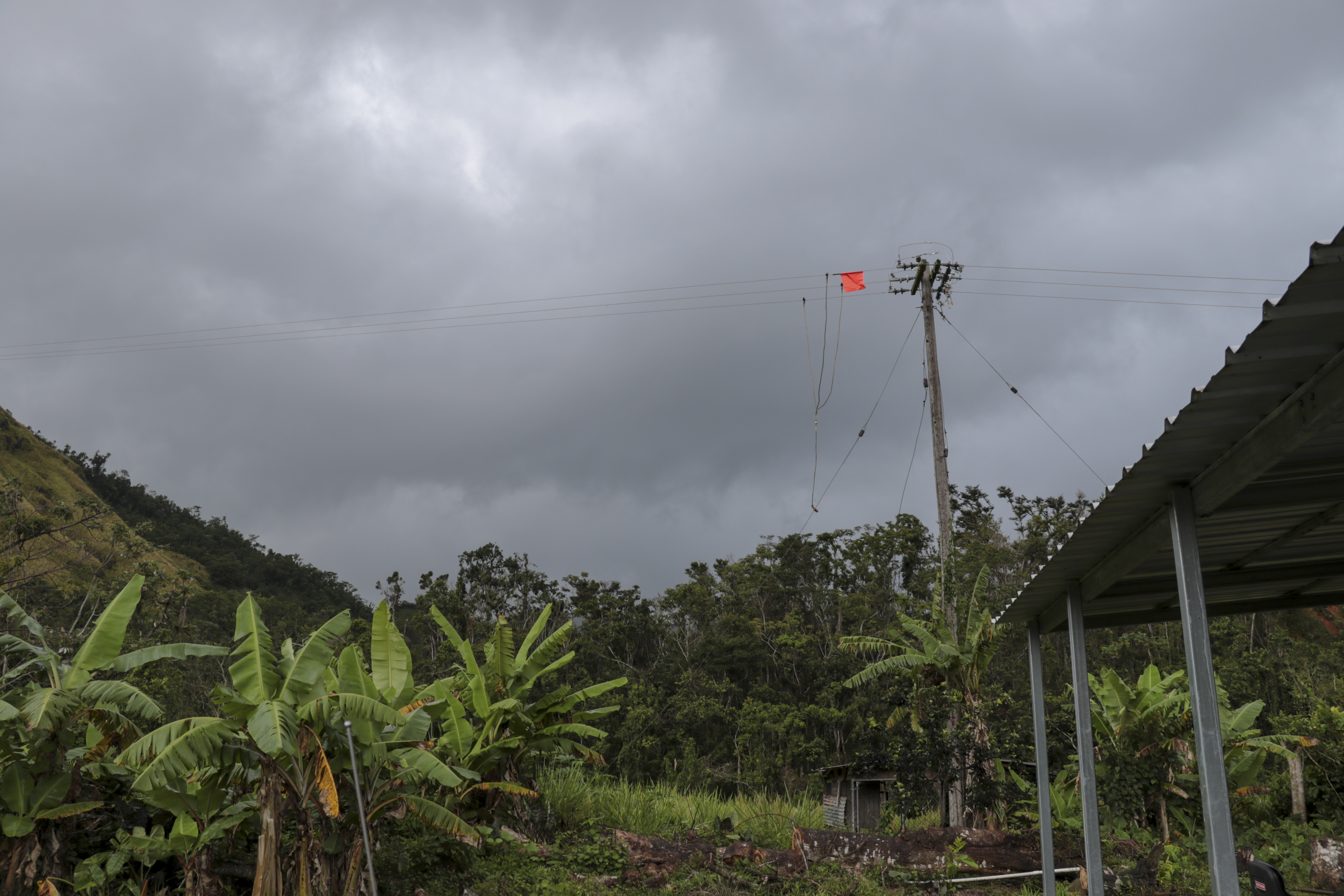
On April 21, 2018, the United States Army Corps of Engineers was working on electrical infrastructure in Jayuya.

When Hurricane Maria hit Puerto Rico in September 2017, the people of Jayuya resorted to collecting water from mountain springs. Immediately following the hurricane, rescue and restoration efforts began by community members who gathered at the local high school. Most wooden structures were destroyed. Given that Jayuya is one of the most isolated places in Puerto Rico, volunteer doctors had to be flown in by helicopter to aid victims of the hurricane.

== Geography ==
Jayuya is located in the center of the island of Puerto Rico, in a valley in the middle of the Cordillera Central. Due to this location, its terrain is mostly rough and steep. Some of the highest mountains of the island are located in this region, including Monte Jayuya, Cerro Rosa, Tres Picachos and the highest mountain of the island, Cerro Punta, at 4,389 ft (1,338 m).

The town's total area is estimated at 39.4 square miles (102 km^{2}). Part of the Toro Negro State Forest is located within the municipality of Jayuya. Rivers like Río Naranjito and Río Yunes, as well as the Río Grande de Jayuya and its various affluents, flow through this municipality.

=== Barrios ===
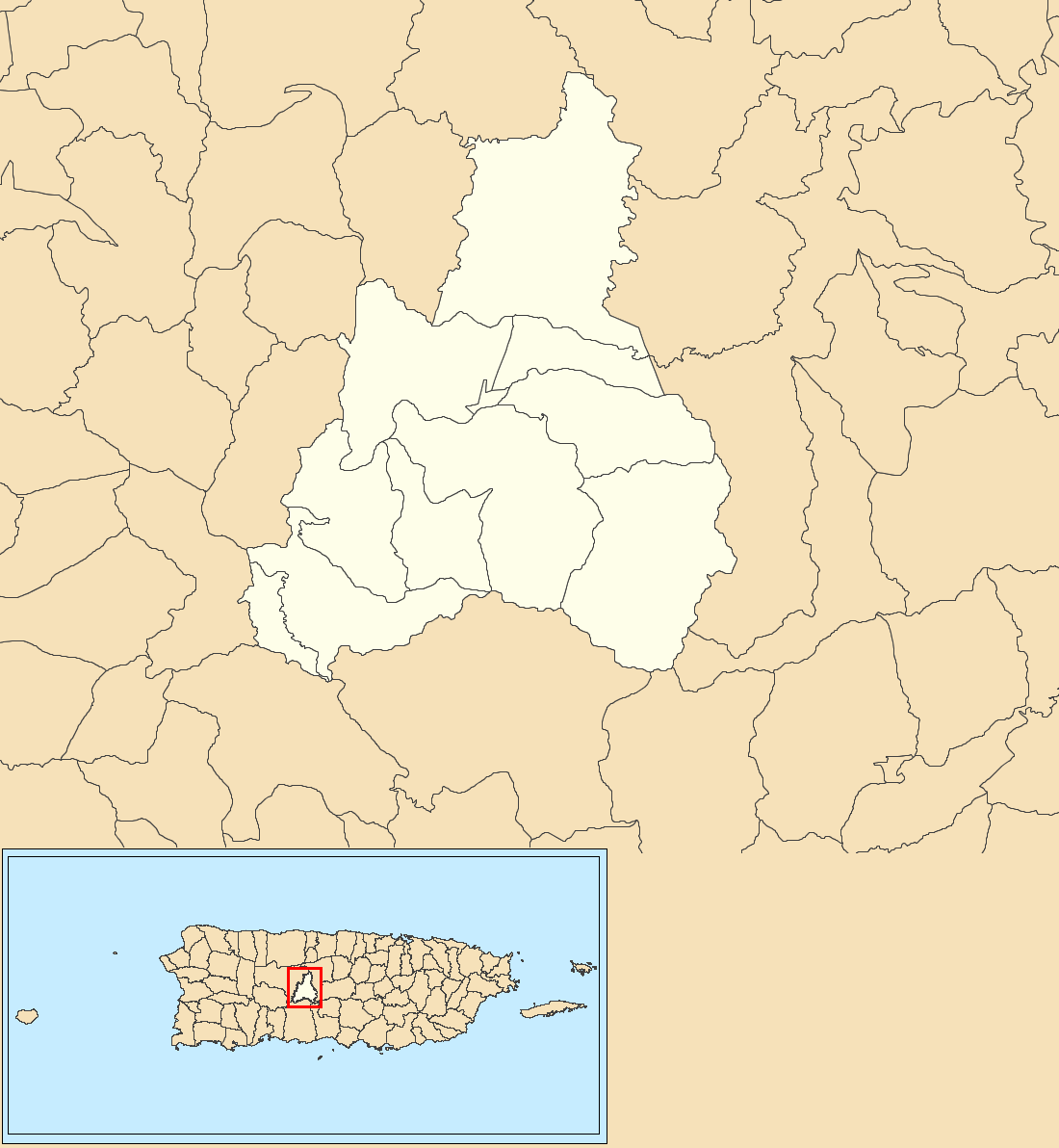
Subdivisions of Jayuya

Like all municipalities of Puerto Rico, Jayuya is subdivided into barrios. The municipal buildings, central square and large Catholic church are located in the center of the municipality, in a barrio referred to as "el pueblo".

1. Coabey
2. Collores
3. Jauca
4. Jayuya Abajo
5. Jayuya barrio-pueblo
6. Mameyes Arriba
7. Pica
8. Río Grande
9. Saliente
10. Veguitas
11. Zamas

=== Sectors ===
Barrios (which are, in contemporary times, roughly comparable to minor civil divisions) and subbarrios, are further subdivided into smaller areas called sectores (sectors in English). The types of sectores may vary, from normally sector to urbanización to reparto to barriada to residencial, among others.

=== Special Communities ===
Comunidades Especiales de Puerto Rico (Special Communities of Puerto Rico) are marginalized communities whose citizens are experiencing a certain amount of social exclusion. A map shows these communities occur in nearly every municipality of the commonwealth. Of the 742 places that were on the list in 2014, the following barrios, communities, sectors, or neighborhoods were in Jayuya: Gripiñas, Puerto Plata, Saliente, Salientito, Las Arenas, Comunidad Mario Canals (Sector El Salto), Comunidad Márquez, Hoyo Frío, Sector El Nudo, Santa Clara, Sector San Felipe, and Sector Las Casitas in Vista Alegre.

=== Climate ===
As in most municipalities located in the mountain region, the climate is mostly cool with temperatures in the 80 to 70 °F (27 to 21 °C) range. However, they are known to go as low as 50 or 60 °F (10 or 16 °C) during some winters.

== Demographics ==
Historical population
Census	Pop.	Note	%±
1920	12,463		—
1930	12,223		−1.9%
1940	14,589		19.4%
1950	15,113		3.6%
1960	14,633		−3.2%
1970	13,588		−7.1%
1980	14,722		8.3%
1990	15,527		5.5%
2000	17,318		11.5%
2010	16,642		−3.9%
2020	14,779		−11.2%
2025 (est.)	14,423	▼	−2.4%
U.S. Decennial Census; 1920–1930; 1930–1950 1960–2000 2010 2020

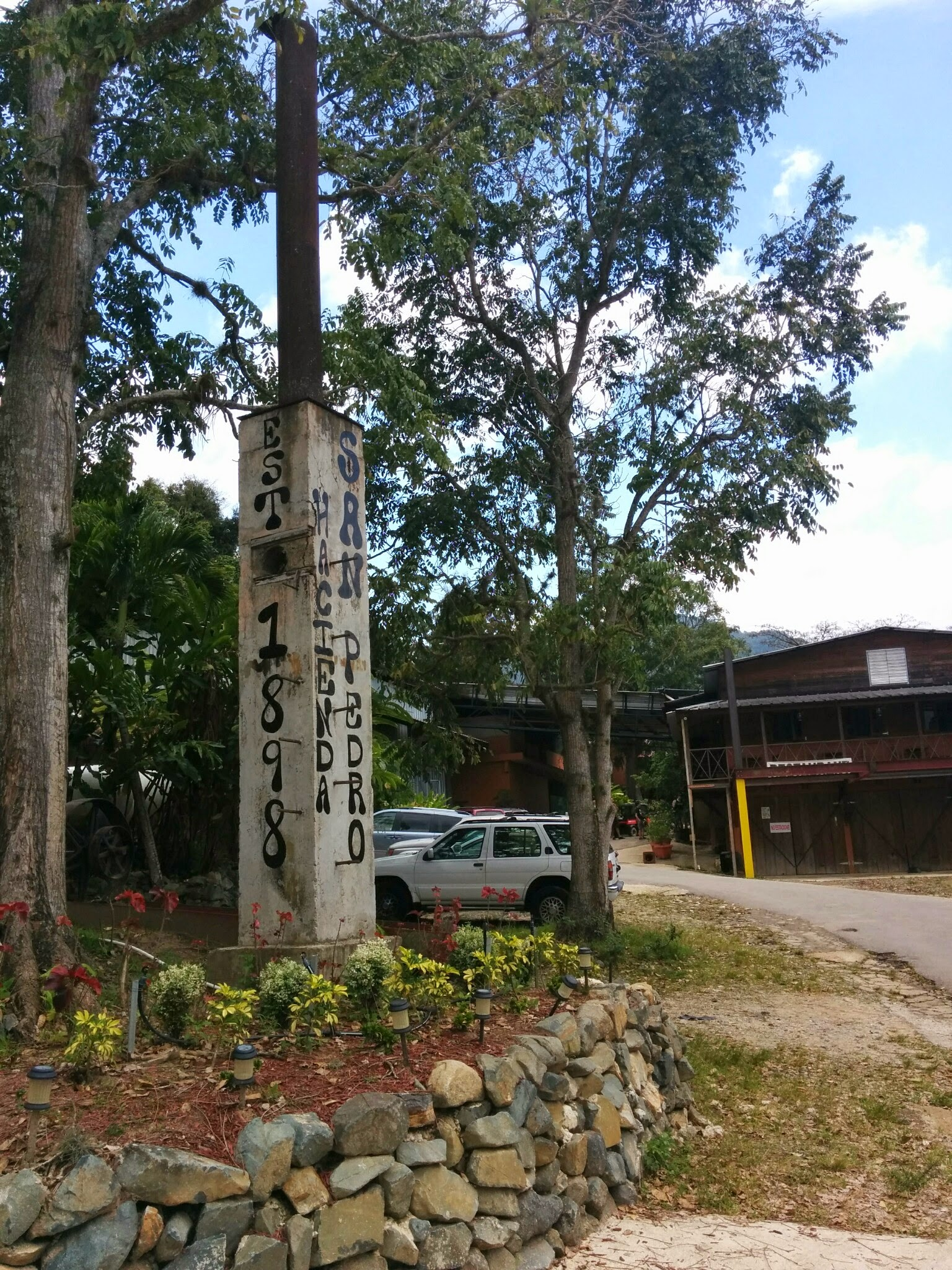
Entrance monument that says "Hacienda San Pedro Est. 1898"

== Festivals and events ==
Jayuya celebrates its patron saint festival in September. The Fiestas Patronales Nuestra Señora de la Monserrate is a religious and cultural celebration that generally features parades, games, artisans, amusement rides, regional food, and live entertainment. The festival has featured live performances by well-known artists such as Victor Manuelle.

Other festivals and events celebrated in Jayuya include:

- Three Kings Festival- January
- Jíbaro Tomato Festival- February
- National Indigenous Festival- November
- La Monserrate Marathon- September

== Tourism ==
Due to its location, Jayuya is usually mentioned as the obligatory municipality to visit when visiting the center of the island of Puerto Rico. There are several landmarks for tourists to consider like the Nemesio Canales Museum at his historic home and El Cemí Museum, both located in the same area on a small valley to the west of the downtown district. Also, the Taíno tomb in the city's downtown has the remains of a Taíno Indian found in an excavation. Nearby, there's a monument to Chief Hayuya, cacique of the region.

In the outskirts of the city, tourists can visit the Cerro de Punta, highest peak in the island of Puerto Rico, as well as the other mountains mentioned (Tres Picachos, for example). The Toro Negro State Forest can also be reached through the city.

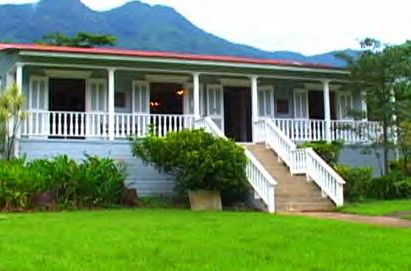
Casa Museo Canales

Jayuya is home to the first aerostat in Puerto Rico and one of the world's largest. It is located in barrio Mameyes, at 3,200 feet above sea level. When the aerostat lifts, it reaches 3,500 feet where it has a panoramic view of 360 degrees.

Coffee production can be seen at Hacienda San Pedro located in Jayuya.

== Economy ==
=== Agriculture ===
Jayuya's economy has always depended greatly on agriculture. Products like coffee, tomato, and other vegetables are produced and distributed in the region. Livestock is another part of the city's economy.

=== Industry ===
In the middle of the 20th century, several manufacturing industries established in Jayuya, aiming to revitalize the economy as well as provide work for the residents. Some of the companies currently in the city are Baxter Healthcare and Abbott Laboratories. A bridge used by these companies for the delivery of their materials to their plants was destroyed by Hurricane Maria. Work was set to begin on the bridge in 2019.

== Government ==
Like all municipalities in Puerto Rico, Jayuya is administered by a mayor. The current mayor is Jorge González Otero, from the Popular Democratic Party (PPD). González was first elected at the 1996 general election.

The city belongs to the Puerto Rico Senatorial district III, which is represented by two Senators. In 2024, Brenda Pérez Soto and Gabriel González were elected as District Senators.

== Transportation ==
There are 34 bridges in Jayuya.

== Education ==
As all other municipalities in the island, Jayuya is part of the Puerto Rico Department of Education. It has several elementary schools distributed throughout the city's barrios. However, there's currently only one public high school, Josefina León Zayas High School, located in the city's downtown. The high school is LEED certified, for having a green-building design.

The Metropolitan University, a private institution, has a campus in the municipality's downtown area.

== Former mayors ==
- 1883 Julio Grau Battle – District Commissioner
- 1911–16 Rosario Canales
- 1916–20 Juan de Jesús López
- 1920–24 Ramón B. Marrero
- 1928 José Rivera Aponte (3 months)
- 1928–36 Jesús Dávila Rodríguez
- 1936–40 Vicente Santiago Reyes – Coalition Republican-Socialist
- 1940–44 Juan Oliver Frau PPD
- 1944 Mario Canales Torresola PPD (intern)
- 1944–48 Manuel Diversé PPD
- 1948–52 Ramón de Jesús Soto PPD
- 1952–68 Adrián Torres Torres PPD
- 1968–72 Rafael A. Ríos Delgado PNP
- 1972–76 José D. "Lolo" Castro González PPD
- 1976–84 Antonio Reyes Santiago PNP
- 1984–92 Venancio A. Tejedor León PPD
- 1992–96 José A. Rivera Rodríguez PNP
- 1996 -Jorge L. González Otero(PPD)

== Additional information ==
- July 11, 1883 – The first parish was established
- March 9, 1911 – Municipality was established

== Symbols ==
The municipio has an official flag and coat of arms.

=== Flag ===
The flag is rectangular in shape and derives its symbolism from the coat of arms. It symbolizes the spirit of people proud of their Taíno heritage and their hospitality.

=== Coat of arms ===
Jayuya's coat of arms consists of a shield with a three tower crown above, which is standard for municipalities. Inside the shield, centered at the top, a crown representing Chief Hayuya's monarchy. In the center a green band with a white border representing the Tres Picachos (Three Peaks) mountains. The green color symbolizes the countryside and the town's matron, La Virgen de la Monserrate. At the bottom of the shield, is a petroglyph known as the Taíno Sun found in Jayuya.

== Gallery ==
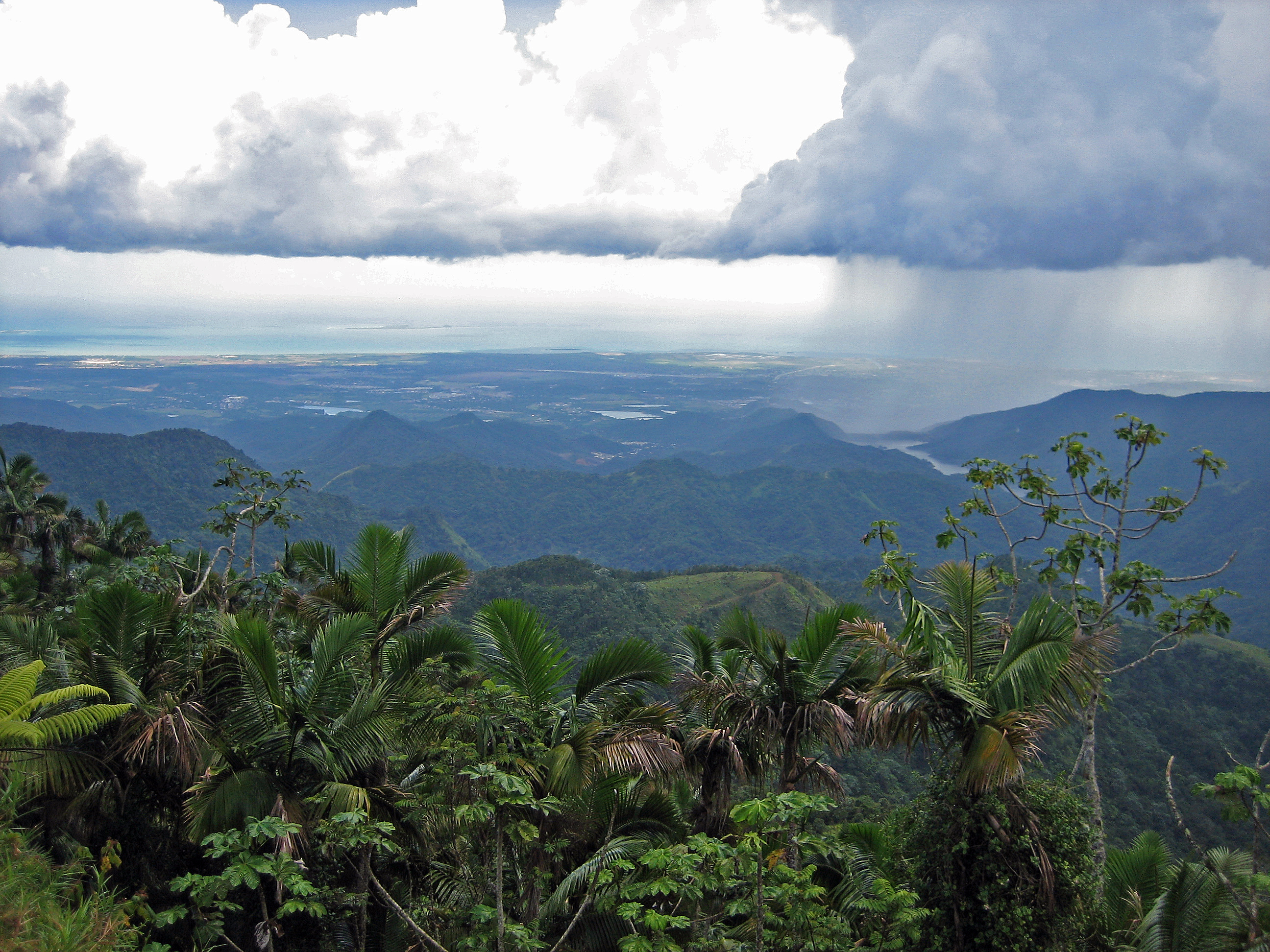
Puerto Rico's south shore, from the mountains of Jayuya, taken from Highway 143

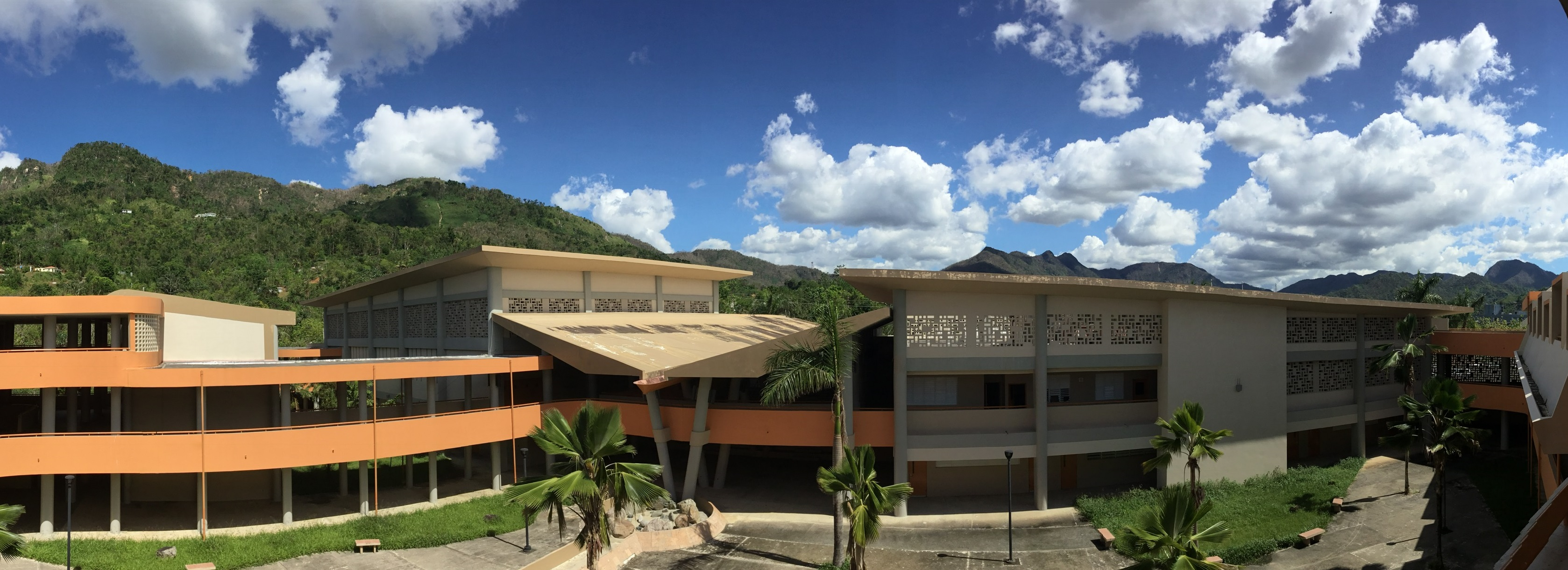
School damaged by Hurricane Maria in 2017

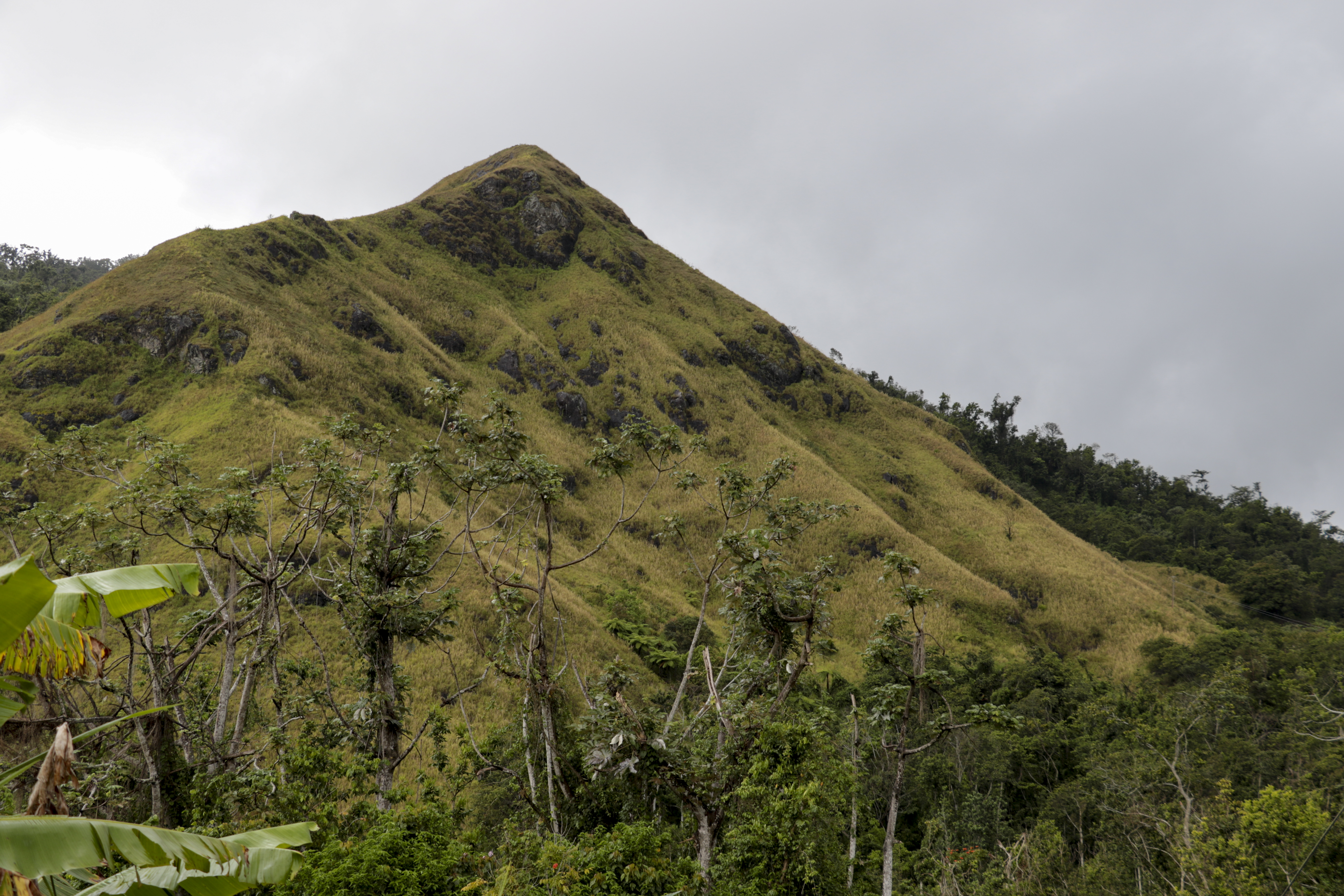
Mountain in Jayuya

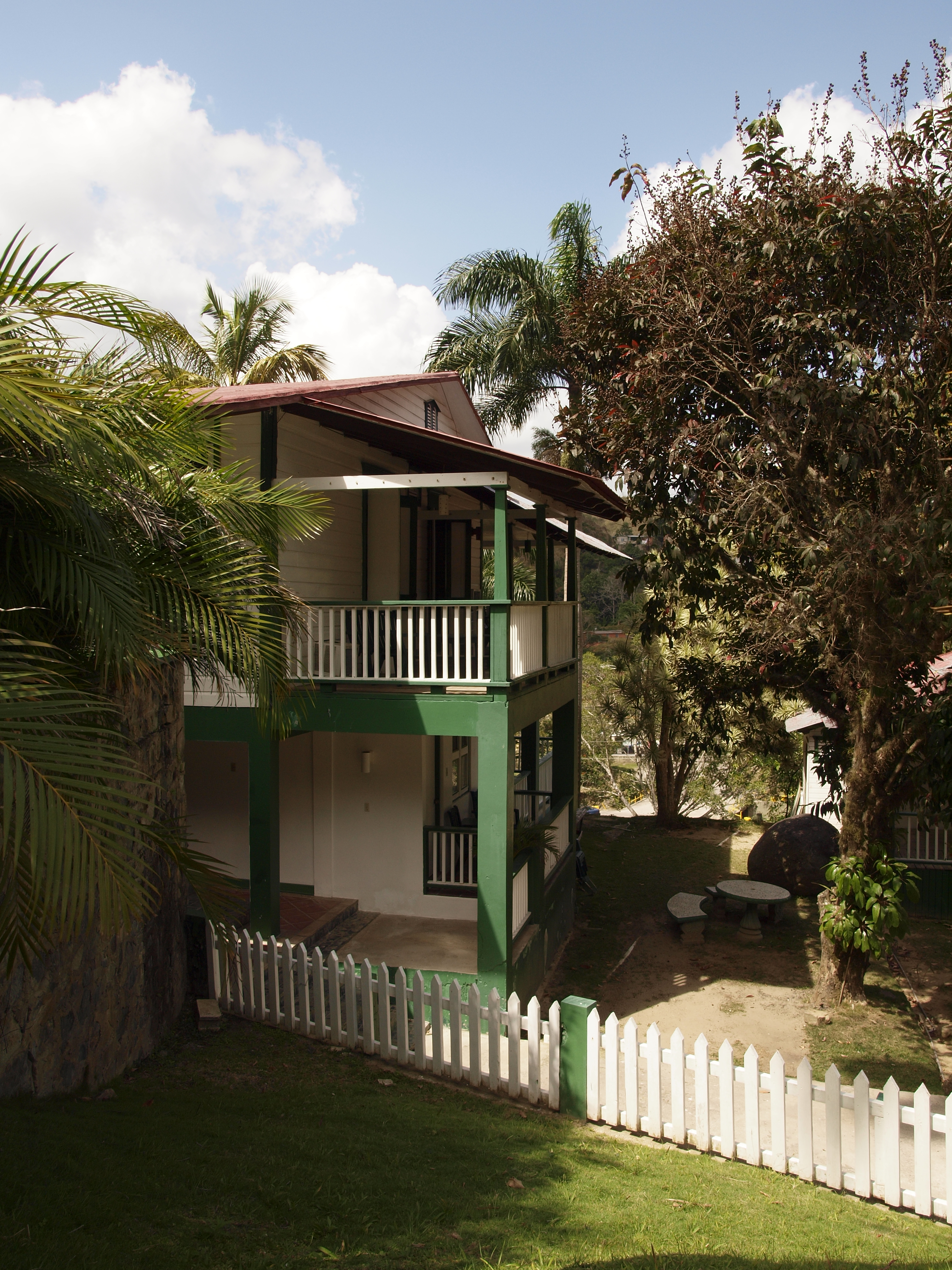
Hacienda Gripiñas in Jayuya

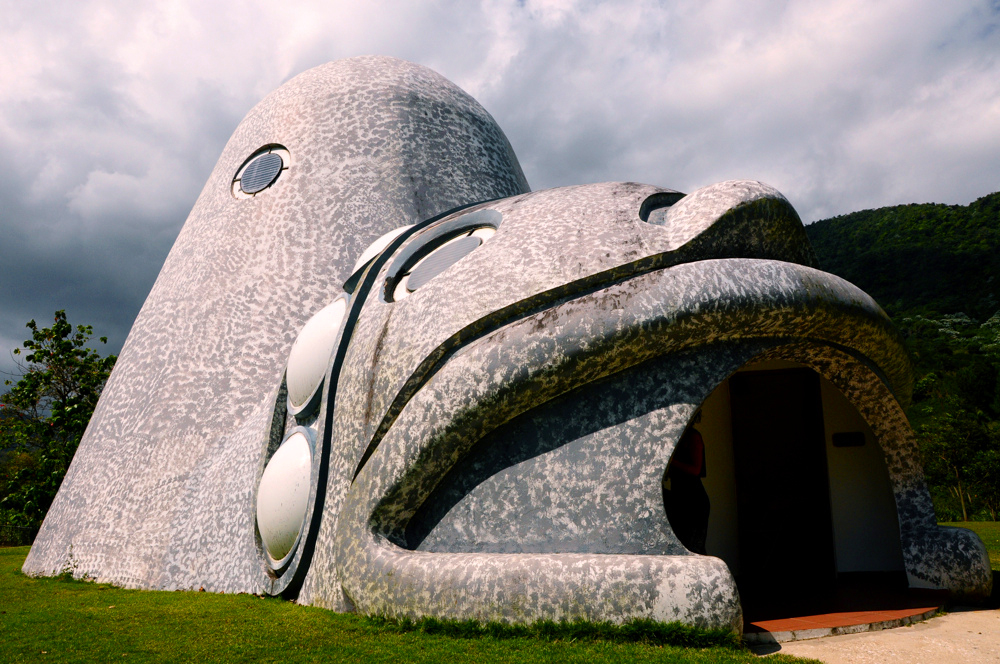
Cemi Museum in Coabey

== See also ==
- List of Puerto Ricans
- History of Puerto Rico
