= Saliente =

Barrio in Jayuya, Puerto Rico

- Barrio
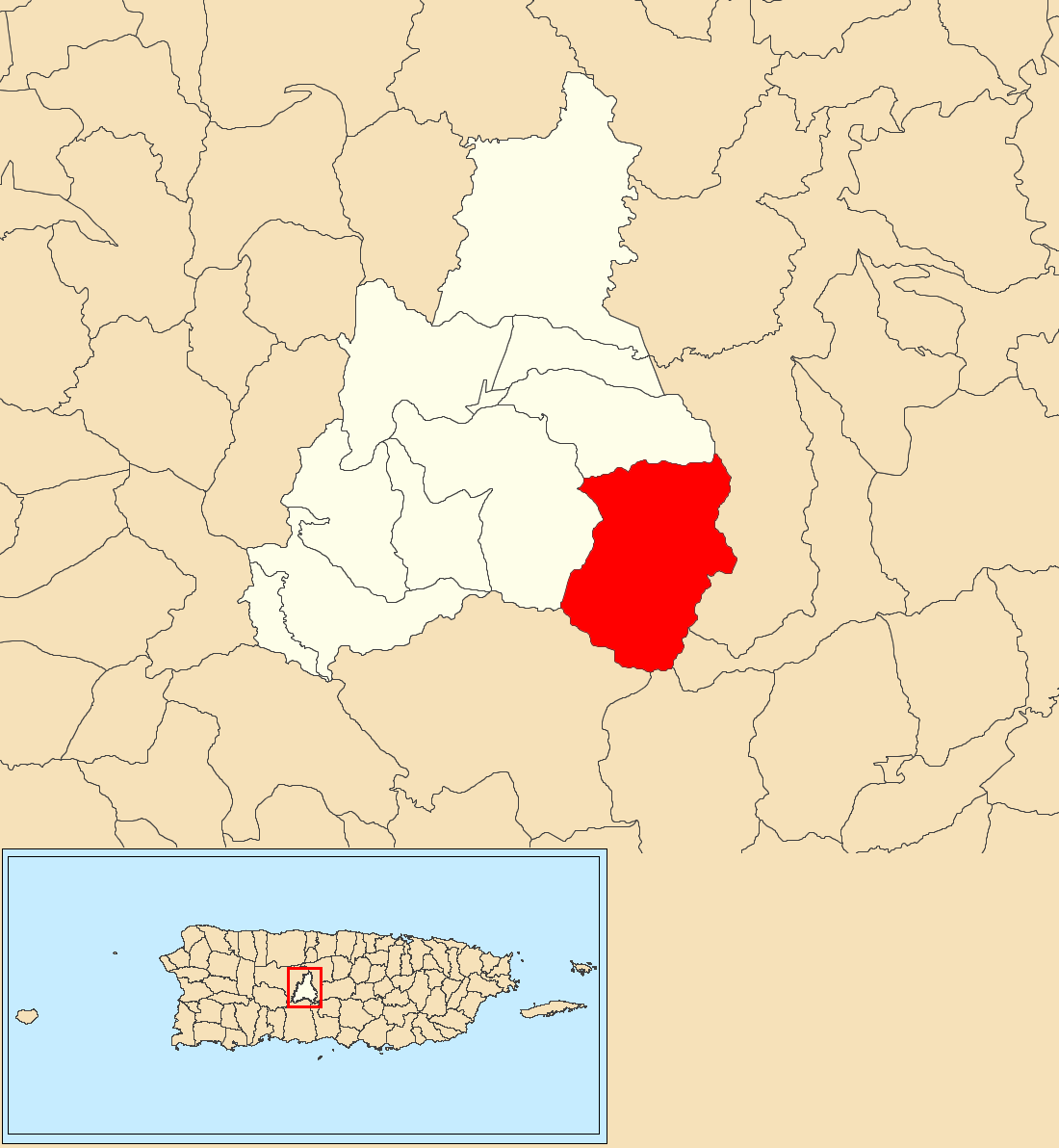
- Location of Saliente within the municipality of Jayuya shown in red

- Location of Puerto Rico
- Coordinates: 18°10′48″N 66°33′09″W
- Commonwealth: Puerto Rico
- Municipality: Jayuya

Area
  - Total: 6.92 sq mi (17.9 km^{2})
  - Land: 6.92 sq mi (17.9 km^{2})
  - Water: 0.00 sq mi (0 km^{2})
- Elevation: 2,533 ft (772 m)

Population (2010)
  - Total: 649
  - Density: 93.8/sq mi (36.2/km^{2})
- Source: 2010 Census
- Time zone: UTC−4 (AST)
- ZIP Code: 00664
- Area code: 787/939

Saliente is a barrio in the municipality of Jayuya, Puerto Rico. Its population in 2010 was 649.

Historical population
Census	Pop.	Note	%±
1950	1,072		—
1960	1,256		17.2%
1970	892		−29.0%
1980	782		−12.3%
1990	721		−7.8%
2000	646		−10.4%
2010	649		0.5%
U.S. Decennial Census; 1899 (shown as 1900) 1910-1930; 1930-1950 1980-2000 2010

== See also ==
- List of communities in Puerto Rico
