= Coabey =

Barrio of Jayuya, Puerto Rico

- Barrio
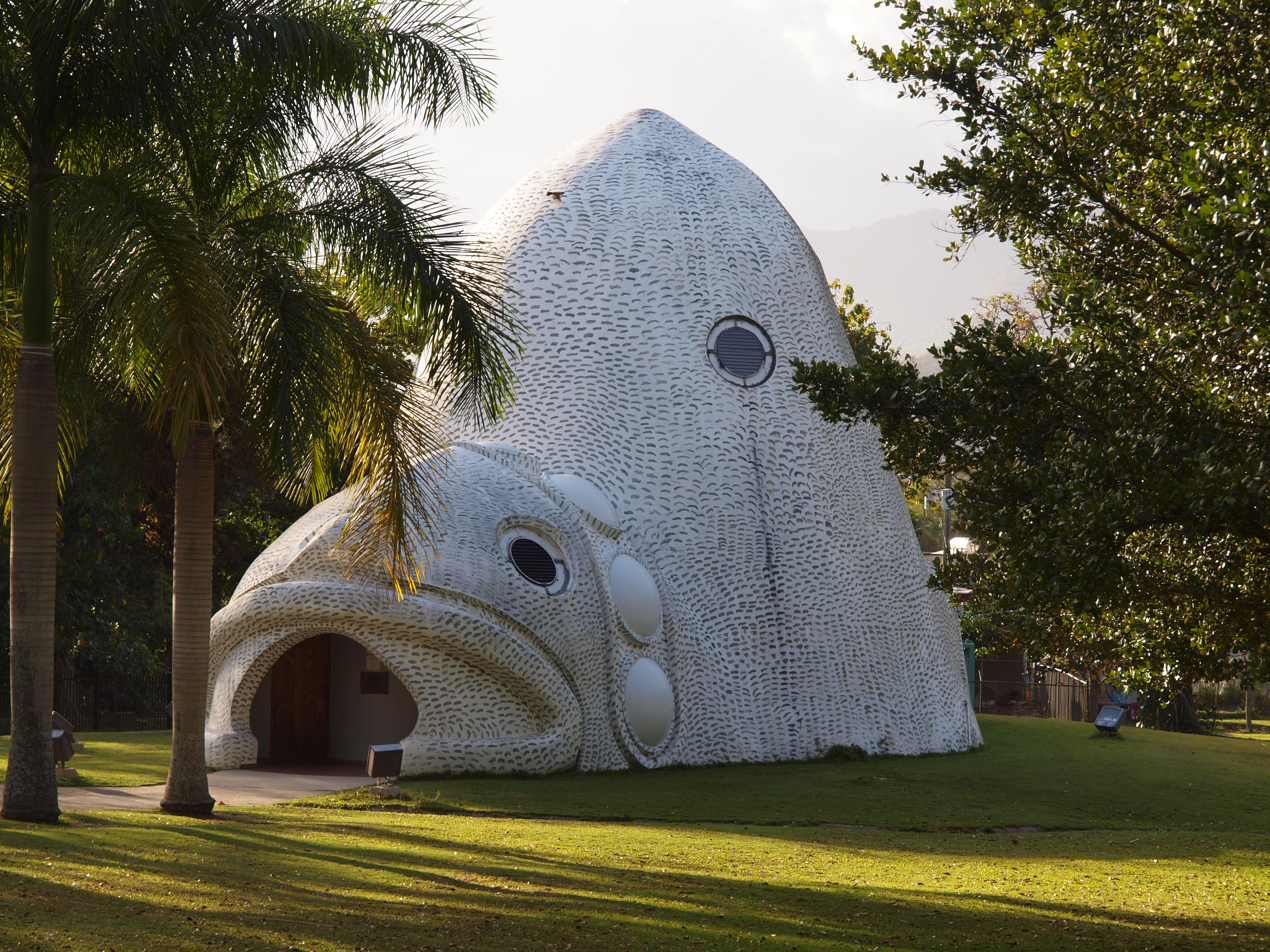
- Cemi Museum in Coabey

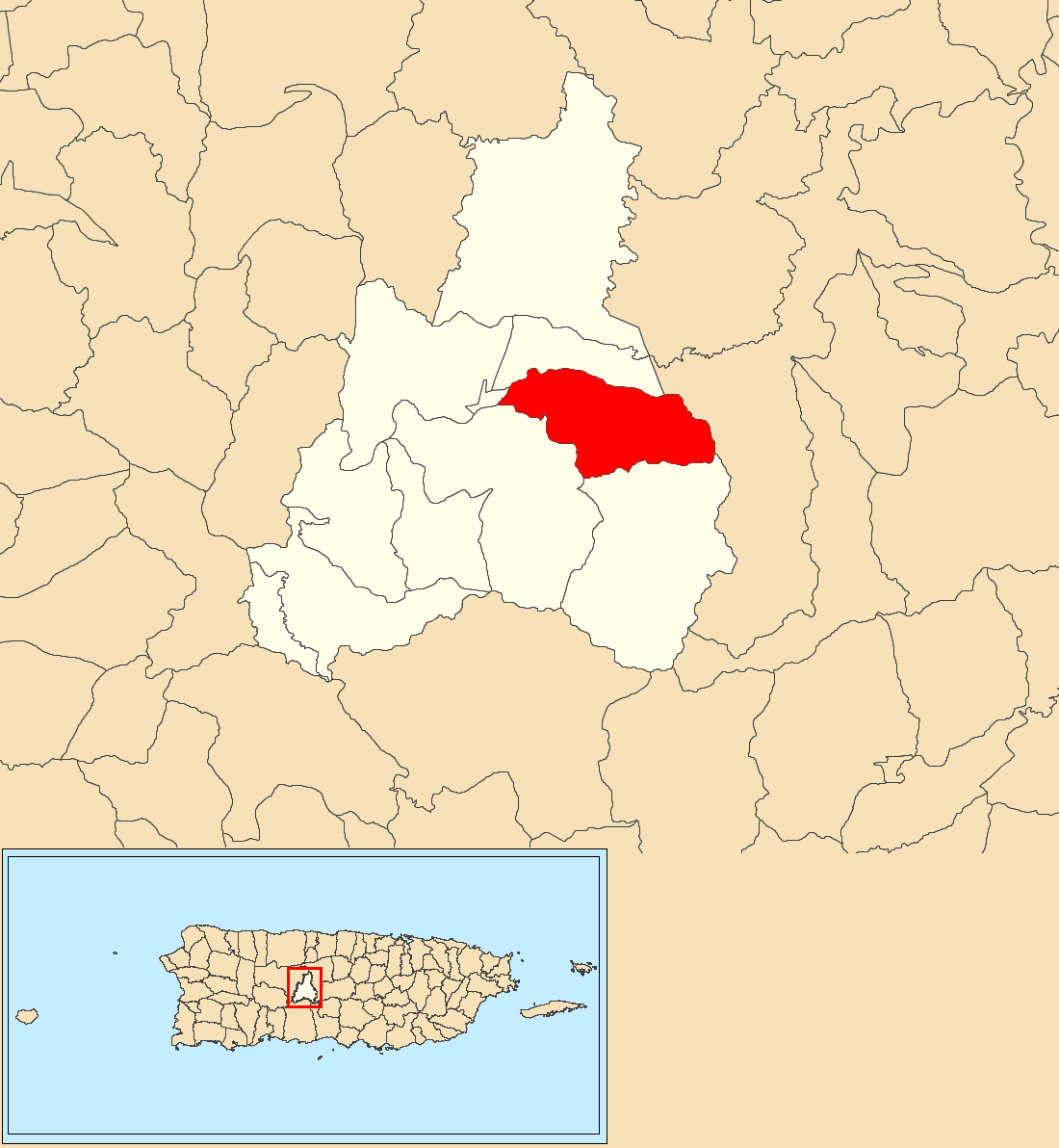
- Location of Coabey within the municipality of Jayuya shown in red

- Location of Puerto Rico
- Coordinates: 18°12′51″N 66°33′44″W
- Commonwealth: Puerto Rico
- Municipality: Jayuya

Area
  - Total: 3.81 sq mi (9.9 km^{2})
  - Land: 3.81 sq mi (9.9 km^{2})
  - Water: 0.00 sq mi (0 km^{2})
- Elevation: 1,880 ft (570 m)

Population (2010)
  - Total: 2,166
  - Density: 568.5/sq mi (219.5/km^{2})
- Source: 2010 Census
- Time zone: UTC−4 (AST)
- ZIP Code: 00664
- Area code: 787/939

Coabey is a barrio in the municipality of Jayuya, Puerto Rico. Its population in 2010 was 2,166. Coabey is a newer barrio which was formed from areas of Jayuya barrio-pueblo and its first census was done in 1930.

Historical population
Census	Pop.	Note	%±
1930	680		—
1940	959		41.0%
1950	1,277		33.2%
1960	1,118		−12.5%
1970	1,079		−3.5%
1980	1,286		19.2%
1990	1,753		36.3%
2000	2,069		18.0%
2010	2,166		4.7%
U.S. Decennial Census; 1930; 1930-1950 1980-2000 2010

== Features ==
The El Cemí Museum (Museo El Cemí) is in Coabey, Jayuya. The museum features Taíno history.

The Casa Canales Museum (Museo Casa Canales) is in Coabey. The museum features the events and people surrounding the Jayuya Uprising event in 1950.

== Gallery ==
Places in Coabey

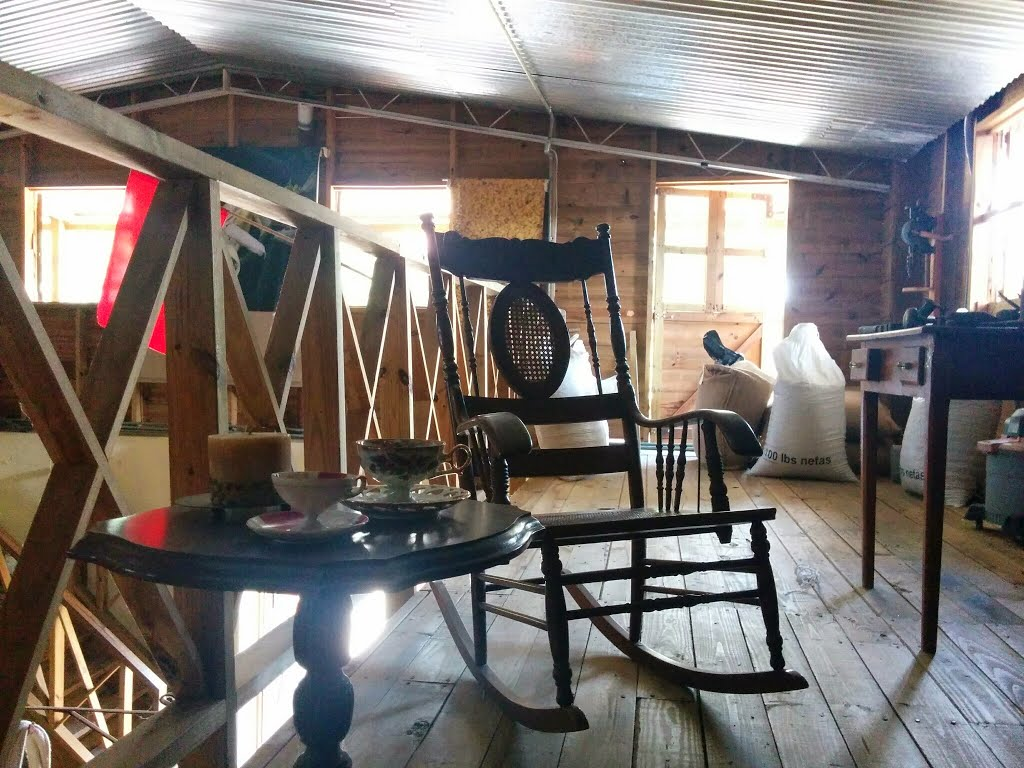
Hacienda San Pedro Museum

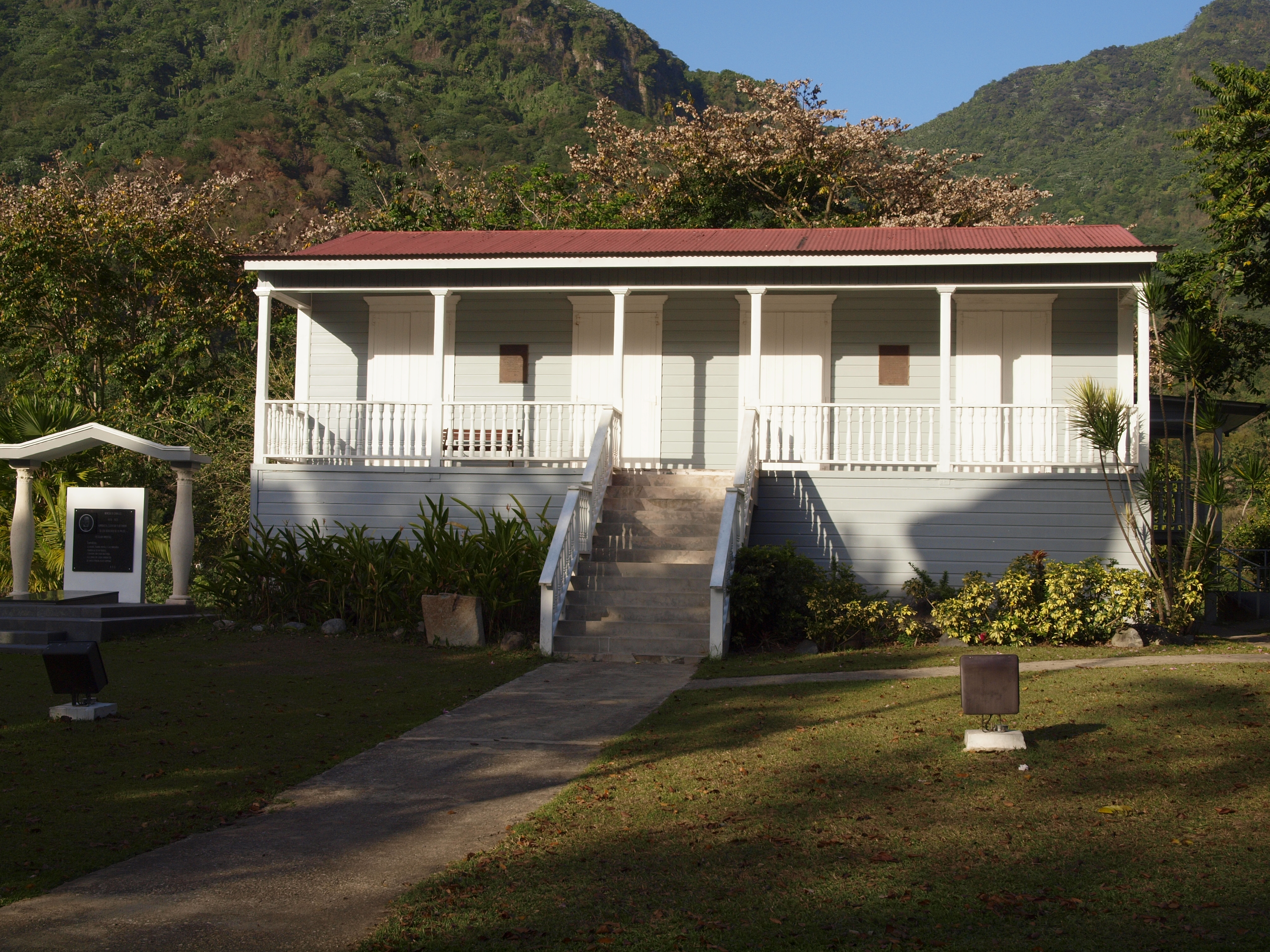
Museo Casa Canales

== See also ==
- List of communities in Puerto Rico
