= Zamas, Jayuya, Puerto Rico =

Barrio of Puerto Rico

Zamas
- Barrio
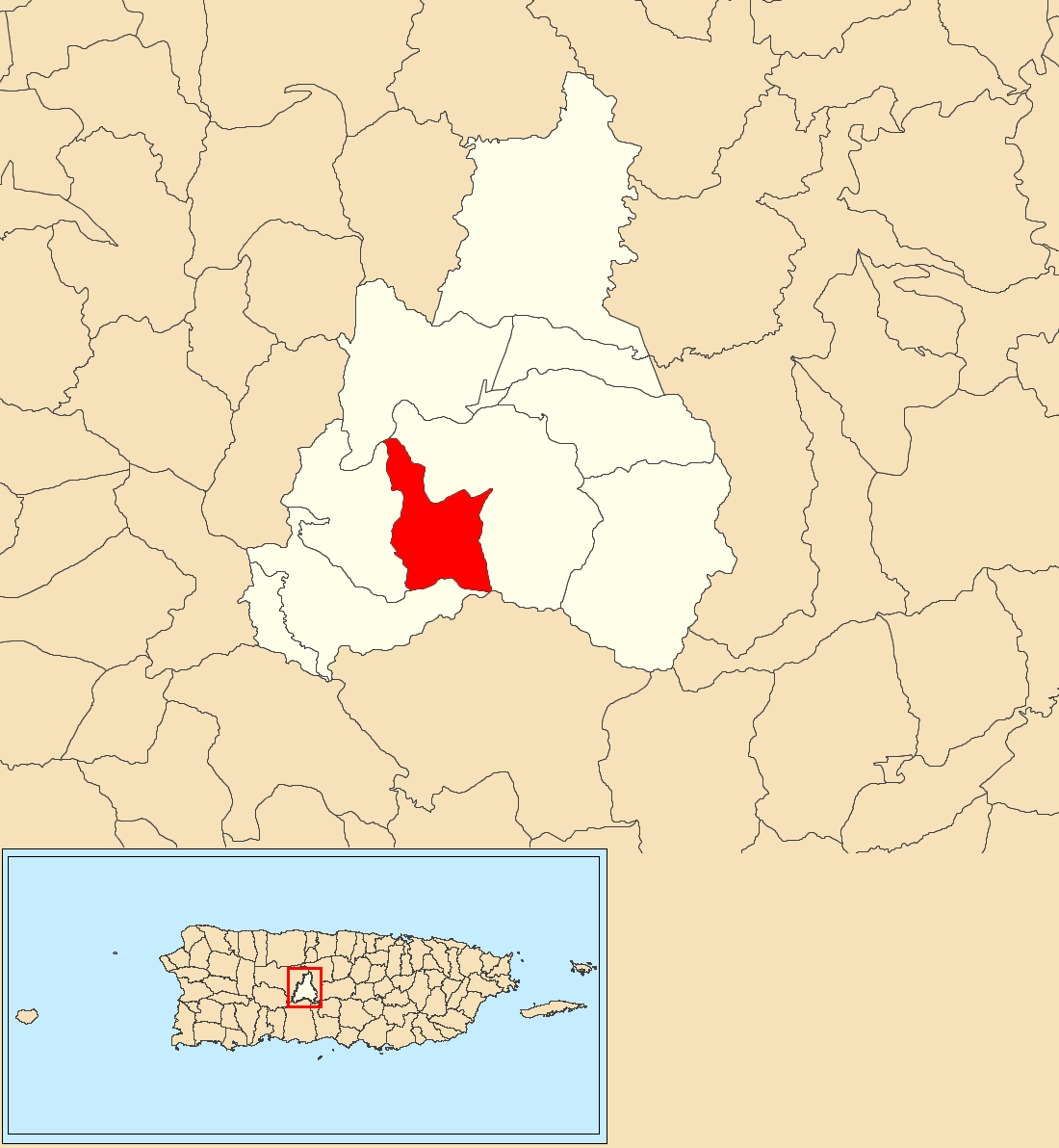
- Location of Zamas within the municipality of Jayuya shown in red

- Location of Puerto Rico
- Coordinates: 18°11′15″N 66°36′20″W
- Commonwealth: Puerto Rico
- Municipality: Jayuya

Area
  - Total: 2.51 sq mi (6.5 km^{2})
  - Land: 2.51 sq mi (6.5 km^{2})
  - Water: 0.00 sq mi (0 km^{2})
- Elevation: 1,870 ft (570 m)

Population (2010)
  - Total: 499
  - Density: 198.8/sq mi (76.8/km^{2})
- Source: 2010 Census
- Time zone: UTC−4 (AST)
- ZIP Code: 00664
- Area code: 787/939

Zamas is a barrio in the municipality of Jayuya, Puerto Rico. Its population in 2010 was 499.

Historical population
Census	Pop.	Note	%±
1950	887		—
1960	491		−44.6%
1970	407		−17.1%
1980	506		24.3%
1990	491		−3.0%
2000	607		23.6%
2010	499		−17.8%
U.S. Decennial Census; 1900 (N/A) 1910-1930; 1930-1950 1980-2000 2010

== See also ==
- List of communities in Puerto Rico
