= Jayuya barrio-pueblo =

Historical and administrative center (seat) of Jayuya, Puerto Rico

Jayuya barrio-pueblo Pueblo de Jayuya
- Municipality Seat
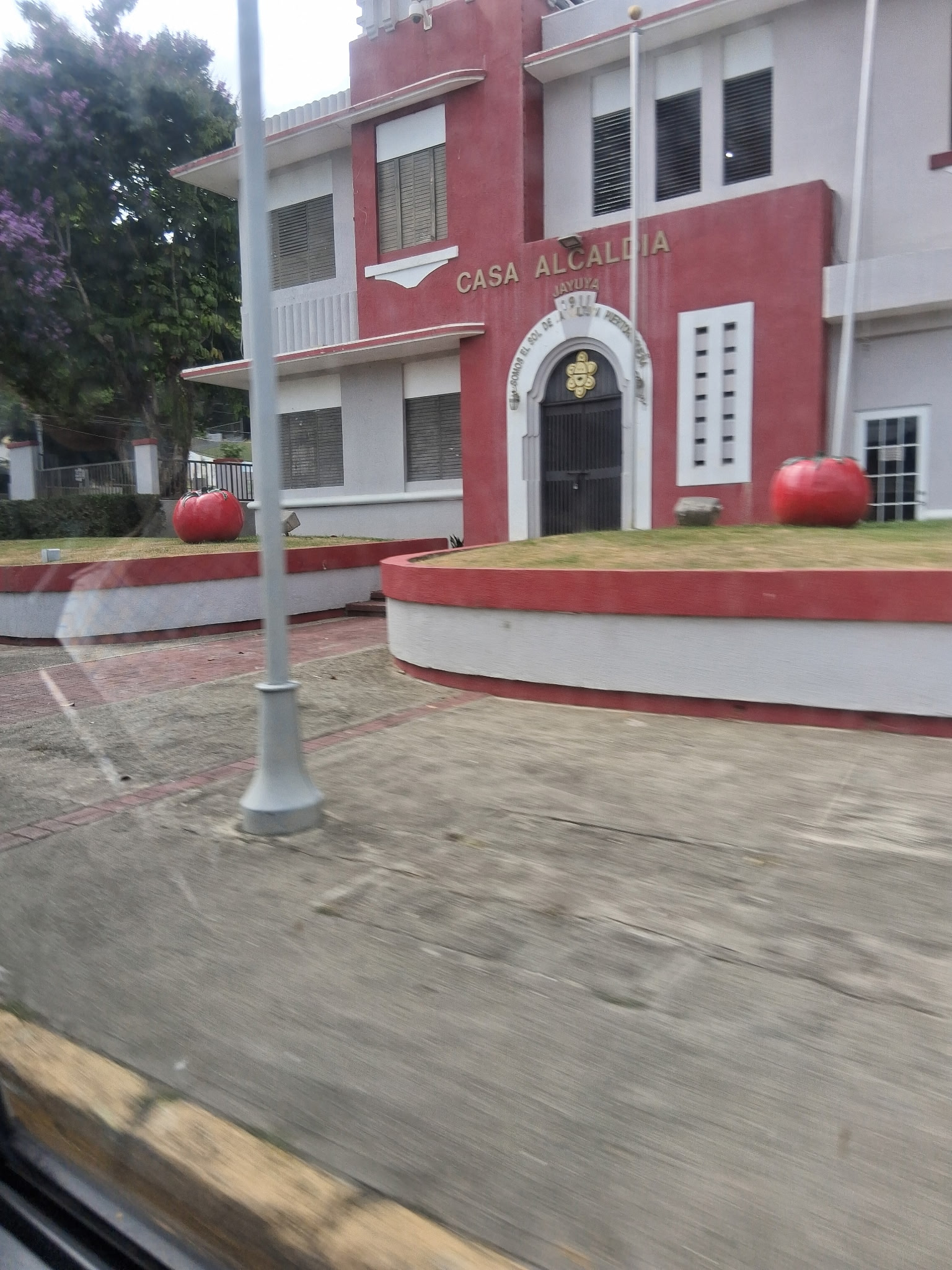
- City Hall of Jayuya on PR-144

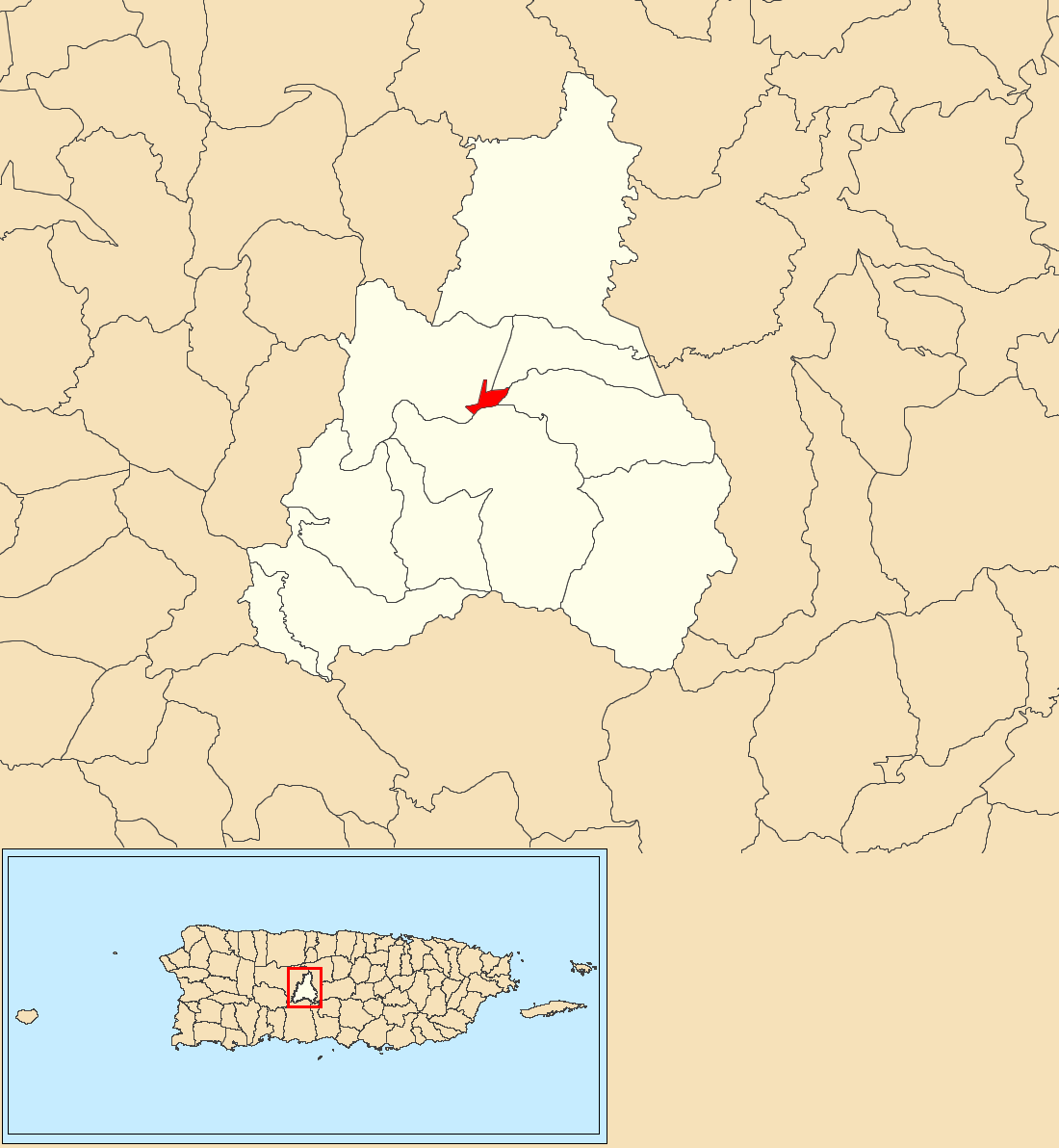
- Location of Jayuya barrio-pueblo within the municipality of Jayuya shown in red

- Location of Puerto Rico
- Coordinates: 18°13′11″N 66°35′33″W
- Commonwealth: Puerto Rico
- Municipality: Jayuya

Area
  - Total: 0.14 sq mi (0.36 km^{2})
  - Land: 0.14 sq mi (0.36 km^{2})
  - Water: 0.00 sq mi (0 km^{2})
- Elevation: 1,509 ft (460 m)

Population (2010)
  - Total: 1,222
  - Density: 8,728.6/sq mi (3,370.1/km^{2})
- Source: 2010 Census
- Time zone: UTC−4 (AST)
- ZIP Code: 00664
- Area code: 787/939

Jayuya barrio-pueblo is a barrio and the administrative center (seat) of Jayuya, a municipality of Puerto Rico. Its population in 2010 was 1,222.

As was customary in Spain, in Puerto Rico, the municipality has a barrio called pueblo which contains a central plaza, the municipal buildings (city hall), and a Catholic church. Fiestas patronales (patron saint festivals) are held in the central plaza every year.

Historical population
| Census | Pop. | Note | %± |
|---|---|---|---|
| 1910 | 4,746 | | — |
| 1920 | 5,734 | | 20.8% |
| 1930 | 4,808 | | −16.1% |
| 1940 | 1,808 | | −62.4% |
| 1950 | 2,318 | | 28.2% |
| 1960 | 2,344 | | 1.1% |
| 1970 | 0 | | −100.0% |
| 1980 | 2,042 | | — |
| 1990 | 1,565 | | −23.4% |
| 2000 | 1,720 | | 9.9% |
| 2010 | 1,222 | | −29.0% |
U.S. Decennial Census; 1900 (N/A) 1910-1930; 1930-1950 1980-2000 2010

== The central plaza and its church ==
The central plaza, or square, is a place for official and unofficial recreational events and a place where people can gather and socialize from dusk to dawn. The Laws of the Indies, Spanish law, which regulated life in Puerto Rico in the early 19th century, stated the plaza's purpose was for "the parties" (celebrations, festivities) (Spanish: a propósito para las fiestas), and that the square should be proportionally large enough for the number of neighbors (Spanish: grandeza proporcionada al número de vecinos). These Spanish regulations also stated that the streets nearby should be comfortable portals for passersby, protecting them from the elements: sun and rain.

Located across the central plaza in Jayuya barrio-pueblo is the Parroquia Nuestra Señora de la Monserrate, a Roman Catholic church.

== Gallery ==
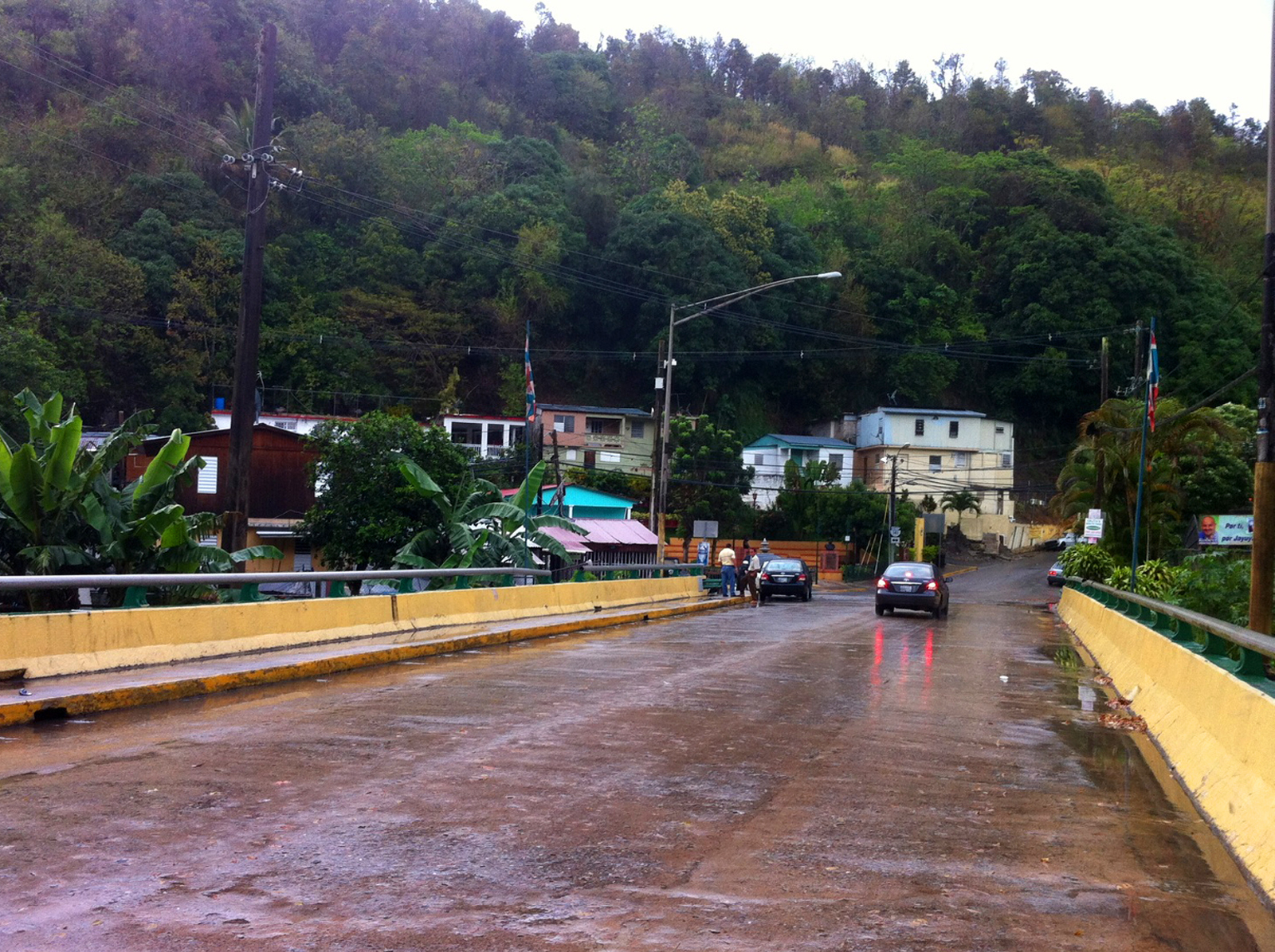
Bridge over Río Grande in Jayuya (PR 141R), entrance to barrio-pueblo on the left

== See also ==
- List of communities in Puerto Rico
