= Paso Palma =

Barrio of Utuado, Puerto Rico

- Barrio
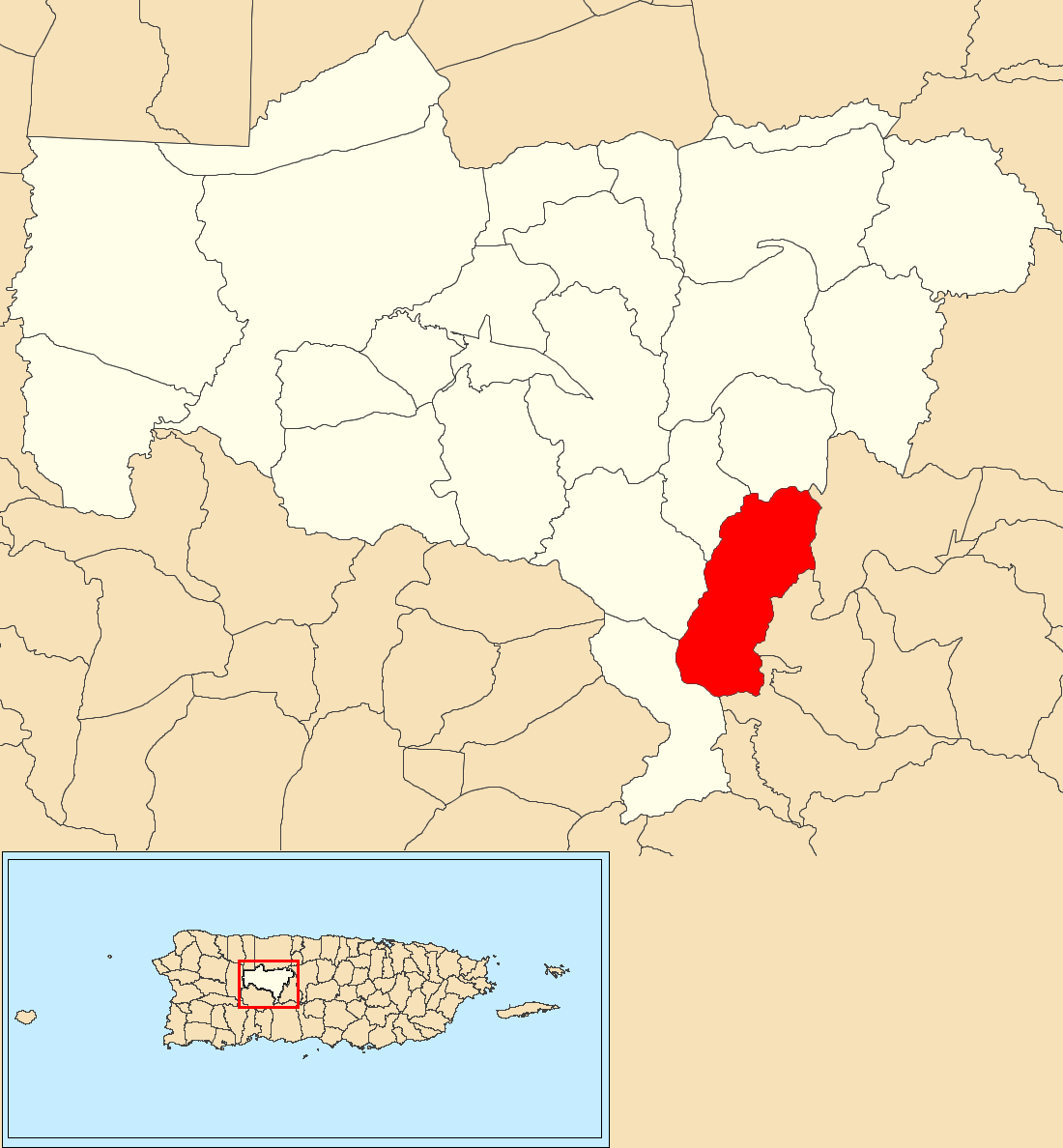
- Location of Paso Palma within the municipality of Utuado shown in red

- Location of Puerto Rico
- Coordinates: 18°12′34″N 66°38′44″W
- Commonwealth: Puerto Rico
- Municipality: Utuado

Area
  - Total: 4.82 sq mi (12.5 km^{2})
  - Land: 4.82 sq mi (12.5 km^{2})
  - Water: 0 sq mi (0 km^{2})
- Elevation: 1,207 ft (368 m)

Population (2010)
  - Total: 582
  - Density: 120.7/sq mi (46.6/km^{2})
- Source: 2010 Census
- Time zone: UTC−4 (AST)

Paso Palma is a barrio in the municipality of Utuado, Puerto Rico. Its population in 2010 was 582.

== History ==
Paso Palma was in Spain's gazetteers until Puerto Rico was ceded by Spain in the aftermath of the Spanish–American War under the terms of the Treaty of Paris of 1898 and became an unincorporated territory of the United States. In 1899, the United States Department of War conducted a census of Puerto Rico finding that the population of Paso Palma barrio was 1,317.

Historical population
Census	Pop.	Note	%±
1900	1,317		—
1910	1,288		−2.2%
1920	1,098		−14.8%
1930	1,113		1.4%
1940	1,503		35.0%
1950	1,595		6.1%
1960	1,430		−10.3%
1970	1,120		−21.7%
1980	854		−23.7%
1990	664		−22.2%
2000	556		−16.3%
2010	582		4.7%
U.S. Decennial Census; 1899 (shown as 1900) 1910-1930; 1930-1950 1980-2000 2010

== See also ==
- List of communities in Puerto Rico
