= Santa Isabel, Utuado, Puerto Rico =

Barrio of Puerto Rico

Santa Isabel
- Barrio
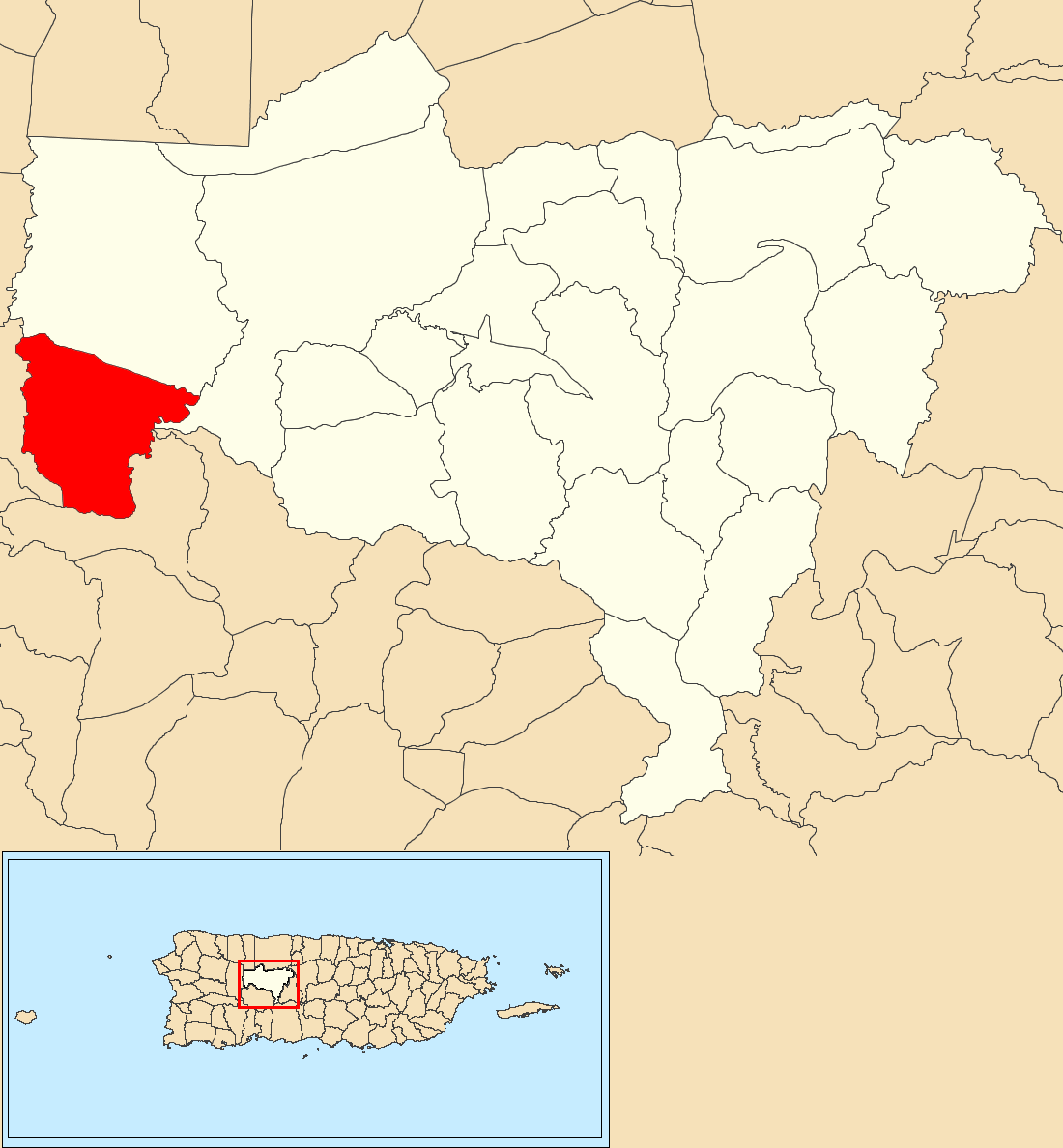
- Location of Santa Isabel within the municipality of Utuado shown in red

- Location of Puerto Rico
- Coordinates: 18°15′06″N 66°48′26″W
- Commonwealth: Puerto Rico
- Municipality: Utuado

Area
  - Total: 5.35 sq mi (13.9 km^{2})
  - Land: 5.35 sq mi (13.9 km^{2})
  - Water: 0 sq mi (0 km^{2})
- Elevation: 1,729 ft (527 m)

Population (2010)
  - Total: 660
  - Density: 123.4/sq mi (47.6/km^{2})
- Source: 2010 Census
- Time zone: UTC−4 (AST)

Santa Isabel is a barrio in the municipality of Utuado, Puerto Rico. Its population in 2010 was 660.

== Geography ==
Santa Isabel is a remote barrio situated at an elevation of 1,729 feet (527 m) just south of Ángeles in Utuado, Puerto Rico. It has an area of 5.35 square miles (13.9 km^{2}).

== History ==
Santa Isabel was in Spain's gazetteers until Puerto Rico was ceded by Spain in the aftermath of the Spanish–American War under the terms of the Treaty of Paris of 1898 and became an unincorporated territory of the United States. In 1899, the United States Department of War conducted a census of Puerto Rico finding that the population of Santa Isabel barrio was 875.

Historical population
Census	Pop.	Note	%±
1900	875		—
1910	823		−5.9%
1920	1,015		23.3%
1930	884		−12.9%
1940	974		10.2%
1950	1,094		12.3%
1960	952		−13.0%
1970	730		−23.3%
1980	756		3.6%
1990	840		11.1%
2000	682		−18.8%
2010	660		−3.2%
U.S. Decennial Census; 1899 (shown as 1900) 1910-1930; 1930-1950 1980-2000 2010

== See also ==
- List of communities in Puerto Rico
