= Santa Rosa, Utuado, Puerto Rico =

Barrio of Puerto Rico

Santa Rosa
- Barrio
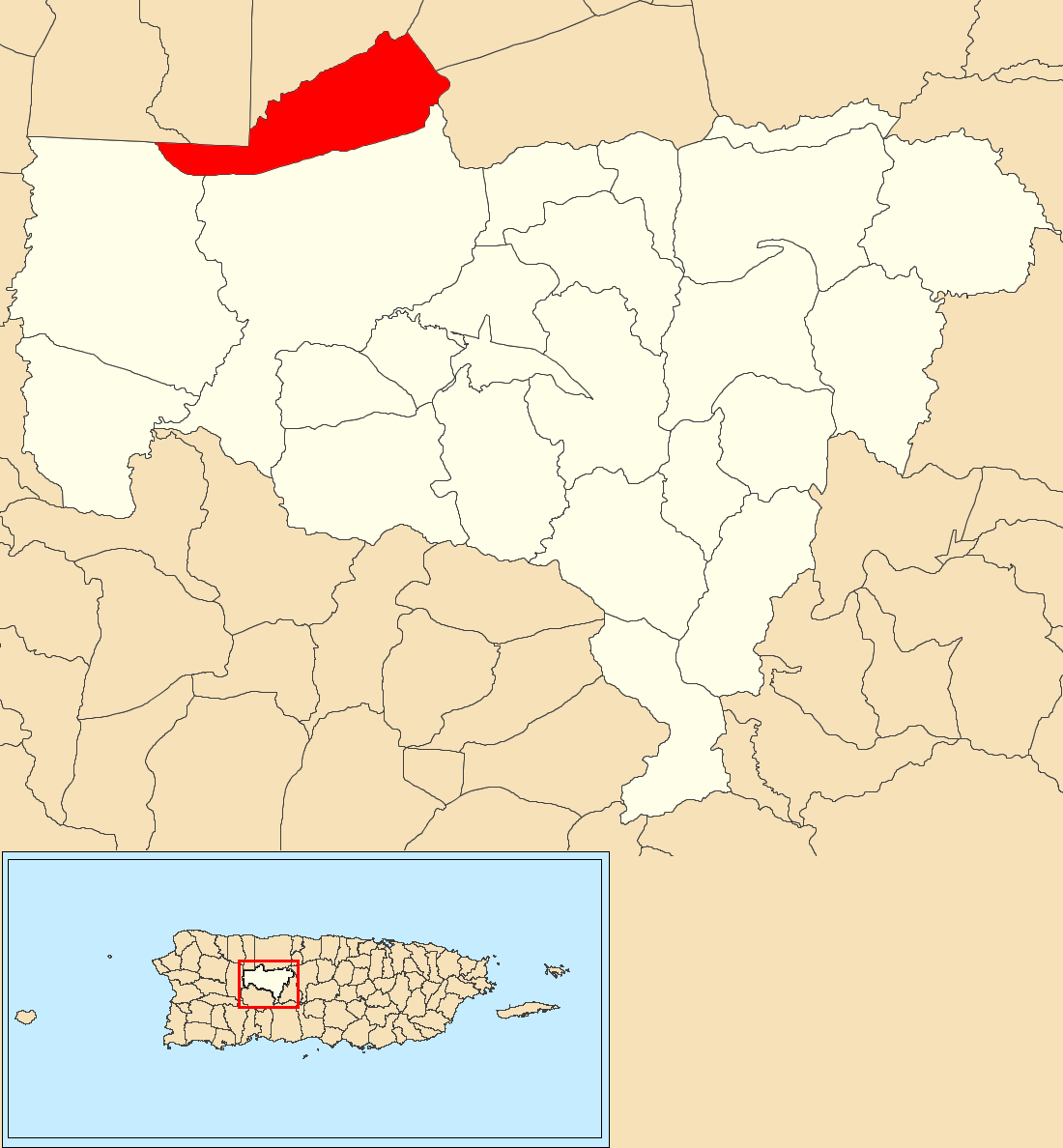
- Location of Santa Rosa within the municipality of Utuado shown in red

- Location of Puerto Rico
- Coordinates: 18°19′32″N 66°45′22″W
- Commonwealth: Puerto Rico
- Municipality: Utuado

Area
  - Total: 5.04 sq mi (13.1 km^{2})
  - Land: 5.04 sq mi (13.1 km^{2})
  - Water: 0 sq mi (0 km^{2})
- Elevation: 1,132 ft (345 m)

Population (2010)
  - Total: 0
  - Density: 0/sq mi (0/km^{2})
- Source: 2010 Census
- Time zone: UTC−4 (AST)

Santa Rosa is a barrio in the municipality of Utuado, Puerto Rico. Its population in 2010 was 0.

== Geography ==
Santa Rosa is situated at an elevation of 1,132 feet (345 m) north of Caguana in Utuado, Puerto Rico. It has an area of 5.04 square miles (13.1 km^{2}).

== History ==
Santa Rosa was in Spain's gazetteers until Puerto Rico was ceded by Spain in the aftermath of the Spanish–American War under the terms of the Treaty of Paris of 1898 and became an unincorporated territory of the United States. In 1899, the United States Department of War conducted a census of Puerto Rico finding that the population of Santa Rosa barrio was 793.

Historical population
Census	Pop.	Note	%±
1900	793		—
1910	620		−21.8%
1920	801		29.2%
1930	815		1.7%
1940	916		12.4%
1950	583		−36.4%
1960	231		−60.4%
1970	49		−78.8%
1980	8		−83.7%
1990	5		−37.5%
2000	0		−100.0%
2010	0		—
U.S. Decennial Census; 1899 (shown as 1900) 1910-1930; 1930-1950 1980-2000 2010

== See also ==
- List of communities in Puerto Rico
