= Sabana Grande, Utuado, Puerto Rico =

Barrio of Puerto Rico

Sabana Grande
- Barrio
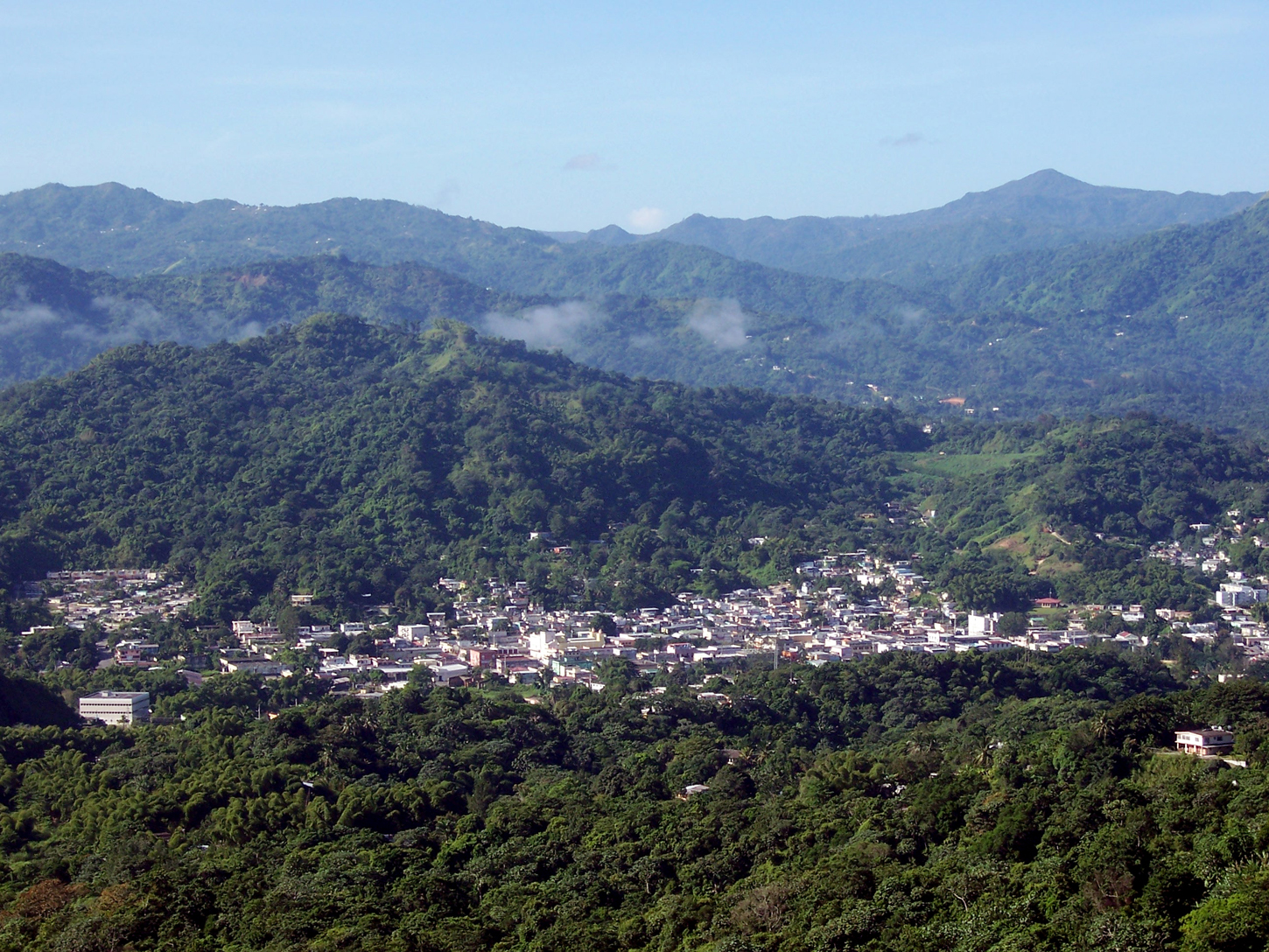
- View of Utuado Pueblo from Sabana Grande

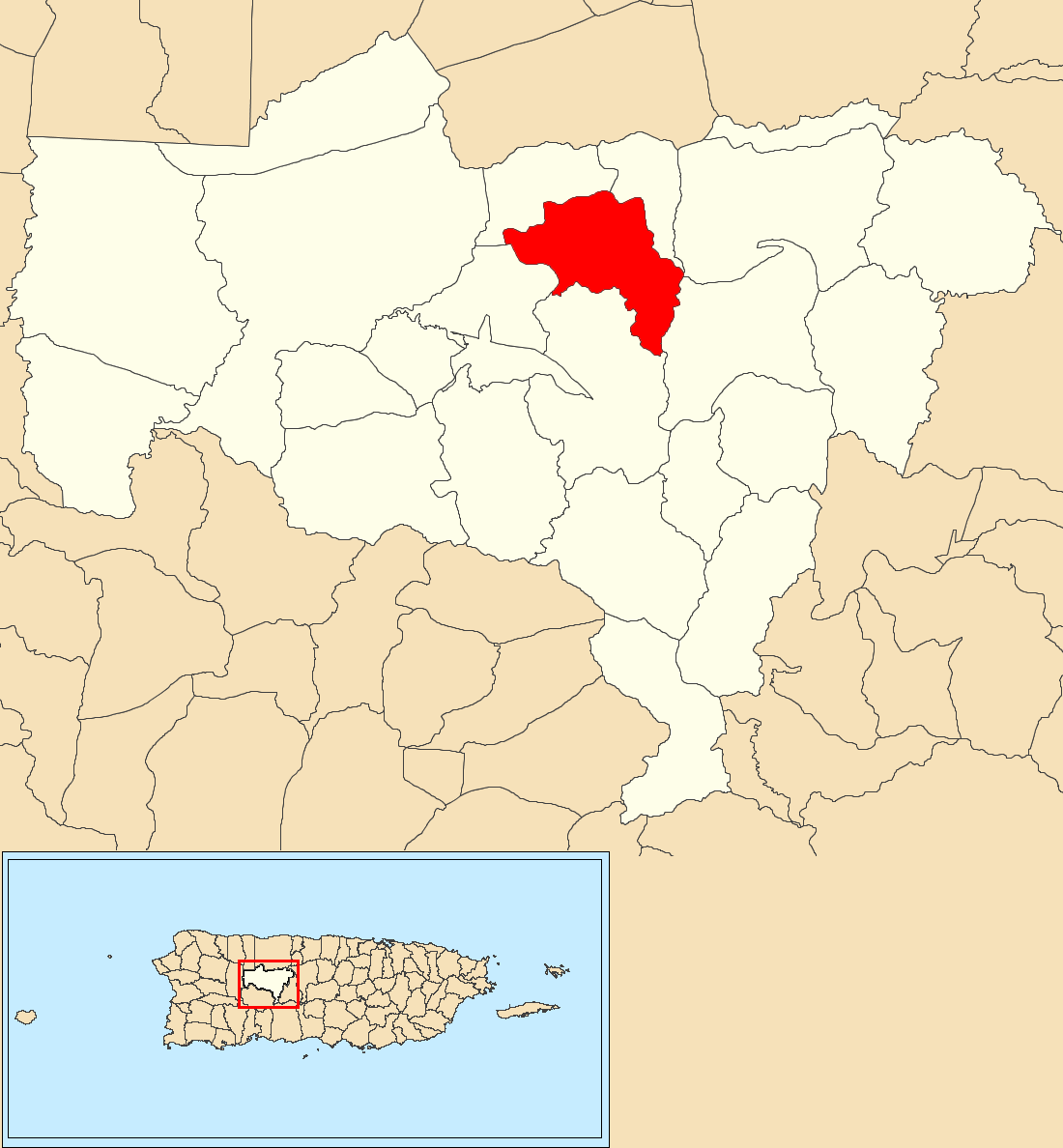
- Location of Sabana Grande within the municipality of Utuado shown in red

- Location of Puerto Rico
- Coordinates: 18°17′39″N 66°40′44″W
- Commonwealth: Puerto Rico
- Municipality: Utuado

Area
  - Total: 3.92 sq mi (10.2 km^{2})
  - Land: 3.88 sq mi (10.0 km^{2})
  - Water: 0.04 sq mi (0.10 km^{2})
- Elevation: 1,335 ft (407 m)

Population (2010)
  - Total: 1,112
  - Density: 286.6/sq mi (110.7/km^{2})
- Source: 2010 Census
- Time zone: UTC−4 (AST)

Sabana Grande is a barrio in the municipality of Utuado, Puerto Rico. Its population in 2010 was 1,112.

== History ==
Sabana Grande was in Spain's gazetteers until Puerto Rico was ceded by Spain in the aftermath of the Spanish–American War under the terms of the Treaty of Paris of 1898 and became an unincorporated territory of the United States. In 1899, the United States Department of War conducted a census of Puerto Rico finding that the population of Sabana Grande barrio was 1,053.

Historical population
Census	Pop.	Note	%±
1900	1,053		—
1910	875		−16.9%
1920	1,032		17.9%
1930	945		−8.4%
1940	1,127		19.3%
1950	1,228		9.0%
1960	906		−26.2%
1970	874		−3.5%
1980	671		−23.2%
1990	880		31.1%
2000	985		11.9%
2010	1,112		12.9%
U.S. Decennial Census; 1899 (shown as 1900) 1910-1930; 1930-1950 1980-2000 2010

== See also ==
- List of communities in Puerto Rico
