= Limón, Utuado, Puerto Rico =

Barrio of Puerto Rico

Limón
- Barrio
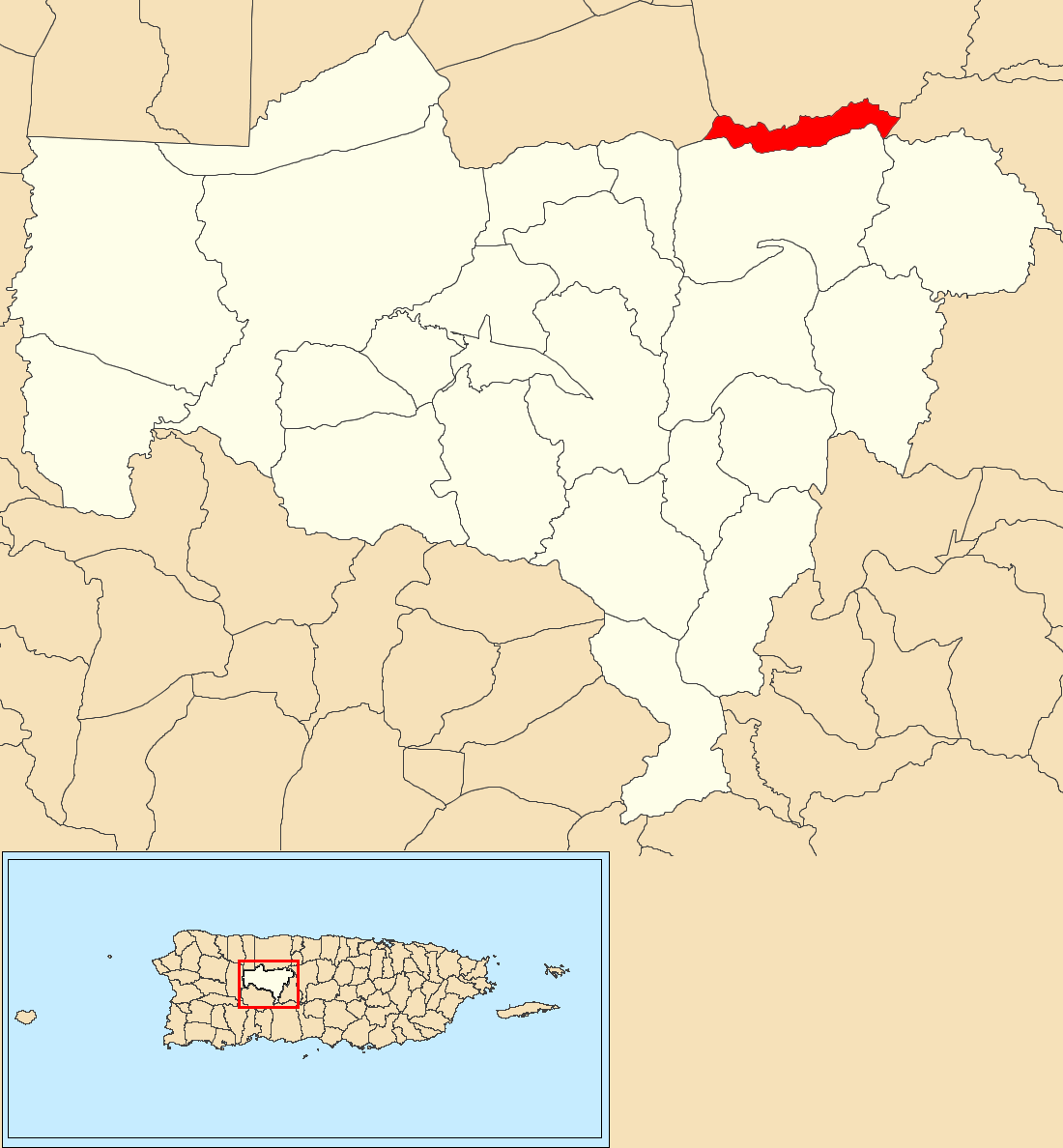
- Location of Limón within the municipality of Utuado shown in red

- Location of Puerto Rico
- Coordinates: 18°19′31″N 66°37′58″W
- Commonwealth: Puerto Rico
- Municipality: Utuado

Area
  - Total: 1.26 sq mi (3.3 km^{2})
  - Land: 1.22 sq mi (3.2 km^{2})
  - Water: 0.04 sq mi (0.10 km^{2})
- Elevation: 837 ft (255 m)

Population (2010)
  - Total: 227
  - Density: 186.1/sq mi (71.9/km^{2})
- Source: 2010 Census
- Time zone: UTC−4 (AST)

Limón is a barrio in the municipality of Utuado, Puerto Rico. Its population in 2010 was 227.

== History ==
Limón was in Spain's gazetteers until Puerto Rico was ceded by Spain in the aftermath of the Spanish–American War under the terms of the Treaty of Paris of 1898 and became an unincorporated territory of the United States. In 1899, the United States Department of War conducted a census of Puerto Rico finding that the population of Limón barrio was 857.

Historical population
Census	Pop.	Note	%±
1900	857		—
1910	968		13.0%
1920	960		−0.8%
1930	847		−11.8%
1940	980		15.7%
1950	470		−52.0%
1960	341		−27.4%
1970	299		−12.3%
1980	266		−11.0%
1990	193		−27.4%
2000	223		15.5%
2010	227		1.8%
U.S. Decennial Census; 1899 (shown as 1900) 1910-1930; 1930-1950 1980-2000 2010

== See also ==
- List of communities in Puerto Rico
