= Viví River =

River of Puerto Rico

- Native name: Río Viví (Spanish)

Location
- Commonwealth: Puerto Rico
- Municipality: Utuado

Physical characteristics
- Source: Adjuntas, Puerto Rico
  - coordinates: 18.2671761°N 66.7082298°W
- Mouth
  - location: Utuado, Puerto Rico
  - elevation: 420 ft

The Viví River (Spanish: Río Viví) is a river in Puerto Rico that runs through the town of Utuado and Adjuntas, Puerto Rico. It is about 11 miles long.

The town was to begin work on a bridge that goes over the Viví River in 2019, since its destruction on September 20, 2017 by Hurricane Maria.

== See also ==
- List of rivers of Puerto Rico
