= Caníaco, Utuado, Puerto Rico =

Barrio of Puerto Rico

Caníaco
- Barrio
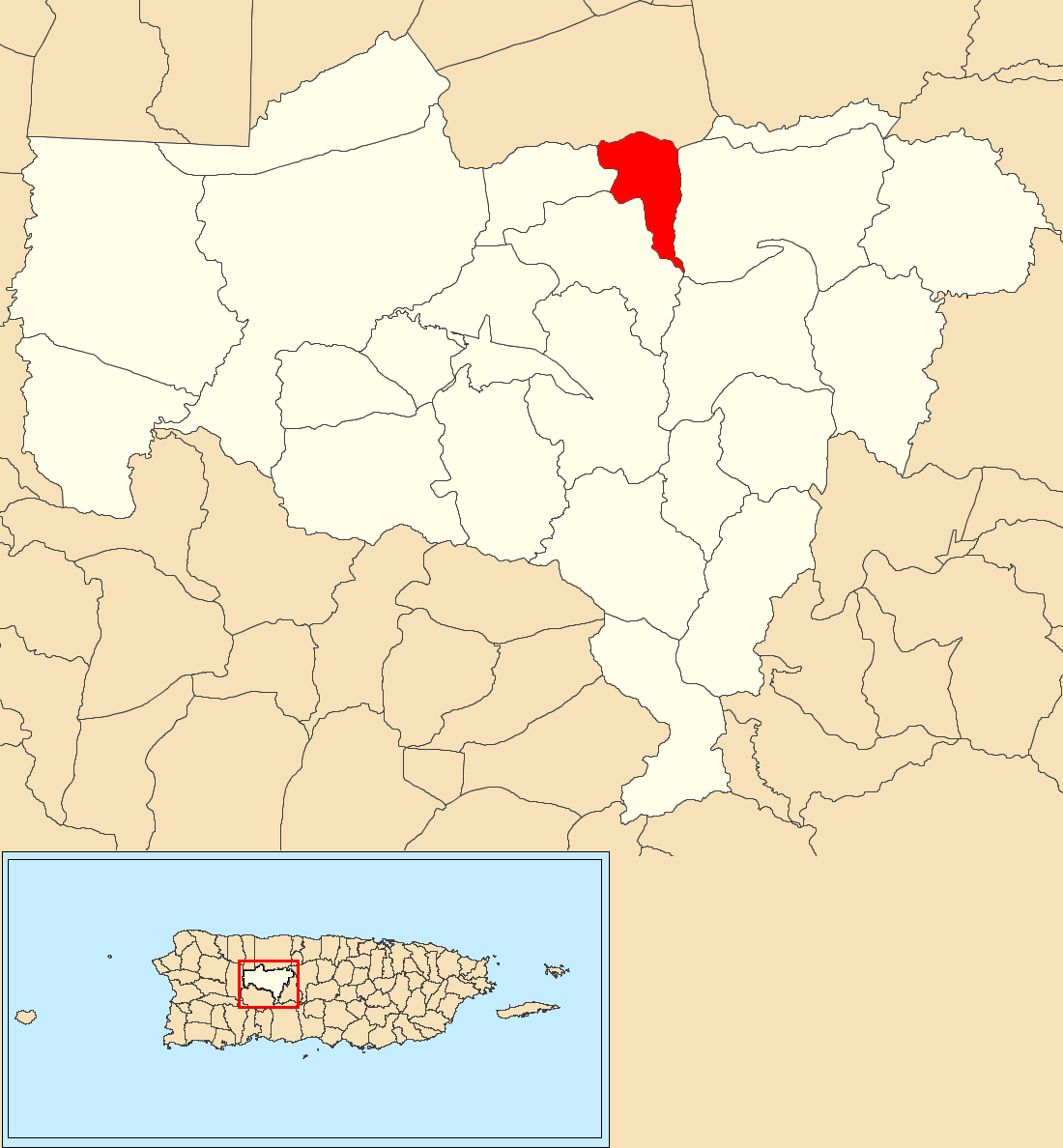
- Location of Caníaco within the municipality of Utuado shown in red

- Location of Puerto Rico
- Coordinates: 18°19′02″N 66°40′22″W
- Commonwealth: Puerto Rico
- Municipality: Utuado

Area
  - Total: 1.71 sq mi (4.4 km^{2})
  - Land: 1.50 sq mi (3.9 km^{2})
  - Water: 0.21 sq mi (0.54 km^{2})
- Elevation: 292 ft (89 m)

Population (2010)
  - Total: 198
  - Density: 132/sq mi (51/km^{2})
- Source: 2010 Census
- Time zone: UTC−4 (AST)

Caníaco is a barrio in the municipality of Utuado, Puerto Rico. Its population in 2010 was 198.

== History ==
Caníaco was in Spain's gazetteers until Puerto Rico was ceded by Spain in the aftermath of the Spanish–American War under the terms of the Treaty of Paris of 1898 and became an unincorporated territory of the United States. In 1899, the United States Department of War conducted a census of Puerto Rico finding that the population of Caníaco barrio was 631.

Historical population
| Census | Pop. | Note | %± |
|---|---|---|---|
| 1900 | 631 | | — |
| 1910 | 568 | | −10.0% |
| 1920 | 668 | | 17.6% |
| 1930 | 660 | | −1.2% |
| 1940 | 656 | | −0.6% |
| 1950 | 508 | | −22.6% |
| 1960 | 550 | | 8.3% |
| 1970 | 312 | | −43.3% |
| 1980 | 244 | | −21.8% |
| 1990 | 203 | | −16.8% |
| 2000 | 155 | | −23.6% |
| 2010 | 198 | | 27.7% |
U.S. Decennial Census; 1899 (shown as 1900) 1910-1930; 1930-1950 1980-2000 2010

== See also ==
- List of communities in Puerto Rico
