= Don Alonso =

Barrio of Utuado, Puerto Rico

- Barrio
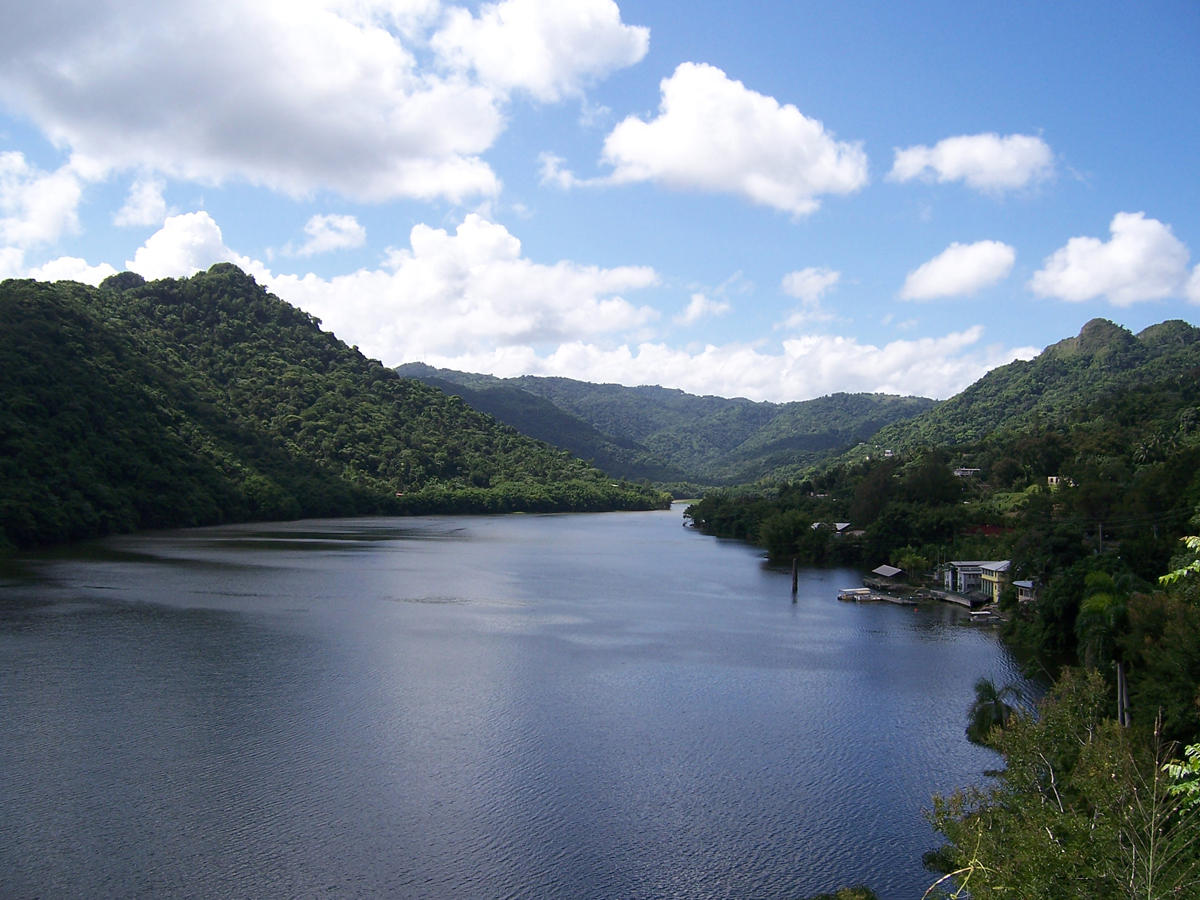
- Dos Bocas Lake

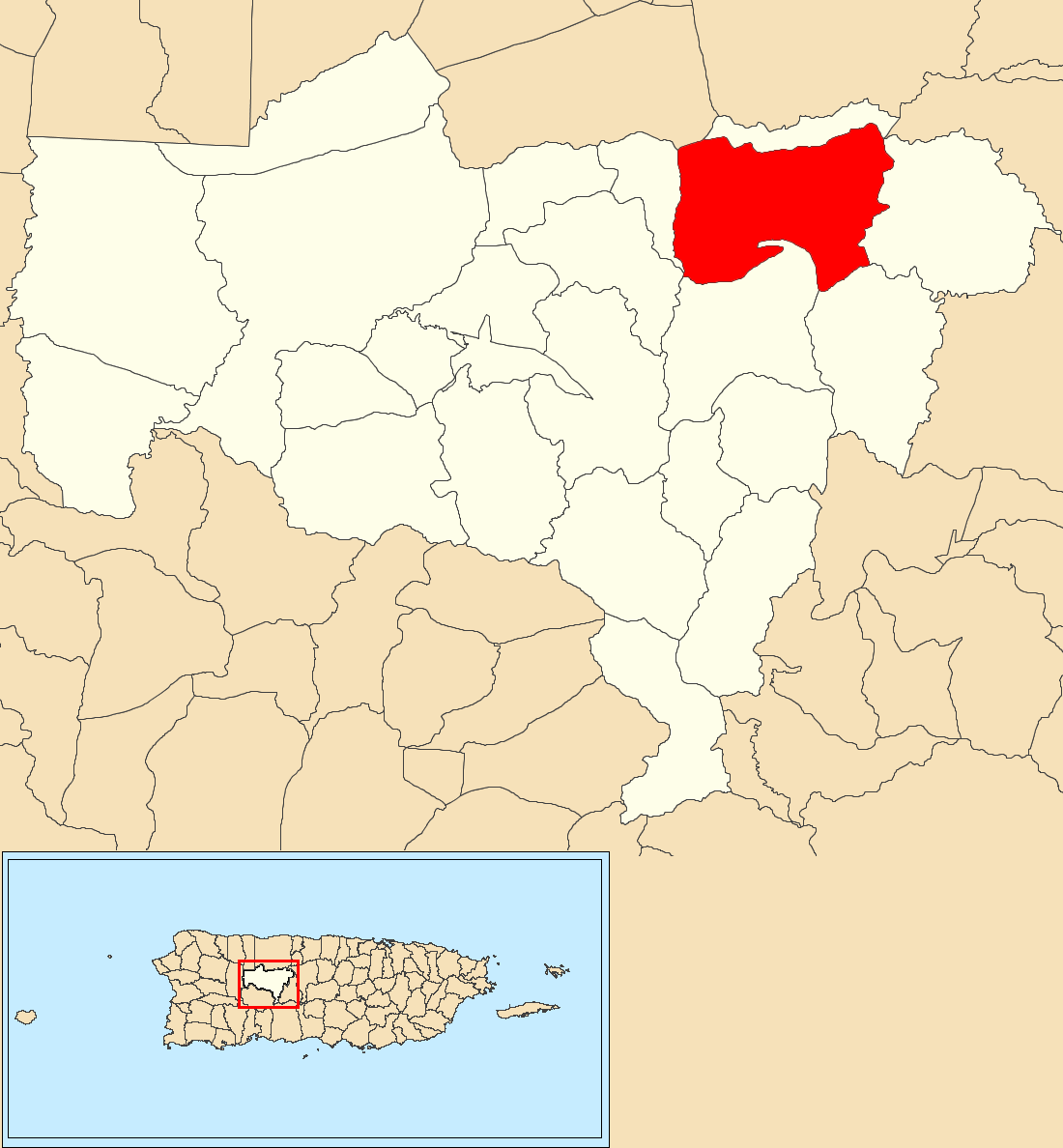
- Location of Don Alonso within the municipality of Utuado shown in red

- Location of Puerto Rico
- Coordinates: 18°18′31″N 66°38′16″W
- Commonwealth: Puerto Rico
- Municipality: Utuado

Area
  - Total: 7.24 sq mi (18.8 km^{2})
  - Land: 7.03 sq mi (18.2 km^{2})
  - Water: 0.21 sq mi (0.54 km^{2})
- Elevation: 1,152 ft (351 m)

Population (2010)
  - Total: 900
  - Density: 128/sq mi (49/km^{2})
- Source: 2010 Census
- Time zone: UTC−4 (AST)

Don Alonso is a barrio in the municipality of Utuado, Puerto Rico. Its population in 2010 was 900.

== History ==
Don Alonso was in Spain's gazetteers until Puerto Rico was ceded by Spain in the aftermath of the Spanish–American War under the terms of the Treaty of Paris of 1898 and became an unincorporated territory of the United States. In 1899, the United States Department of War conducted a census of Puerto Rico finding that the population of Don Alonso barrio was 1,610.

Historical population
Census	Pop.	Note	%±
1900	1,610		—
1910	1,733		7.6%
1920	2,106		21.5%
1930	2,164		2.8%
1940	1,972		−8.9%
1950	2,227		12.9%
1960	1,676		−24.7%
1970	1,222		−27.1%
1980	1,187		−2.9%
1990	911		−23.3%
2000	897		−1.5%
2010	900		0.3%
U.S. Decennial Census; 1899 (shown as 1900) 1910-1930; 1930-1950 1980-2000 2010

== Gallery ==
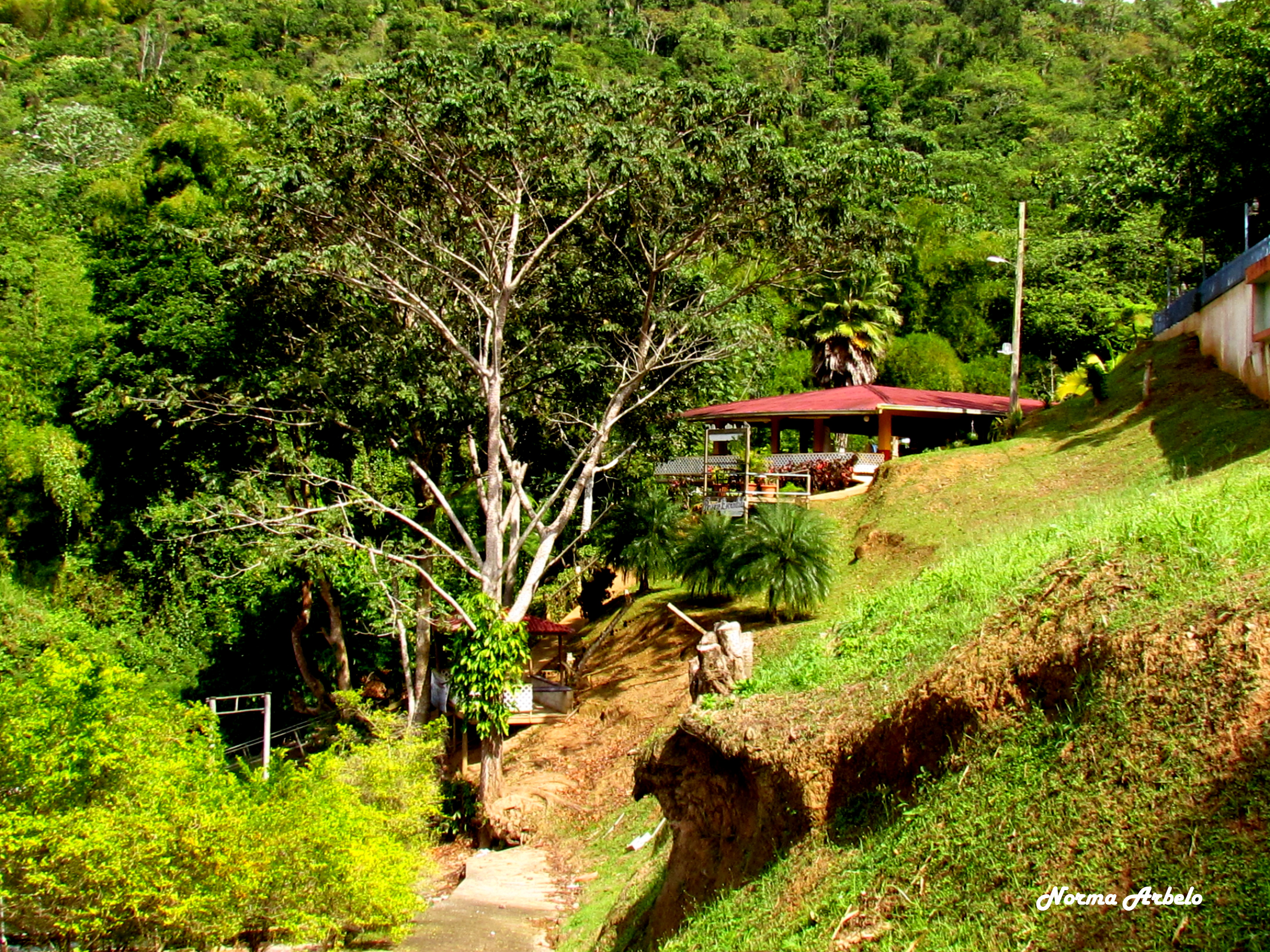
Gazebos near Dos Bocas Lake

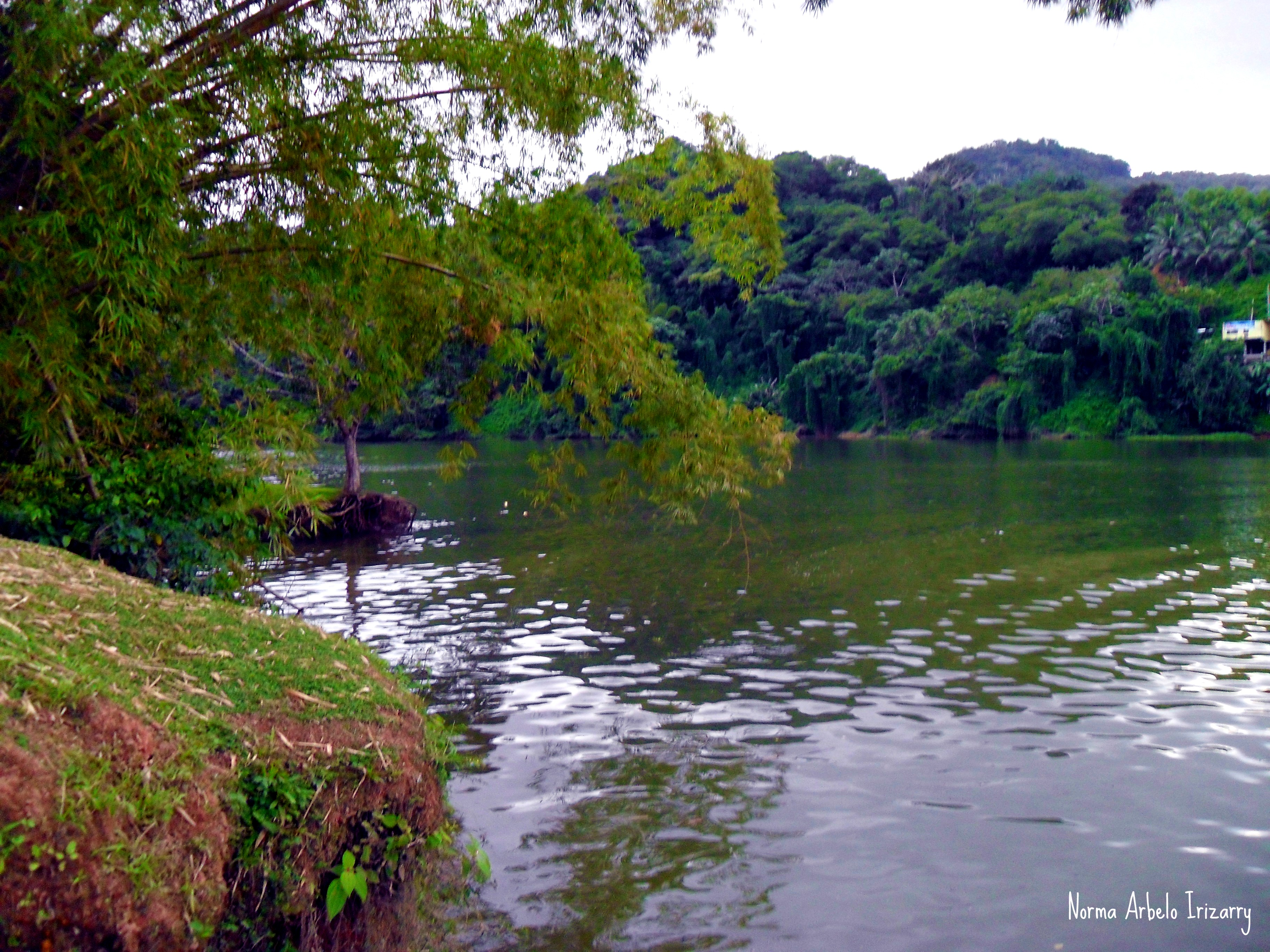
The Dos Bocas Lake in Don Alonso

== See also ==
- List of communities in Puerto Rico
