= Cordillera Central (Puerto Rico) =

Main mountain range in Puerto Rico

- Cordillera Central from the central municipality of Orocovis Cordillera Central from the south-central municipality of Juana Díaz

Highest point
- Peak: Cerro de Punta
- Elevation: 4,390 ft (1,340 m)
- Coordinates: 18°10′21″N 66°35′31″W

Geography
- Location within Puerto Rico
- Location: Puerto Rico
- Region: Caribbean

The Cordillera Central (English: "Central Mountain Range") is the only mountain range in the main island of Puerto Rico, consisting of three subranges: the western-central Cordillera Central, the southeastern Sierra de Cayey, and the northeastern Sierra de Luquillo. Bordered by the Northern Karst Belt to the northwest and costal plains to the north and south, the numerous ridges and foothills of the three subranges combined extend throughout the island. Concentrated in the western to central region of the island, the eponymous main subrange of Cordillera Central originates in the municipality of Mayagüez and merges with the Sierra de Cayey subrange on the town boundary between the municipalities of Barranquitas and Aibonito. At 1,338 meters (4,390 ft) on the town line between Ponce and Jayuya, Cerro de Punta is the summit of the Cordillera Central and the highest point in Puerto Rico.

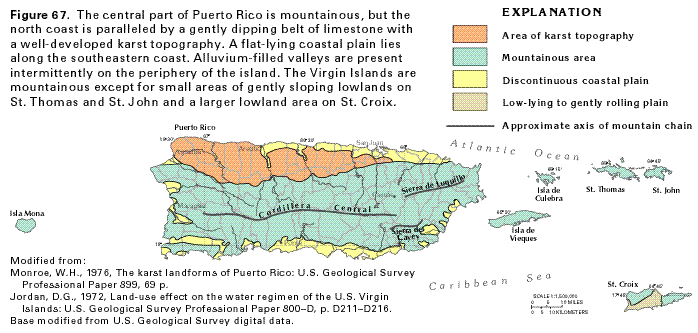
General physiographic map of Puerto Rico, with mountainous terrain in green, karst in orange, and plains in yellow

== History ==
The region of the Cordillera Central has been inhabited since the pre-Hispanic era. During the Spanish colonization of Puerto Rico, the Cordillera Central was likely shared by different Taíno cacicazgos or chiefdoms: Yagüecax, Otoao, Jatibonico, Guaynia and Turabon. Many of the indigenous Taínos fled to the central mountainous region during the Spanish conquest of Borinquen, and the region today hosts a number of related archaeological sites.

Throughout the history of Puerto Rico, this mountain range has been important for the economy of the island. Due to its climate, the range has been ideal for the cultivation of fruit, vegetables and, most famously, coffee. The coffee cultivation and production in the Cordillera Central intensified throughout the 19th century. This helped develop the mountainous region of the island and attracted a high influx of immigrants from coastal cities such as San Juan and Ponce, but also from Europe thanks to the Royal Decree of Graces of 1815 which encouraged non-Spanish Europeans to settle and cultivate the land. Coffee was one of the most lucrative industries of the region at the time, and it was developed particularly by Corsican immigrants.

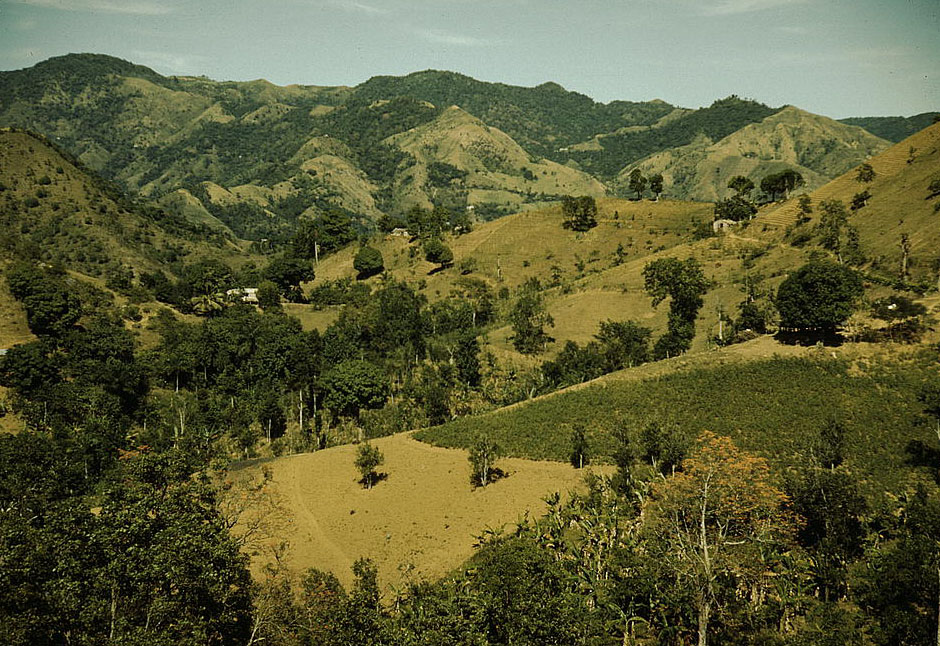
Cordillera Central in Corozal, 1941

The first paved road to span the mountain range was the Carretera Central, which was functional by 1886 and completed in 1898, connecting San Juan in the Atlantic coast to Ponce in the Caribbean coast. Many of the workers involved in its construction were confined Chinese workers from Cuba between the years 1865 and 1880. The original road goes through the municipalities of San Juan (formerly the municipality of Río Piedras), Guaynabo, Caguas, Cidra, Cayey, Aibonito, Coamo, Juana Díaz and Ponce. This was the most important engineering project built by the Spanish government in Puerto Rico during the 19th century and it highly influenced the human development of the region. The original route is now listed in the US National Register of Historic Places. This road is also known as the Military Road (Spanish: Carretera Militar) for its strategic importance and it was used both by the Spanish and US Army during the Puerto Rico campaign of the Spanish-American War of 1898.

== Geography ==
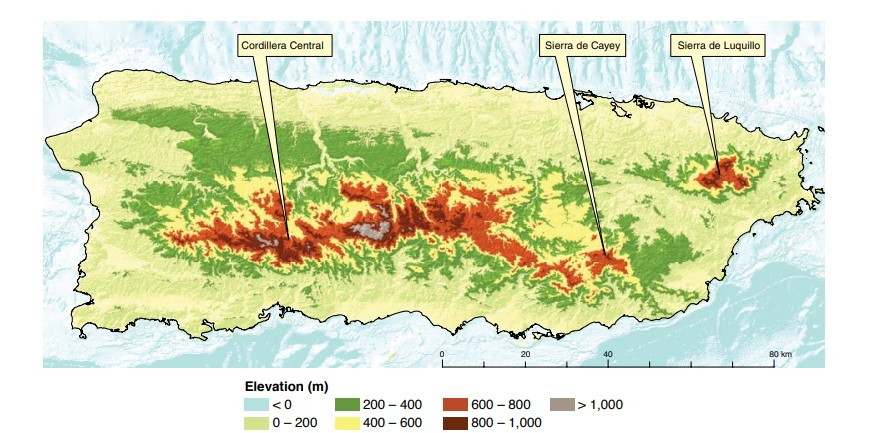
Topographic map of Puerto Rico showing the Cordillera Central and its two major subranges

The Puerto Rico Central Mountain Range or Cordillera Central is considered the largest of the three geographical and physiographic provinces of the island, along with the Karst regions and the coastal plains. The mountain range begins in the western part of the island in the municipalities of Mayagüez, Maricao, and Las Marías close to the Mona Passage in the west coast of Puerto Rico.

Another western portion of the range that is sometimes included in the Cordillera Central, called the Santa Marta Hills, is located to the southwest in the municipalities of Sabana Grande, San Germán, Lajas and Cabo Rojo. This subrange forms the division between the Lajas Valley and the Guanajibo or Sabana Grande Valley, and it connects to the main range of the Cordillera Central in the border between Yauco and Sabana Grande.

The Cordillera Central proper keeps eastward through the municipalities of Maricao, Lares, Utuado, Yauco, Adjuntas, Guayanilla, Peñuelas, Ponce, Jayuya, Juana Díaz, Villalba, Ciales, Orocovis, Corozal, Barranquitas, Coamo, Comerío and Aibonito; this section contains the highest peaks of the range and Puerto Rico, such as Cerro de Punta which is the highest point in the island.

The Aibonito Pass (also known as Asomante Pass) to the immediate south of San Cristóbal Cayon creates a division between the Cordillera Central proper and its eastward subrange, the Sierra de Cayey, which crosses Cayey, Salinas, Guayama, Caguas, San Lorenzo and Patillas.

From this point the range splits in two ridges (often called cuchillas in Spanish): the Sierra de Guardarraya between Patillas and Maunabo in the north, and the Sierra Pandura between Maunabo and Yabucoa in the south; these two small ranges end in the southeastern coast of Puerto Rico next to the Caribbean Sea, forming the plains of the Valley of Maunabo between them.

The Sierra de Luquillo, which crosses Gurabo, Carolina, Juncos, Canóvanas, Las Piedras, Rio Grande, Luquillo, Naguabo, Fajardo, and Ceiba, is often included as a subrange of the Cordillera Central, however it is separated from it by the Loíza hydrological basin in the Caguas Valley and numerous other geographical features such as the San Lorenzo batholith.

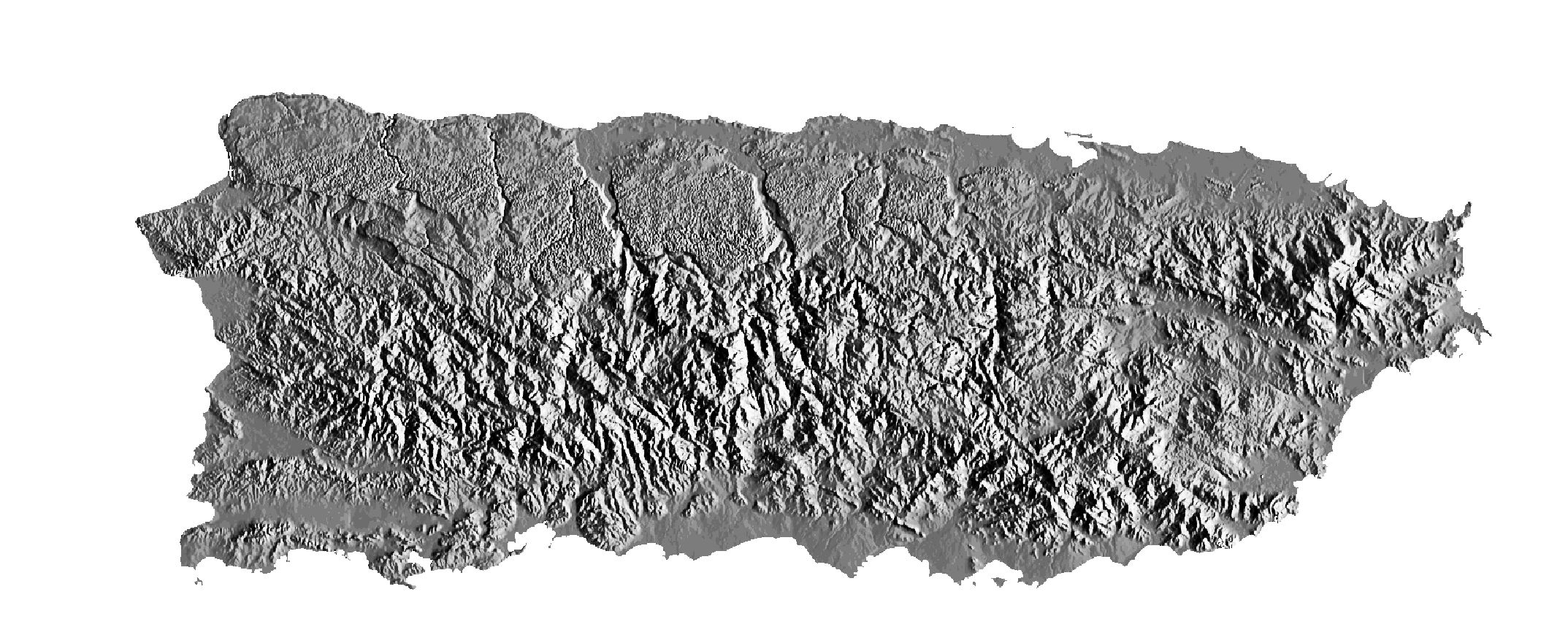
Relief map with the Cordillera Central

== Geology ==
The northern edge of the Cordillera Central was formed throughout millions of years through the interactions between the North American and Caribbean plate tectonics. The relief was shaped by an accordion-like motion between both plate tectonics through subduction and transform fault line collisions. In addition to the seismic orogeny, the central mountain ranges are also the product of volcanic activity from 120 million years ago in the Early Cretaceous period, and what is the Cordillera Central today used to be the tips of small islands surrounding larger volcanic islands.

Given its volcanic origin, most of the rocks are of Eocene, Paleocene and Cretaceous volcanic and sedimentary composition. There are also deposits of intrusive rock, composed of quartz diorite, diorite and granodiorite, in addition to alluvium in the central and northern regions, and metamorphic serpentine sedimentary and igneous rock in the western portion.

== Ecology ==
The Cordillera Central is home to most of the endemic plant and animal species in Puerto Rico. The majority of the range is home to Puerto Rican moist forests, belonging to both the tropical and subtropical moist broadleaf forest ecoregion of the Caribbean. This habitat style is often known as jungle (Spanish: selva) and it extends to other geographical provinces of the island such as the karst zones and the coastal lowlands.

=== Flora ===
The Cordillera Central is home to several types of forests such as the tropical montane forest, which includes the cloud and dwarf forests, and the subtropical moist forest. Trees at middle elevations tend to be the tallest while those closer to the mountain summits tend to be smaller. Some of the most common plant species are the West Indian treefern (Cyathea arborea), the trumpet tree (Cecropia peltata), the nemoca tree (Ocotea moschata), the West Indian sumac (Brunellia comocladifolia), the yucca plum pine (Podocarpus coriaceus), the candlewood or tabonuco tree (Dacryodes excelsa), the bulletwood (Manilkara bidentata), the Puerto Rican magnolia (Magnolia portoricensis), the maga tree (Thespesia grandiflora), and the Sierra palm tree (Prestoea montana). The foothills are home to plants such as the coroso palm tree (Acrocomia media) and the West Indian locust (Hymenaea courbaril). Most of the endangered species are also endemic, and they include species such as the Cordillera maiden fern (Amauropelta inabonensis), only found in Cerro Rosa, Cook's holly (Ilex cookii) which is only found in Cerro de Punta and Mount Jayuya, and the palo de ramon (Banara vanderbiltii) of which only 20 wild individuals remain. The Caribbean pine (Pinus caribaea) and the West Indian (Swietenia mahagoni) and Honduran mahogany trees (S. macrophylla) have been introduced and successfully adapted to the mountain forests.

=== Fauna ===
This region is home to a high number of endemic animal species, most of which are birds and amphibians. In addition to the common coqui (Eleutherodactylus coqui), the mountain forests are home to at least 10 other species of coqui (Eleutherodactylus sp.), some of which are endangered. Some reptile species found in the forest are the Puerto Rican ground lizard (Pholidoscelis exsul), the blind worm lizard (Amphisbaena caeca), the endangered Puerto Rican boa (Chilabothrus inornatus) and the Puerto Rican racer (Borikenophis portoricensis).

The Cordillera Central was recognized as an Important Bird Area by BirdLife International in 2007. The most common birds in the area are the Puerto Rican woodpecker (Melanerpes portoricensis), the Puerto Rican tody (Todus mexicanus), the Puerto Rican lizard cuckoo (Coccyzus vieilloti), the zenaida dove (Zenaida aurita), the Puerto Rican emerald hummingbird (Riccordia maugeaus) and the red-tailed hawk (Buteo jamaicensis). The Puerto Rican parrot (Amazona vittata) used to be very common in the region but it is now critically endangered; other endangered birds are the Puerto Rican broad-winged hawk, Bicknell's thrush and the Puerto Rican sharp-shinned hawk.

The rivers and streams that originate in the mountains are home to species such as the mountain mullet (Dajaus monticola) and the gata shrimp (Atya lanipes). There is also a number of bat species found throughout the region including the Antillean ghost-faced bat (Mormoops blainvillei), the greater bulldog bat (Noctilio leporinus) and the sooty mustached bat (Pteronotus quadridens). The invasive small Indian mongoose (Urva auropunctata) and black rat (Rattus rattus) are very common and considered a threat to many endangered native species.

=== Protected areas ===
The Central Mountain Range or Cordillera Central contains most of the protected state forests of Puerto Rico:

- Carite
- Cerrillos
- Guilarte
- Los Tres Picachos
- Maricao (Monte del Estado)
- Monte Choca
- Pueblo
- Susúa
- Toro Negro

== Climate ==
The Cordillera Central extends from west to east creating a geographic division between the north and the south of the island. The altitude of these mountains blocks the easterly trade winds and creates a rain shadow that cause the southern plains to have a drier and semi-arid weather than the more tropical humid weather found in the northern part of the island. The Cordillera is the rainiest region of Puerto Rico outside the Sierra de Luquillo. The rainiest periods are between the months of May and December, correlating with the wet season (often used interchangeably with hurricane season), with the months between December and March being relatively the driest.

Some of the lowest temperatures in Puerto Rico have been recorded in mountain towns and municipalities located on or along the Cordillera Central. The lowest temperature ever recorded was of 38 °F (3 °C) in the eastern portion of the range at Aibonito in March 1911, followed by 40 °F (4 °C) in the central portion of the range at Adjuntas in 1966 and 1993. Based on the current global climate patterns it is impossible for it to snow in the Cordillera Central or anywhere else in Puerto Rico.

== Peaks ==
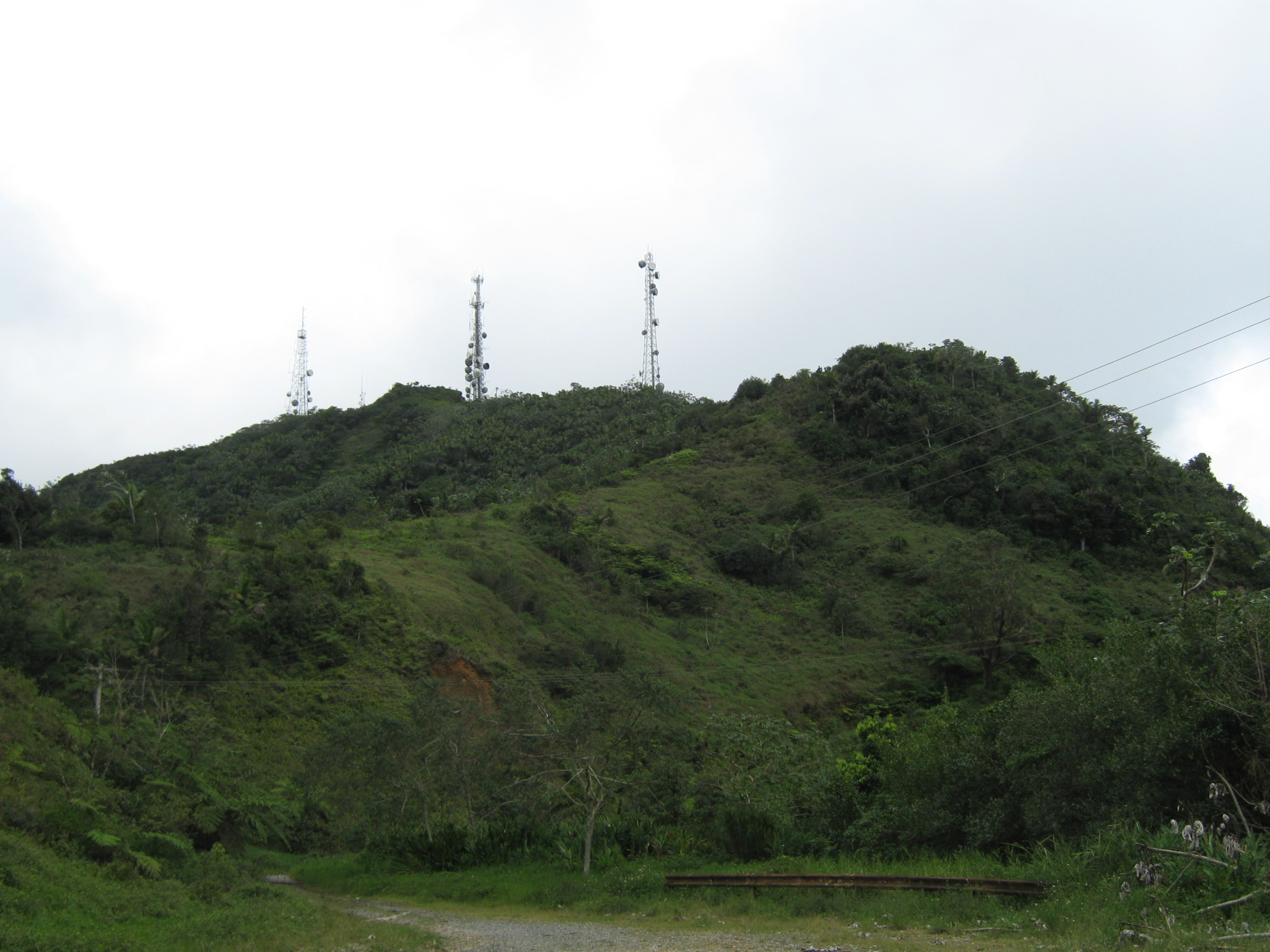
Cerro de Punta in Ponce, the highest peak in the Cordillera Central

The following table lists the 50 highest mountain peaks of Puerto Rico that are located in the Cordillera Central, including those of the Sierra de Cayey. Note that some unnamed peaks in the region are not included.

50 Highest mountain peaks in the Cordillera Central
Rank	Mountain Peak	Municipality and (Barrio)	Location Reference	Elevation	Elevation Reference
1	Cerro de Punta	Ponce (Anón)		4,357 ft (1,328 m)	
2	Monte Jayuya	Jayuya (Saliente), Ponce (Anón)		4,252 ft (1,296 m)	
3	Cerro Rosa	Ciales (Toro Negro), Jayuya (Saliente)		4,144 ft (1,263 m)	
4	Piedra Blanca	Jayuya (Veguitas)		4,042 ft (1,232 m)	
5	Cerro Maravilla	Ponce (Anón)		3,960 ft (1,207 m)	
6	Monte Guilarte	Adjuntas (Guilarte)		3,934 ft (1,199 m)	
7	Los Tres Picachos	Ciales (Toro Negro), Jayuya (Coabey)		3,894 ft (1,187 m)	
8	Cerro Saliente	Jayuya (Saliente)		3,845 ft (1,172 m)	
9	Monte Membrillo	Yauco (Río Prieto)		3,579 ft (1,091 m)	
10	Cerro El Bolo	Orocovis (Ala de la Piedra), Villalba (Villalba Arriba)		3,527 ft (1,075 m)	
11	Cerro Doña Juana	Orocovis (Ala de la Piedra)		3,471 ft (1,058 m)	
12	Cerro Vaquiña	Adjuntas (Guilarte)		3,369 ft (1,027 m)	
13	Cerro Garrote	Peñuelas (Rucio)		3,356 ft (1,023 m)	
14	Cerrote de Peñuelas	Peñuelas (Rucio)		3,307 ft (1,008 m)	
15	Cerro El Gigante	Adjuntas (Saltillo)		3,175 ft (968 m)	
16	Cerro Morales	Jayuya (Jayuya Abajo), Utuado (Tetuán)		3,126 ft (953 m)	
17	Las Tres Palmas	Jayuya (Coabey)		3,106 ft (947 m)	
18	La Torrecilla	Barranquitas (Barrancas)		3,057 ft (932 m)	
19	Cerro Roncador	Utuado (Guaonico)		3,038 ft (926 m)	
20	Peña La Francia	Orocovis (Bauta Abajo)		3,028 ft (923 m)	
21	Cerro Prieto	Utuado (Viví Arriba)		3,021 ft (921 m)	
22	Cerro El Malo	Orocovis (Bermejales)		3,005 ft (916 m)	
23	Cerro Taita	Orocovis (Bauta Abajo)		2,985 ft (910 m)	
24	Cerro Novillo	Adjuntas (Portillo)		2,952 ft (900 m)	
25	Cerro La Santa	Caguas (San Salvador), Cayey (Farallón), San Lorenzo (Espino)		2,903 ft (885 m)	
26	Cerro Palo de Café	Jayuya (Mameyes Arriba)		2,896 ft (883 m)	
27	Cerro El Peligro	Guayanilla (Jagua Pasto, Quebrada Honda), Peñuelas (Macaná)		2,890 ft (880 m)	
28	Cerro Lloroso	Adjuntas (Tanamá, Yayales)		2,883 ft (879 m)	
29	Pico Rodadero	Yauco (Aguas Blancas, Duey, Sierra Alta)		2,864 ft (873 m)	
30	Cerro Pío	Orocovis (Damián Arriba, Saltos)		2,841 ft (866 m)	
31	Cerro Lucero	Caguas (San Salvador), Cayey (Farallón)		2,831 ft (863 m)	
32	Monte Hormiga	Adjuntas (Capáez)		2,831 ft (863 m)	
33	Cerro Medina	Adjuntas (Tanamá, Yayales)		2,824 ft (861 m)	
34	Cerro de La Tabla	Cayey (Jájome Alto), Guayama (Carite, Guamaní)		2,808 ft (856 m)	
35	Cerro Honoré	Patillas (Muñoz Rivera), San Lorenzo (Espino)		2,795 ft (852 m)	
36	Cerro Avispa	Cayey (Cercadillo)		2,778 ft (847 m)	
37	Cerro Magoyo	Jayuya (Mameyes Arriba)		2,762 ft (842 m)	
38	Cerro Las Tetas	Salinas (Lapa)		2,759 ft (841 m)	
39	Cerro La Chorrera	Adjuntas (Capáez), Utuado (Guaonico)		2,739 ft (835 m)	
40	Cerro Pulguillas	Coamo (Pulguillas)		2,739 ft (835 m)	
41	Cerro Curet	Yauco (Aguas Blancas)		2,690 ft (820 m)	
42	Cerro Mata de Plátano	Peñuelas (Jaguas)		2,673 ft (815 m)	
43	Monte El Gato	Cayey (Sumido)		2,673 ft (815 m)	
44	Cerro Garzas	Adjuntas (Garzas)		2,641 ft (805 m)	
45	Peña Domingo	Cayey (Pasto Viejo, Piedras)		2,637 ft (804 m)	
46	Cerro Don Quiño	Adjuntas (Yahuecas, Yayales)		2,621 ft (799 m)	
47	Cerro El Pico	Coamo (Pulguillas)		2,598 ft (792 m)	
48	Peñon de los Soldados	Cayey (Cercadillo), Salinas (Palmas)		2,552 ft (778 m)	
49	Cerro Mercado	Adjuntas (Portillo, Yahuecas)		2,532 ft (772 m)	
50	Cerro Farallón	Barranquitas (Quebradillas)		2,552 ft (778 m)	

== Gallery ==
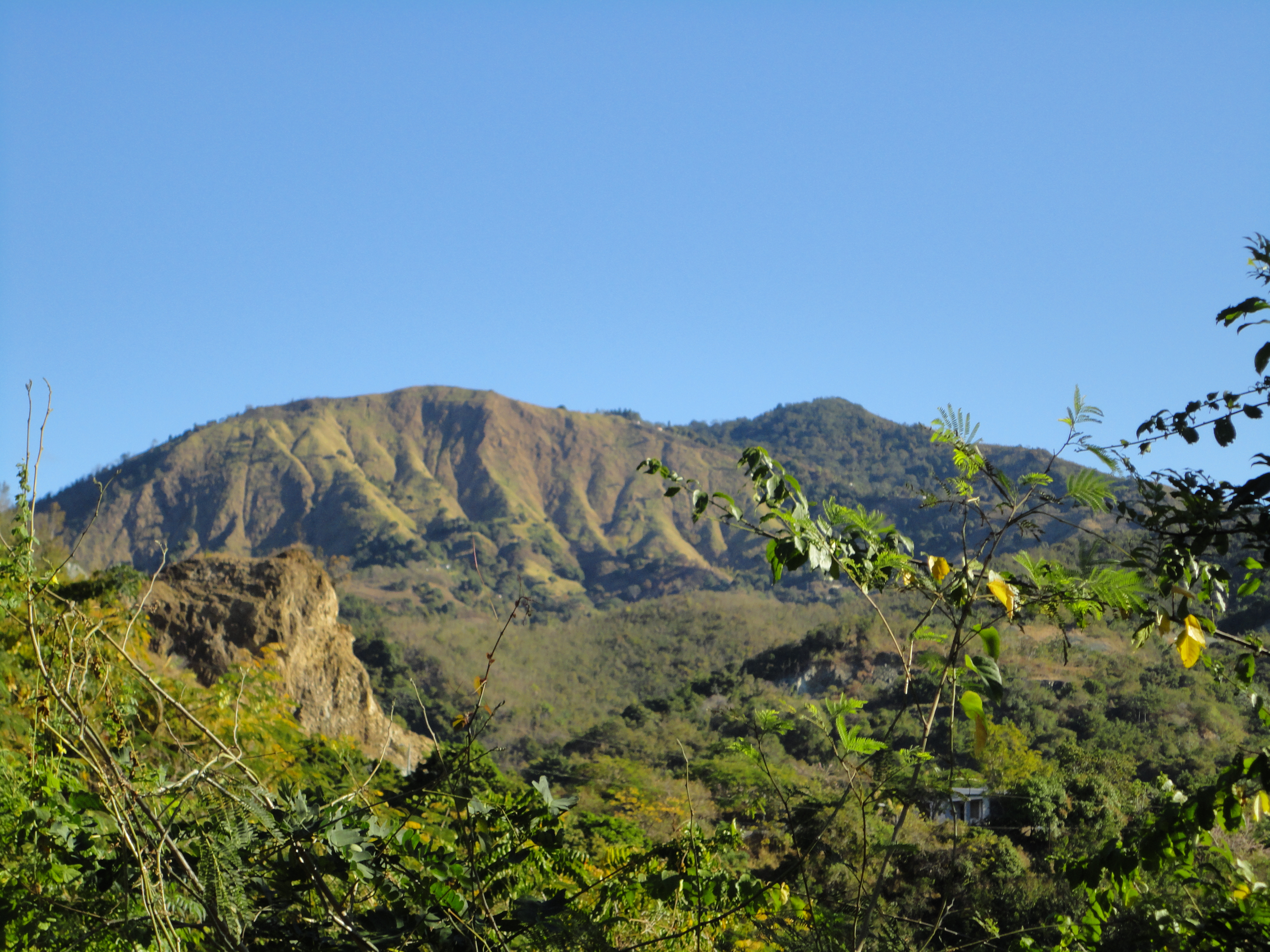
Cordillera Central and tabonuco forest in Sabana Grande.

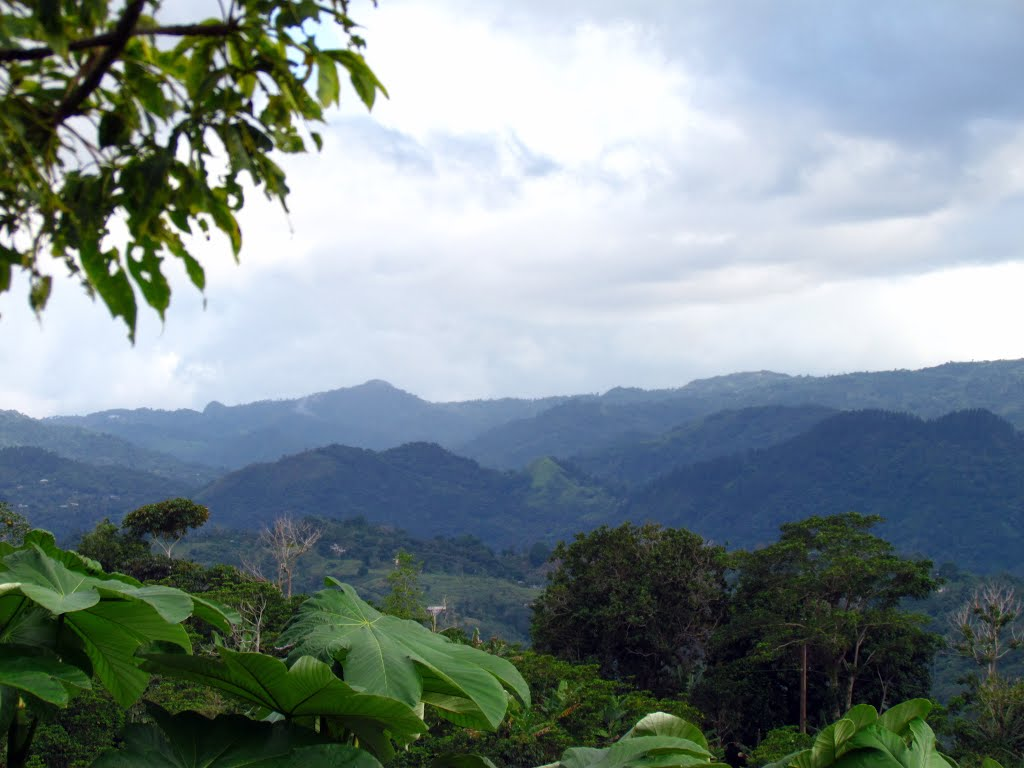
View of the Cordillera from the north in Piletas, Lares.

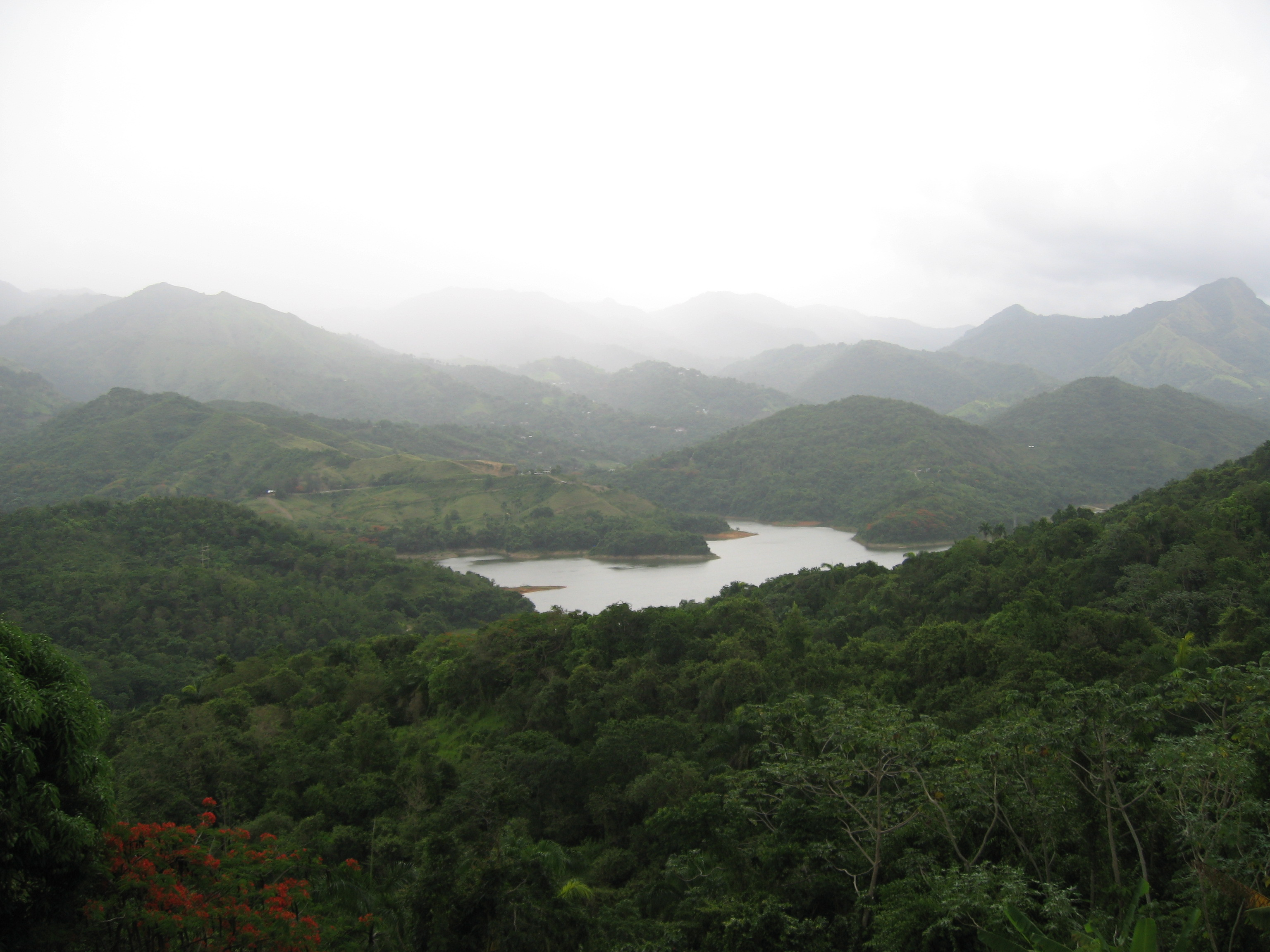
Yauco Lake reservoir.

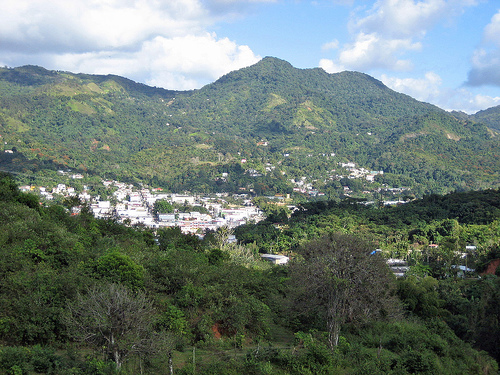
Adjuntas Pueblo and El Gigante Dormido.

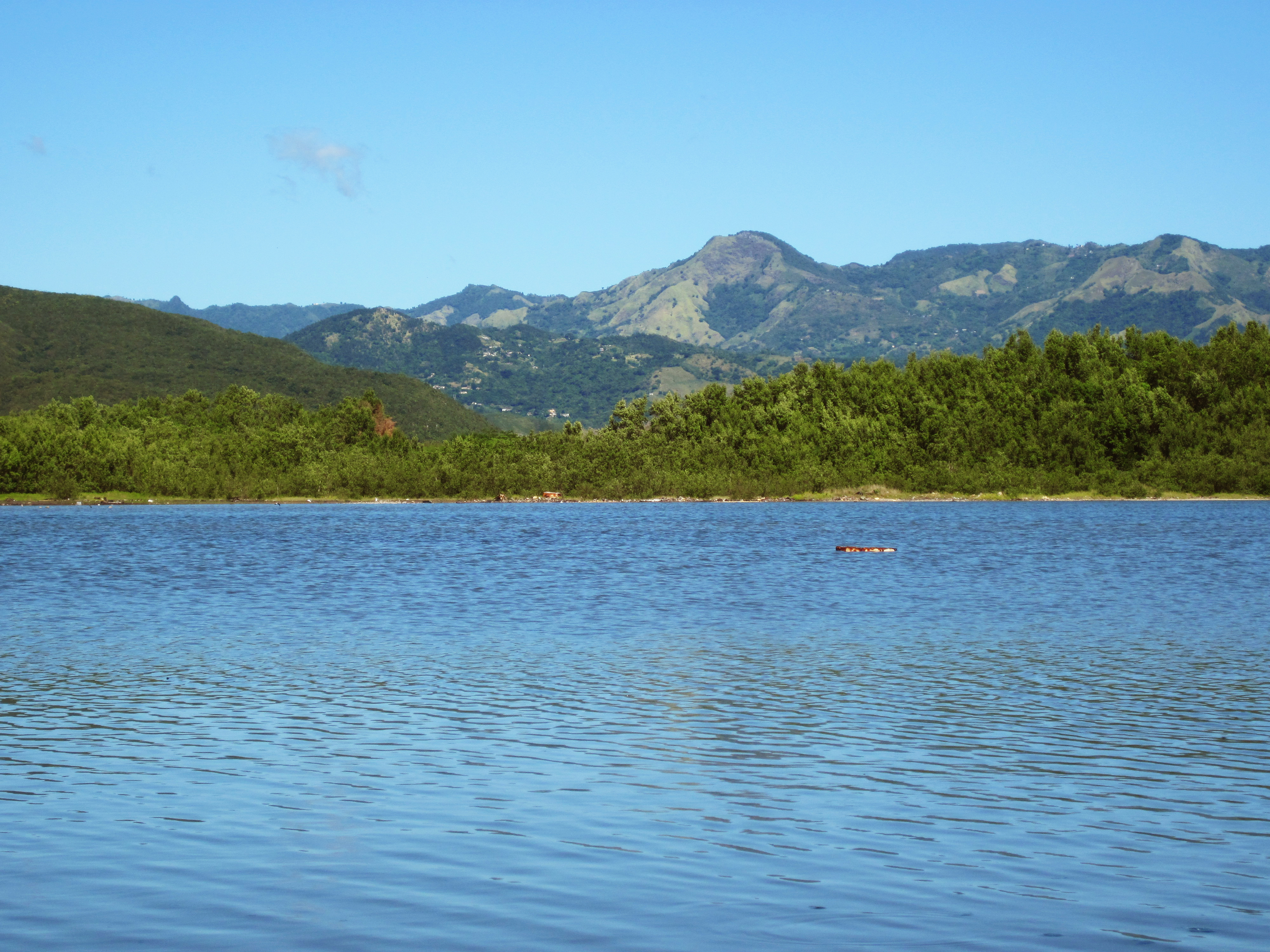
Cordillera Central from Guayanilla Bay.

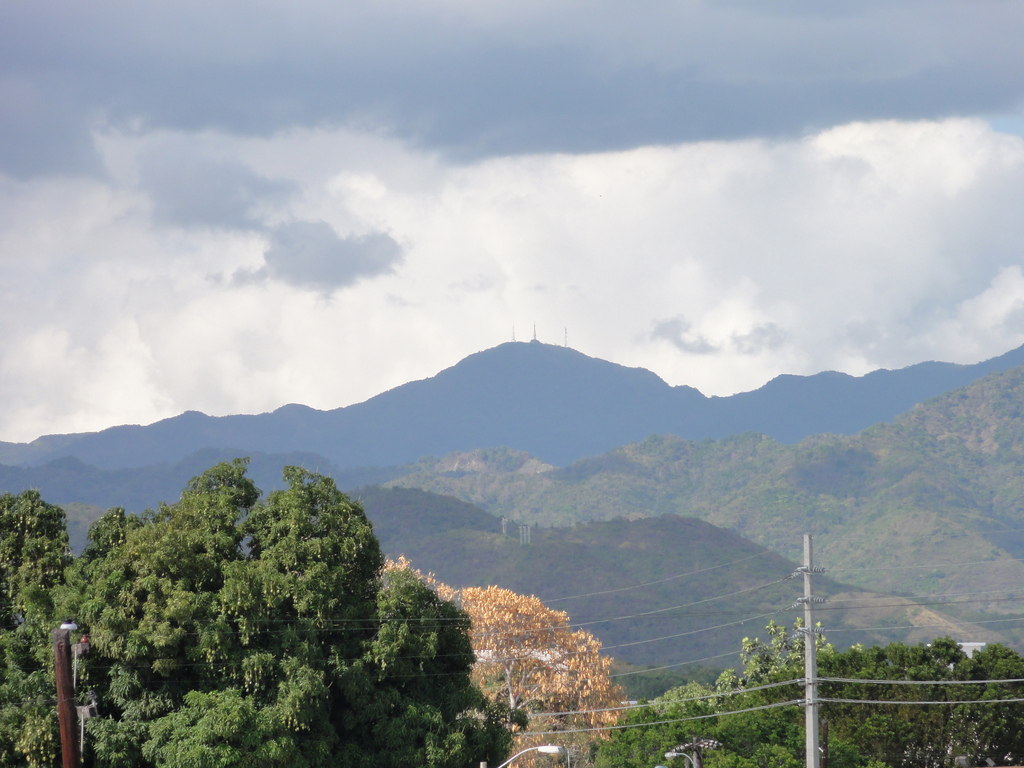
Cerro de Punta, Puerto Rico's highest peak, from downtown Ponce.

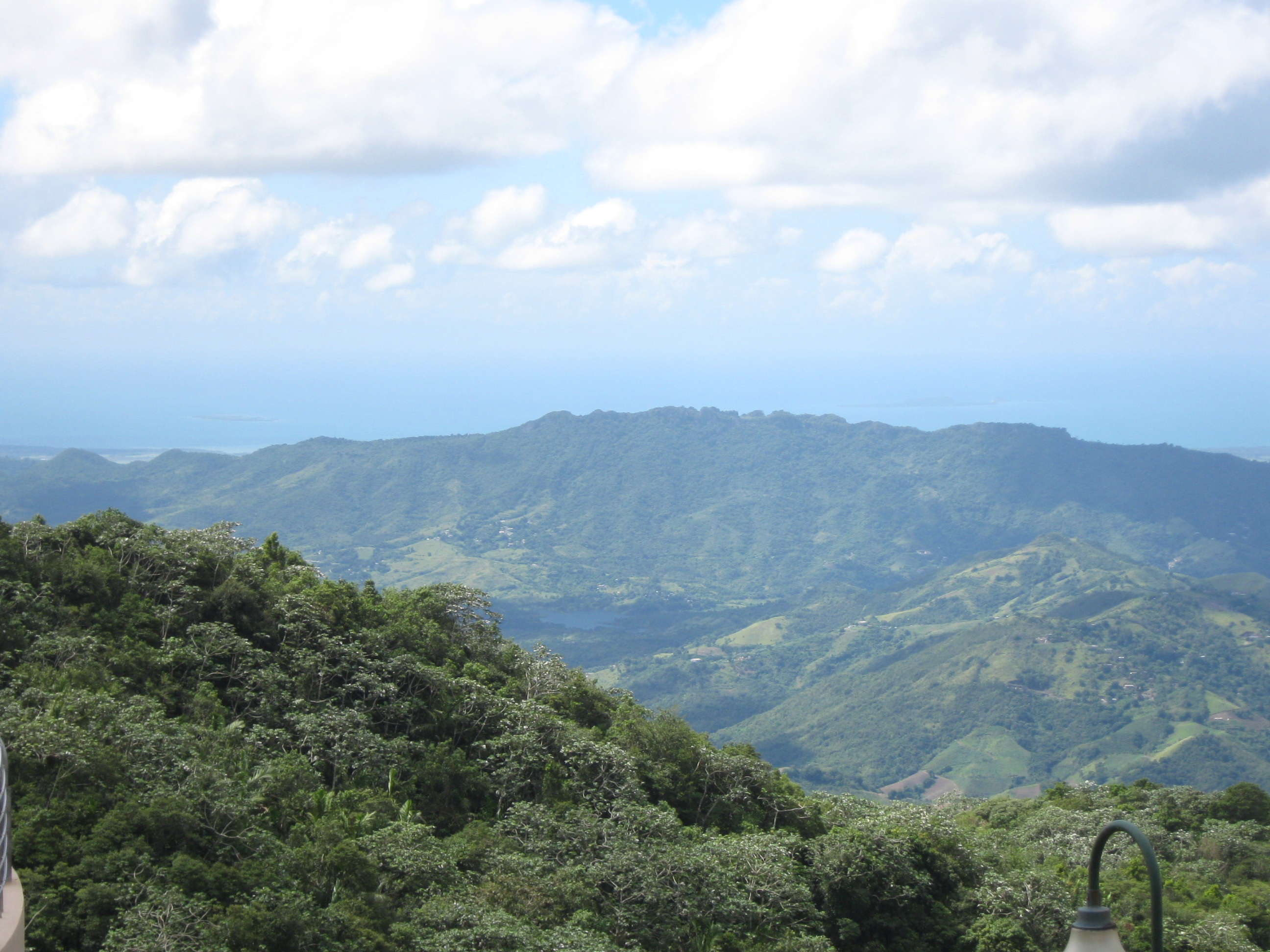
Cerro de las Cuevas from Mirador Villalba-Orocovis.

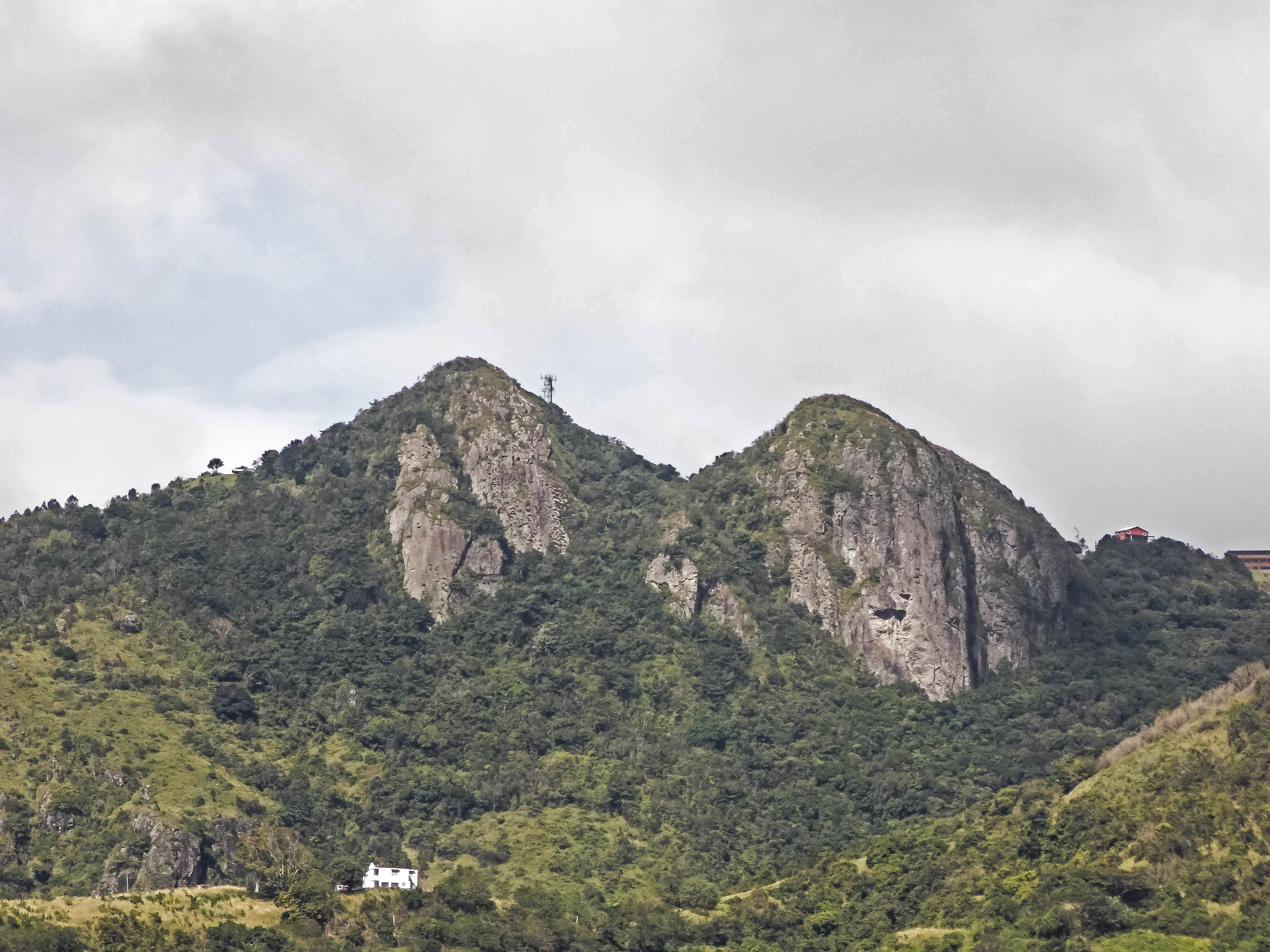
Cerro Las Tetas in Salinas close to the Aibonito Pass.

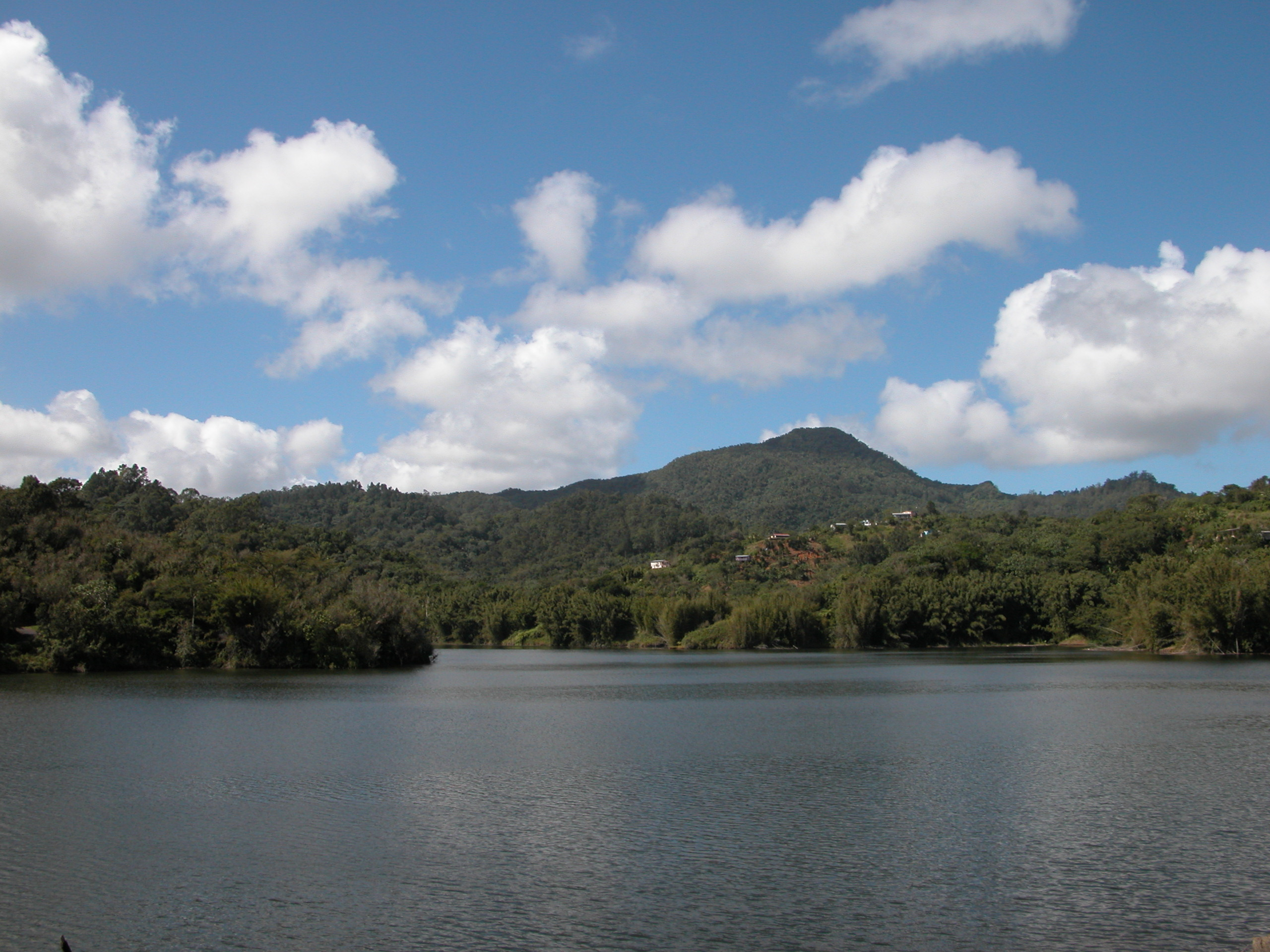
Sierra de Cayey from Patillas Lake.

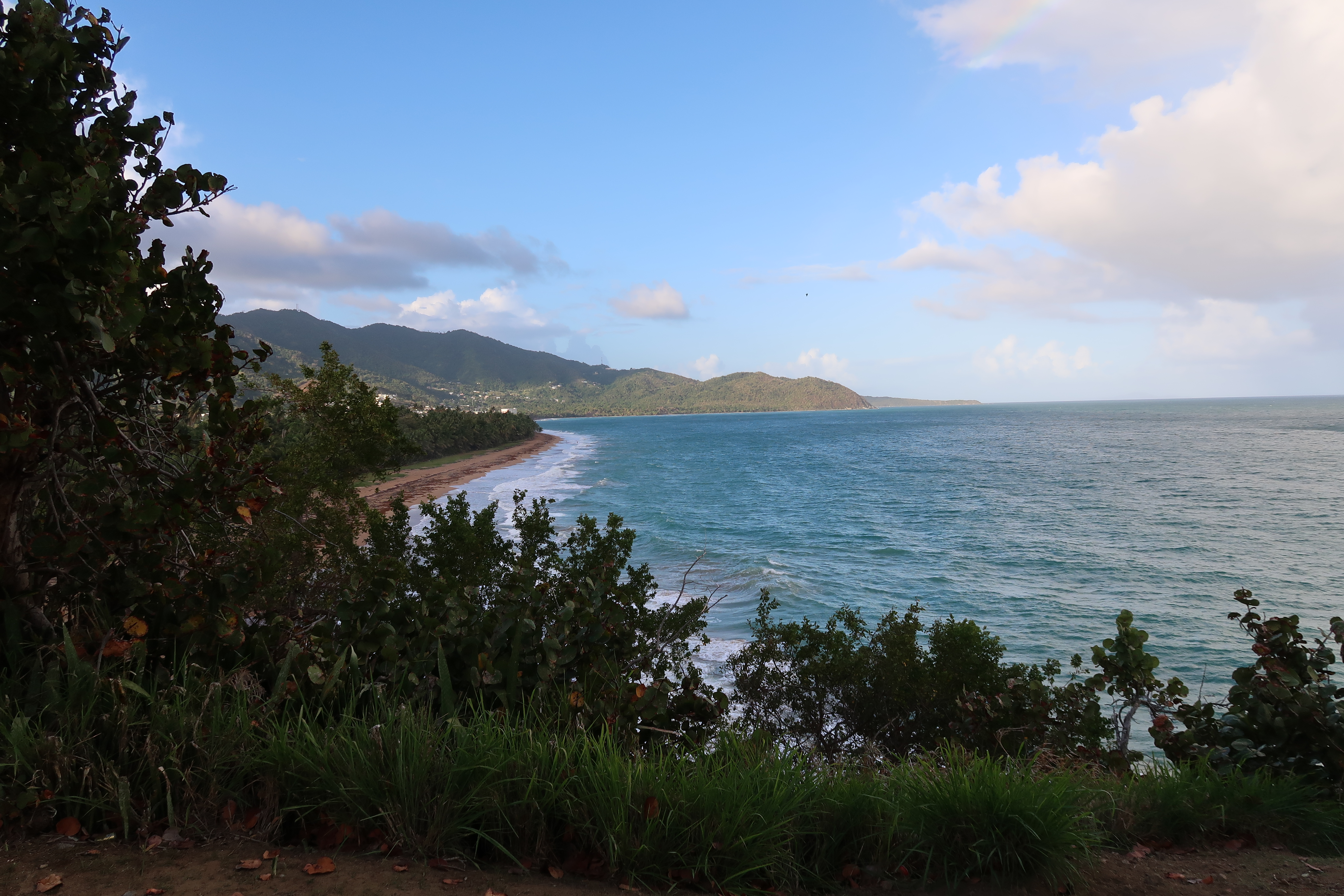
View of Sierra de Guardarraya, the easternmost end of the Cordillera Central physiographic province, from Punta Tuna, Maunabo.

== See also ==
- Geography of Puerto Rico
- Mountain ranges of the Caribbean
