= Puerto Rico Highway 141 =

Highway in Puerto Rico

Highway 141
- Ruta 141

Route information
- Maintained by Puerto Rico DTPW
- Length: 20.7 km (12.9 mi)
- Existed: 1953–present

Major junctions
- South end: PR-144 in Jayuya barrio-pueblo
- PR-5144 in Jayuya barrio-pueblo; PR-5141 in Río Grande; PR-533 in Río Grande–Mameyes Arriba; PR-530 in Mameyes Arriba; PR-613 in Mameyes Abajo–Mameyes Arriba
- North end: PR-140 in Mameyes Abajo

Location
- Country: United States
- Territory: Puerto Rico
- Municipalities: Jayuya, Ciales, Utuado

Highway system
- Roads in Puerto Rico; List
← PR-140	→ PR-142
← PR-5139	PR-5141	→ PR-5144

Puerto Rico Highway 141 (PR-141) is a road that travels from Jayuya, Puerto Rico to northeastern Utuado. This highway begins at PR-144 in downtown Jayuya and ends at PR-140 in Mameyes Abajo.

== Major intersections ==
Municipality	Location	km	mi	Destinations	Notes
Jayuya	Jayuya barrio-pueblo	0.0	0.0	PR-144 – Utuado, Villalba	Southern terminus of PR-141
Jayuya	Jayuya barrio-pueblo	0.4– 0.5	0.25– 0.31	PR-5144 – Villalba	
Jayuya	Río Grande	1.1	0.68	PR-5141 (Desvío Norte de Jayuya) – Utuado	
Jayuya	Río Grande–Mameyes Arriba line	5.5	3.4	PR-533 east – Ciales, Orocovis	
Ciales	No major junctions				
Jayuya	Mameyes Arriba	9.3	5.8	PR-530 – Mameyes Arriba	
Utuado–Jayuya municipal line	Mameyes Abajo–Mameyes Arriba line	17.5	10.9	PR-613 – Tetuán	
Utuado	Mameyes Abajo	20.7	12.9	PR-140 – Utuado, Florida	Northern terminus of PR-141
1.000 mi = 1.609 km; 1.000 km = 0.621 mi

== Related route ==
Highway 5141
- Location: Jayuya
- Length: 2.1 km (1.3 mi)

Puerto Rico Highway 5141 (PR-5141) is a bypass road that branches off from PR-141 northeast of downtown Jayuya and ends at PR-144 west of the municipal center. The entire route is located in Jayuya.

Location	km	mi	Destinations	Notes
Jayuya Abajo	0.0	0.0	PR-144 – Jayuya, Utuado	Western terminus of PR-5141
Jayuya Abajo	1.2	0.75	PR-532 – Jayuya	
Río Grande	2.1	1.3	PR-141 – Jayuya, Ciales	Eastern terminus of PR-5141
1.000 mi = 1.609 km; 1.000 km = 0.621 mi

== See also ==
- 1953 Puerto Rico highway renumbering
