= Pico Rodadero =

Mountain in Yauco, Puerto Rico

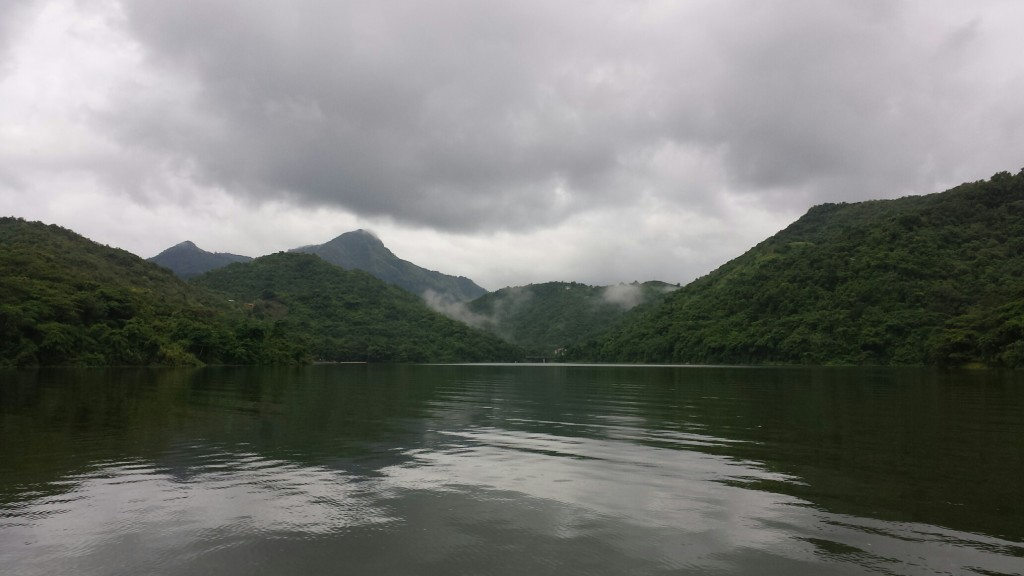
- Pico Rodadero from Lake Luchetti

Highest point
- Elevation: 2,864 ft (873 m)
- Coordinates: 18°06′14″N 66°49′07″W

Naming
- Etymology: Spanish for "roller peak"

Geography
- Location within Puerto Rico
- Location: Aguas Blancas, Duey and Sierra Alta in Yauco, Puerto Rico
- Parent range: Cordillera Central

Climbing
- Easiest route: Hike

Pico Rodadero is a mountain of the Cordillera Central in the municipality of Yauco, Puerto Rico. At 2,864 feet (873 m) above sea level, it is the second highest point in Yauco after Mount Membrillo. It is located in a tri-point boundary between the barrios Aguas Blancas, Duey and Sierra Alta, close to Lake Luchetti and Guilarte State Forest.

== Recreation ==
The mountain is popular for hiking, due to its well-maintained trail and its steep yet accessible grassy summit which offers beautiful views of the surrounding mountains, the southern valleys such as the Lajas Valley, and the Caribbean coast. The mountain is also famous for its cliffs and peculiar rock formations.

=== Charco Piazza ===
Charco Piazza is a natural pool created by waterfalls along the Duey River in barrio Duey. This pool is suitable for swimming, and is often visited when hiking Pico Rodadero due to its proximity and location along PR-372 and PR-375 roads.

== See also ==
- Cordillera Central
