= Aguas Blancas, Yauco, Puerto Rico =

Barrio of Puerto Rico

Aguas Blancas
- Barrio
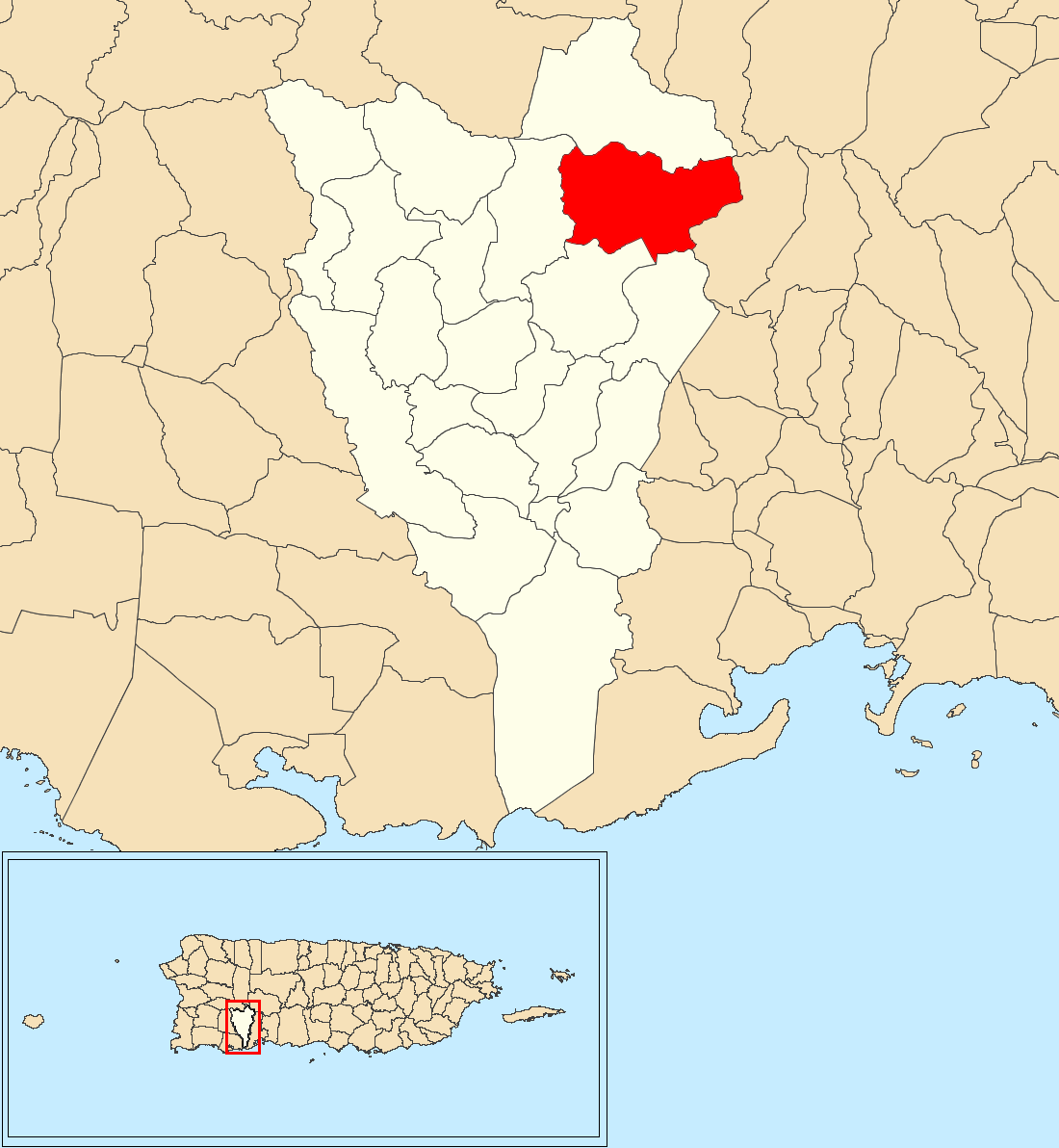
- Location of Aguas Blancas within the municipality of Yauco shown in red

- Location of Puerto Rico
- Coordinates: 18°07′38″N 66°49′31″W
- Commonwealth: Puerto Rico
- Municipality: Yauco

Area
  - Total: 4.7 sq mi (12 km^{2})
  - Land: 4.7 sq mi (12 km^{2})
  - Water: 0 sq mi (0 km^{2})
- Elevation: 2,297 ft (700 m)

Population (2010)
  - Total: 231
  - Density: 49.1/sq mi (19.0/km^{2})
- Source: 2010 Census
- Time zone: UTC−4 (AST)
- ZIP Code: 00698
- Area code: 787/939

Aguas Blancas is a barrio in the municipality of Yauco, Puerto Rico. Its population in 2010 was 231.

== History ==
Aguas Blancas was in Spain's gazetteers until Puerto Rico was ceded by Spain in the aftermath of the Spanish–American War under the terms of the Treaty of Paris of 1898 and became an unincorporated territory of the United States. In 1899, the United States Department of War conducted a census of Puerto Rico finding that the population of Aguas Blancas barrio was 1,170.

== Geography ==
Aguas Blancas is located in the Cordillera Central in northern Yauco, and the highest point of the municipality, at 2,864 ft (873 m) above sea level. It is partially located in the boundary with the Duey and Sierra Alta barrios. Duey River also runs through and originates in this barrio.

== Demographics ==
Historical population
Census	Pop.	Note	%±
1900	1,170		—
1910	940		−19.7%
1920	935		−0.5%
1930	778		−16.8%
1940	783		0.6%
1950	686		−12.4%
1960	654		−4.7%
1970	394		−39.8%
1980	333		−15.5%
1990	255		−23.4%
2000	316		23.9%
2010	231		−26.9%
U.S. Decennial Census; 1899 (shown as 1900) 1910-1930; 1930-1950 1980-2000 2010

== See also ==
- List of communities in Puerto Rico
