= Cerro Morales (Utuado, Puerto Rico) =

Mountain in Puerto Rico

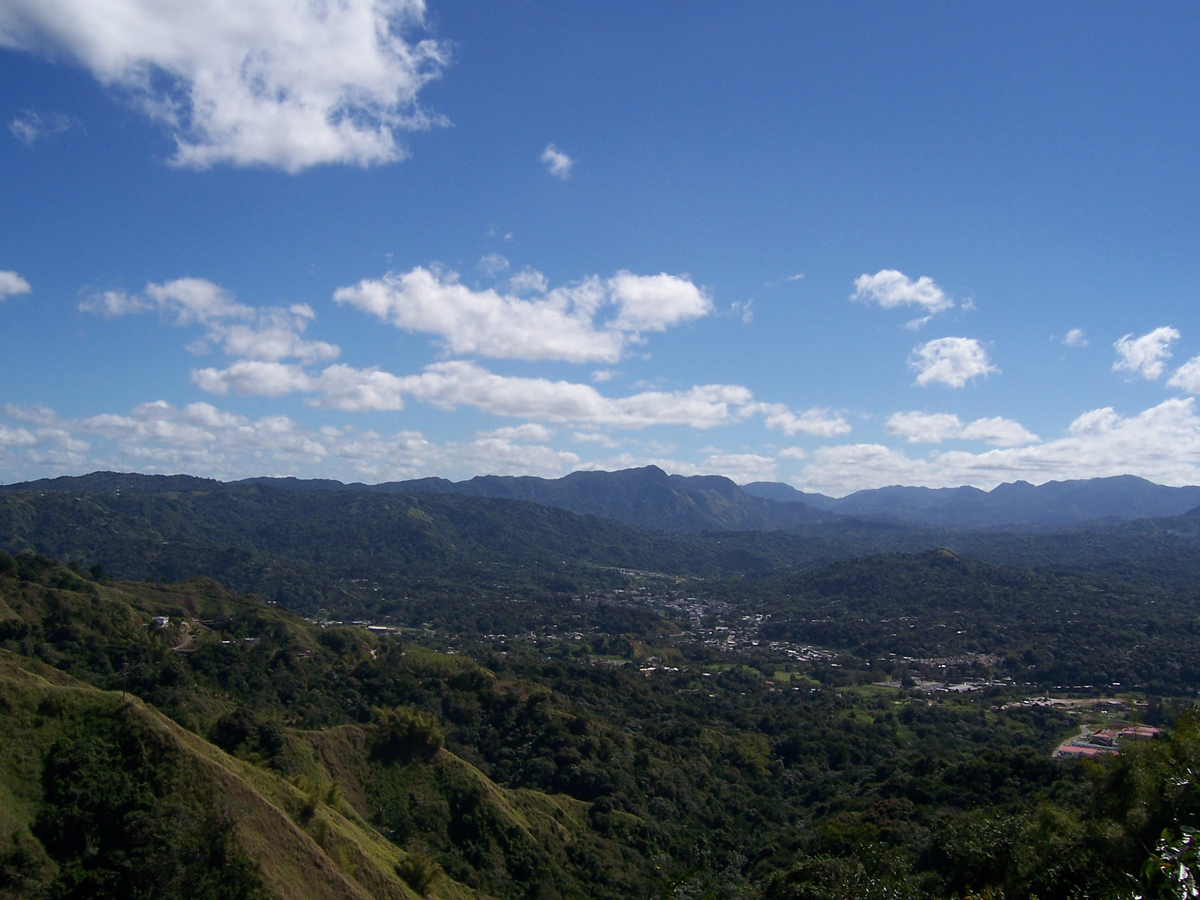
- Cerro Morales (Utuado Pueblo in the foreground) as seen from Caguana, Utuado.

Highest point
- Elevation: 3,214 ft (980 m)
- Prominence: 419 ft (128 m)
- Isolation: 5.6 mi (9.0 km)
- Coordinates: 18°14′50″N 66°37′30″W

Naming
- Etymology: Spanish for "Morales hill"

Geography
- Location within Puerto Rico
- Location: Jayuya, Puerto Rico, Utuado, Puerto Rico
- Parent range: Cordillera Central

Climbing
- Easiest route: Hike

Cerro Morales is the highest peak in the municipality of Utuado, raising to 3,214 feet (980 m) above sea level. The mountain is shared by the municipalities of Utuado, in the barrio of Tetuán, and Jayuya, in the barrio of Jayuya Abajo. The mountain is considered a geographical landmark as it can be observed from many places in Utuado.
