= Río La Venta =

River of Puerto Rico

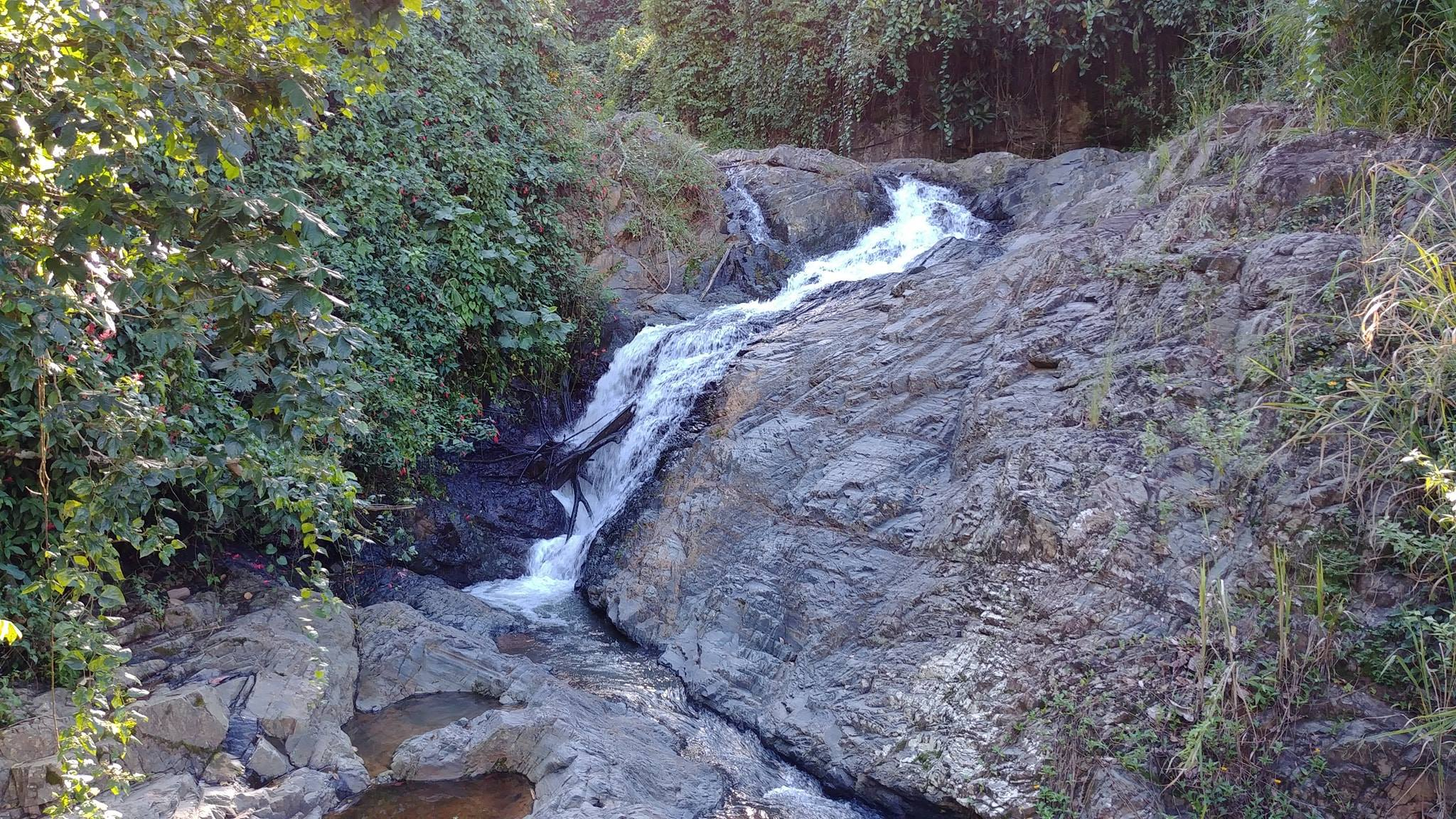
- Río La Venta in Mameyes Abajo barrio

Location
- Commonwealth: Puerto Rico
- Municipality: Utuado

Physical characteristics
- Source
  - coordinates: 18.3180070°N 66.6093398°W

The Río La Venta is a river located in Utuado, Puerto Rico.

== See also ==
- List of rivers of Puerto Rico
