= Amauropelta inabonensis =

Conservation status
- Endangered (ESA)

Scientific classification
- Kingdom: Plantae
- Clade: Tracheophytes
- Division: Polypodiophyta
- Class: Polypodiopsida
- Order: Polypodiales
- Suborder: Aspleniineae
- Family: Thelypteridaceae
- Genus: Amauropelta
- Species: A. inabonensis

Binomial name
- Amauropelta inabonensis (Proctor) Salino & T.E.Almeida

Synonyms
- Thelypteris inabonensis Proctor

Species of fern

Amauropelta inabonensis, synonym Thelypteris inabonensis, is a rare species of fern known by the common name cordillera maiden fern. It is endemic to Puerto Rico, where it is known from only two localities: at the headwaters of Río Inabón and at the Toro Negro State Forest. It is a federally listed endangered species of the United States.

This fern was first described in 1985. It was placed on the endangered species list in 1993. At that time it was known to exist at two locations in the mountain forests of Puerto Rico, one near the Río Inabón in the Toro Negro Commonwealth Forest and one on Cerro Rosa in Ciales (Cerro Rosa is also located in the Toro Negro State Forest). In total there were about 46 individual plants counted.

This terrestrial fern has fronds up to 60 centimeters long divided into 25 or 30 pairs of lightly hairy segments. The sori are arranged around the veins on the undersides. They are covered with hairy indusia.
