= Mameyes Abajo =

Barrio of Utuado, Puerto Rico

- Barrio
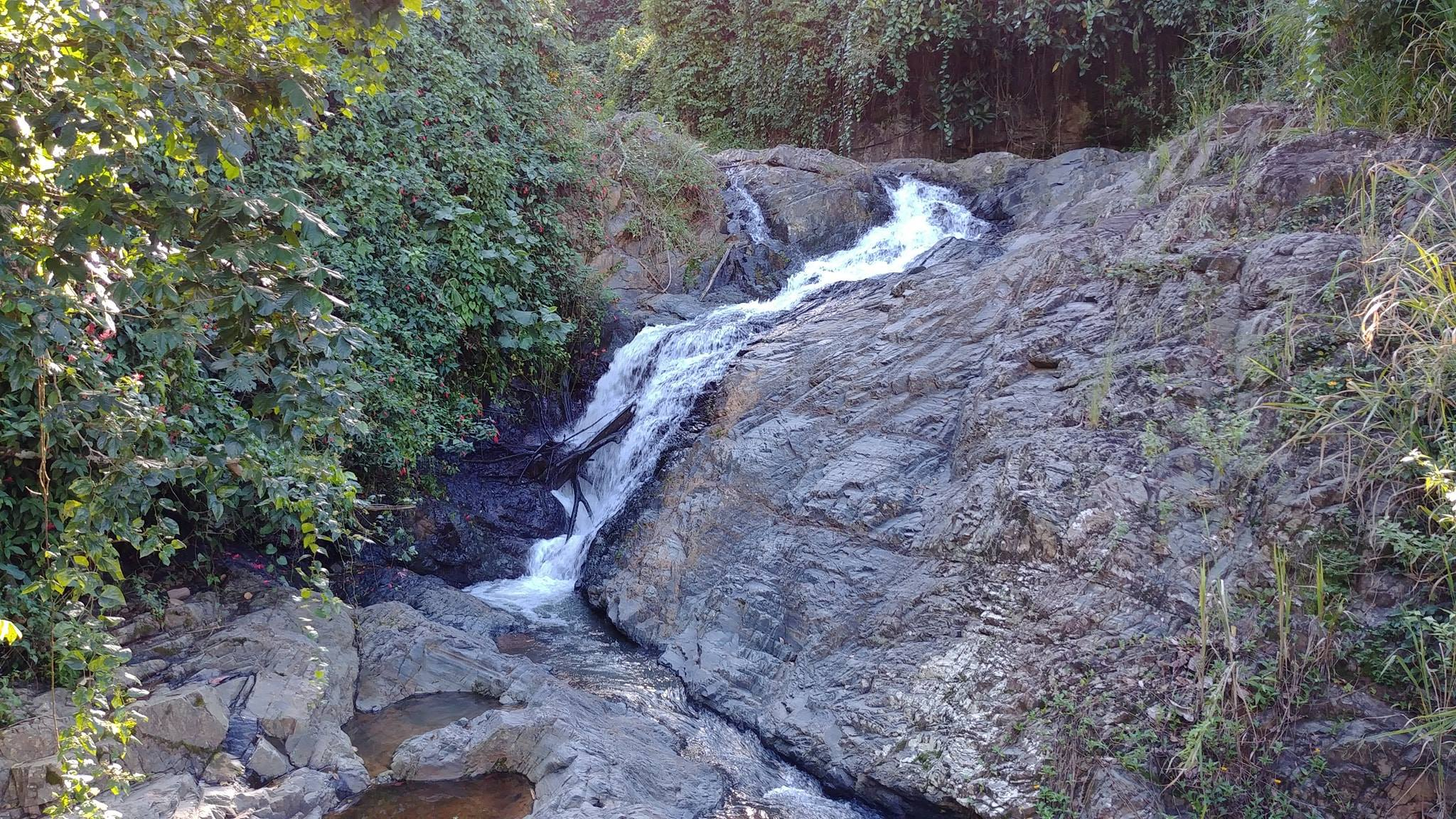
- Río La Venta in Mameyes Abajo

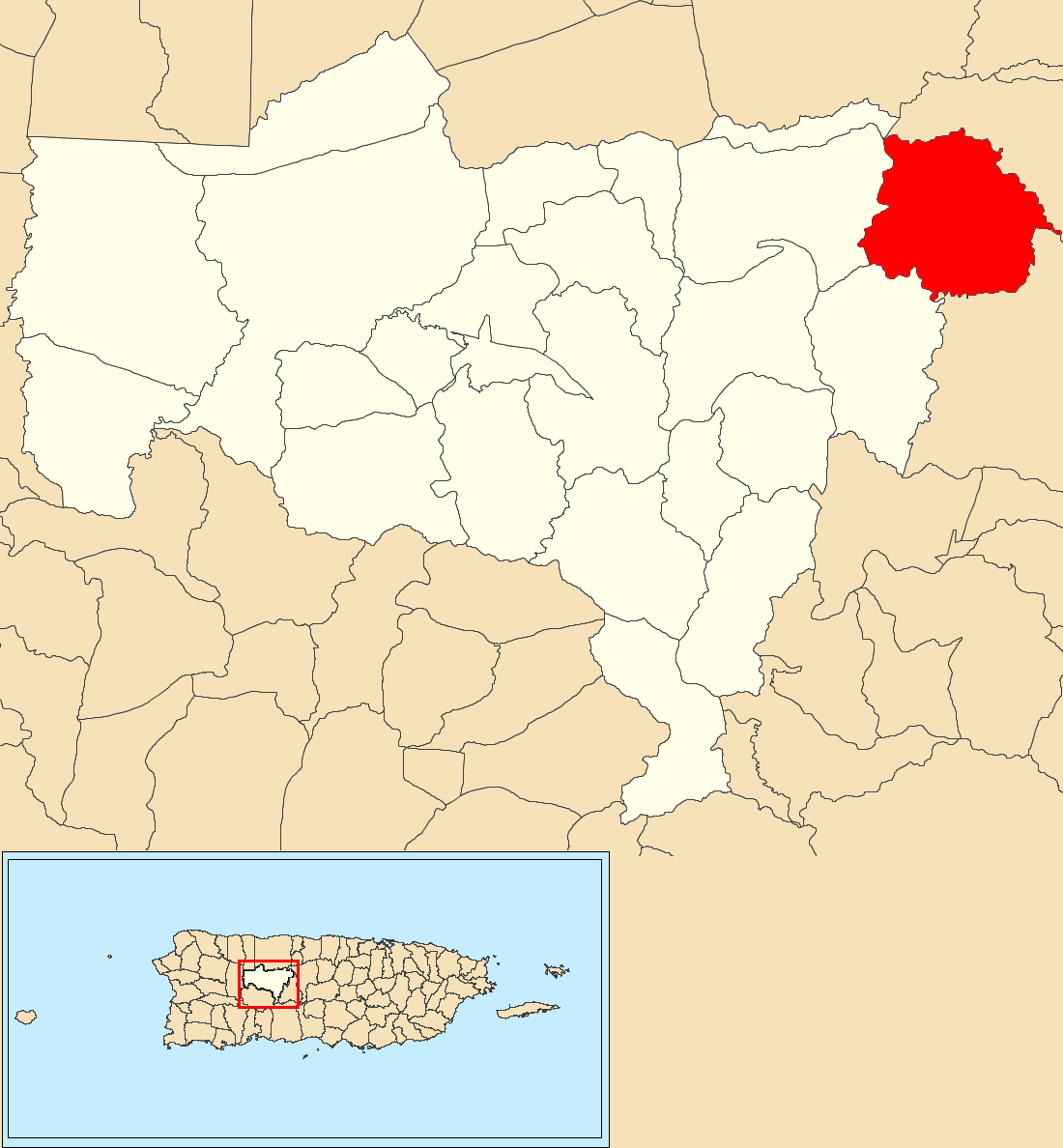
- Location of Mameyes Abajo within the municipality of Utuado shown in red

- Location of Puerto Rico
- Coordinates: 18°18′10″N 66°35′37″W
- Commonwealth: Puerto Rico
- Municipality: Utuado

Area
  - Total: 6.23 sq mi (16.1 km^{2})
  - Land: 6.23 sq mi (16.1 km^{2})
  - Water: 0 sq mi (0 km^{2})
- Elevation: 1,129 ft (344 m)

Population (2010)
  - Total: 1,136
  - Density: 182.3/sq mi (70.4/km^{2})
- Source: 2010 Census
- Time zone: UTC−4 (AST)

Mameyes Abajo is a barrio in the municipality of Utuado, Puerto Rico. Its population in 2010 was 1,136. The corresponding Mameyes Arriba (Upper Mameyes) is located in neighbouring Jayuya at a higher elevation, but was once part of Utuado as well.

The Río La Venta is a river in Mameyes Abajo.

== History ==
Mameyes Abajo was in Spain's gazetteers until Puerto Rico was ceded by Spain in the aftermath of the Spanish–American War under the terms of the Treaty of Paris of 1898 and became an unincorporated territory of the United States. In 1899, the United States Department of War conducted a census of Puerto Rico finding that the population of Mameyes barrio was 4,268.

Historical population
Census	Pop.	Note	%±
1900	4,268		—
1910	1,535		−64.0%
1920	1,796		17.0%
1930	1,765		−1.7%
1940	1,830		3.7%
1950	1,445		−21.0%
1960	1,181		−18.3%
1970	1,075		−9.0%
1980	1,033		−3.9%
1990	1,079		4.5%
2000	1,207		11.9%
2010	1,136		−5.9%
U.S. Decennial Census; 1899 (shown as 1900) 1910-1930; 1930-1950 1980-2000 2010

== See also ==
- List of communities in Puerto Rico
