= Cerro Doña Juana =

Mountain in Orocovis, Puerto Rico

- Location within Puerto Rico

Highest point
- Elevation: 1,058 m (3,471 ft)
- Prominence: 1,058 m (3,471 ft)
- Coordinates: 18°10′18.4074″N 66°28′51.28″W

Geography
- Location: Orocovis, Puerto Rico
- Parent range: Cordillera Central

Climbing
- Easiest route: Hike

Cerro Doña Juana is the highest peak in the municipality of Orocovis, Puerto Rico, rising to 1,058 meters (3,471 ft) above sea level. It is part of the Toro Negro State Forest, and is the 12th tallest mountain in Puerto Rico.

== Hiking and access trail ==
Trail number 3, known as "Camino Torre Observacion", makes its way up to Cerro Doña Juana from Trail #1 (Camino El Bolo) which can be started at the Toro Negro State Forest visitors area. The visitors parking area is located on PR-143, km 34.4. PR-143 is a winding two-lane mountain road that must be travelled very slowly as it is not possible to see traffic coming the opposite direction for any significant length. Route 143 can be accessed via the better-traveled Route 10. Route 143 is part of the Ruta Panorámica. There is an observation tower atop Cerro Doña Juana.
