= Guaonico =

Barrio of Utuado, Puerto Rico

- Barrio
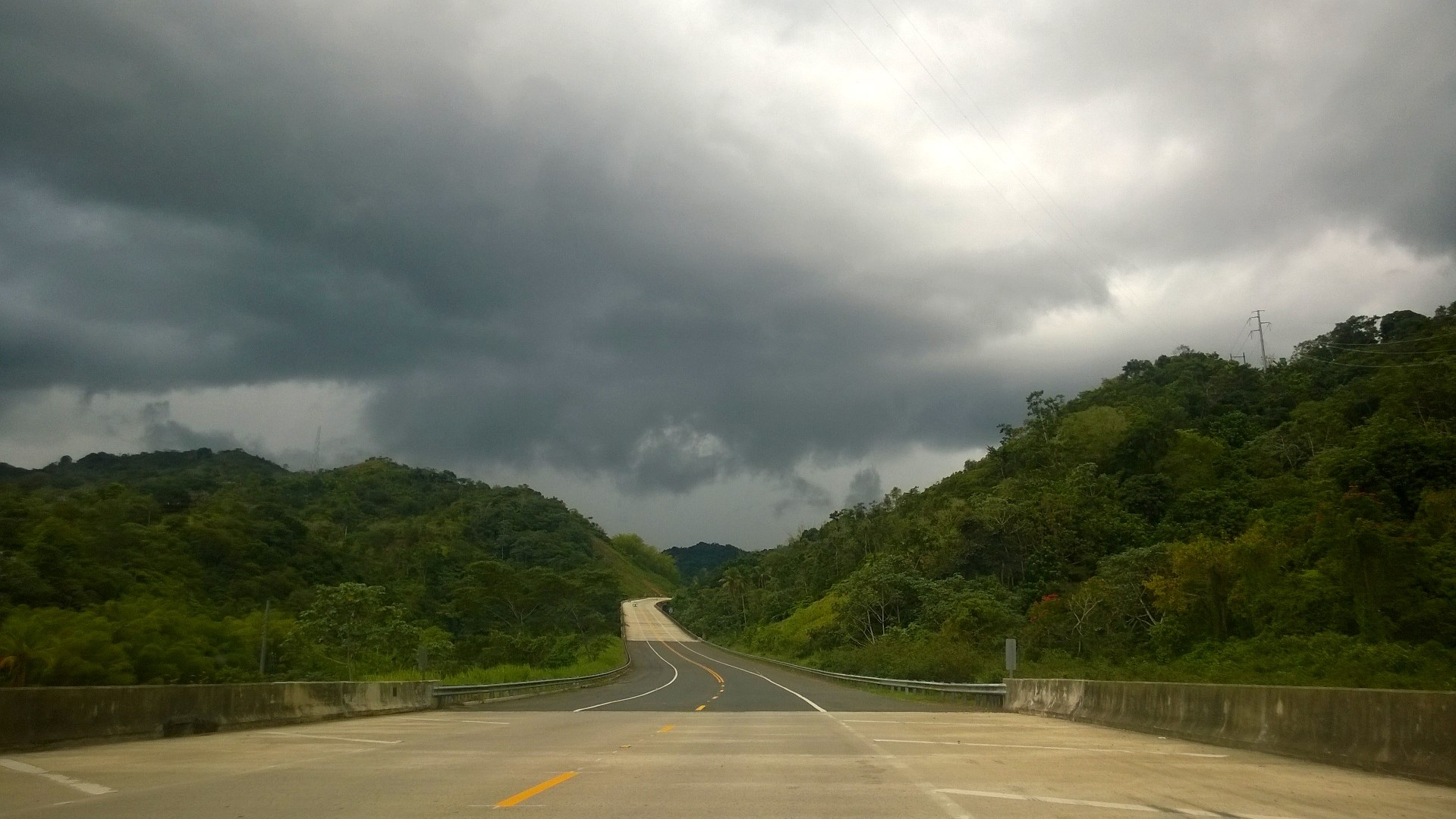
- Puerto Rico Highway 10 in Guaonico

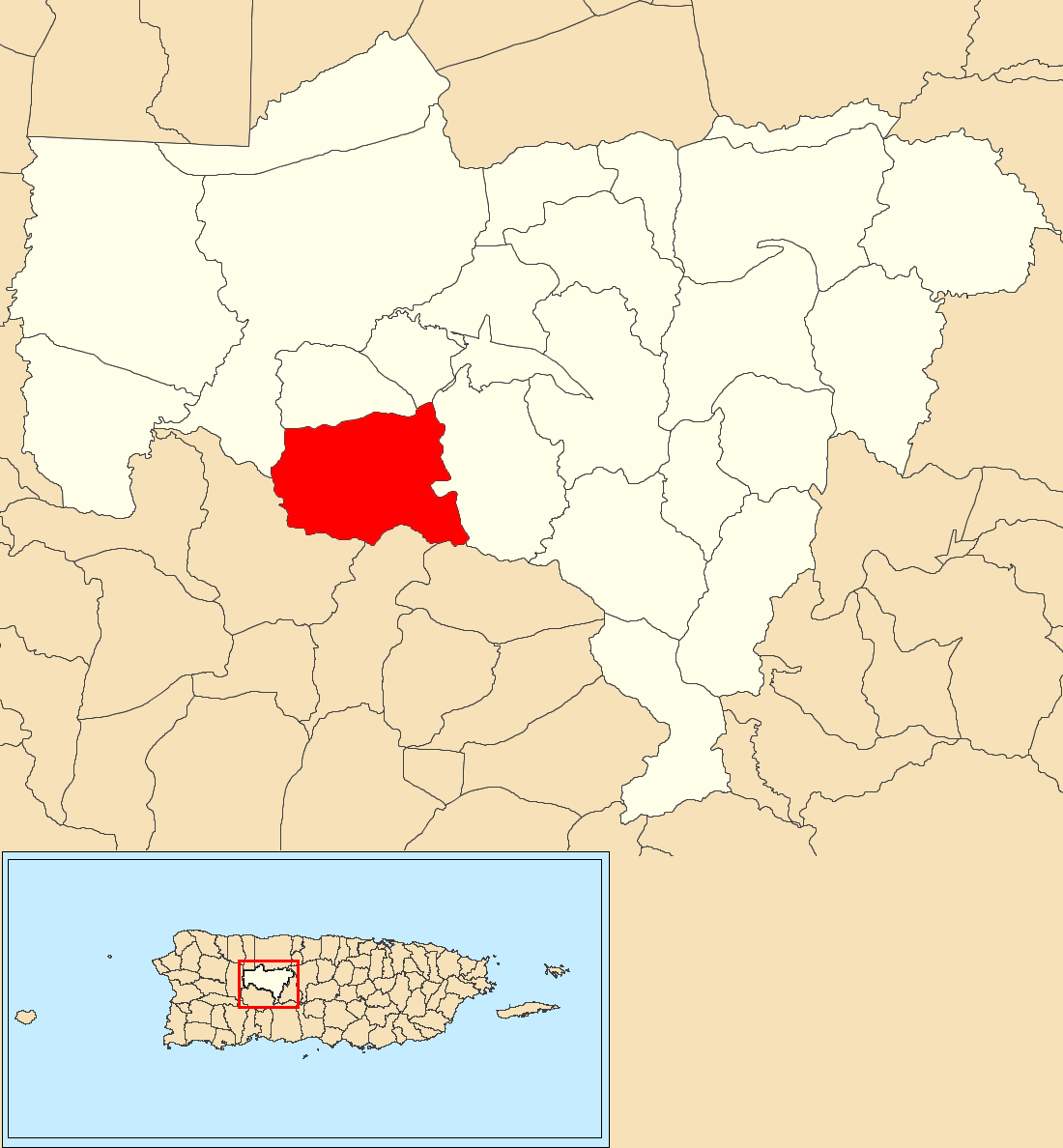
- Location of Guaonico within the municipality of Utuado shown in red

- Location of Puerto Rico
- Coordinates: 18°14′15″N 66°44′25″W
- Commonwealth: Puerto Rico
- Municipality: Utuado

Area
  - Total: 5.58 sq mi (14.5 km^{2})
  - Land: 5.58 sq mi (14.5 km^{2})
  - Water: 0 sq mi (0 km^{2})
- Elevation: 1,132 ft (345 m)

Population (2010)
  - Total: 538
  - Density: 96.4/sq mi (37.2/km^{2})
- Source: 2010 Census
- Time zone: UTC−4 (AST)

Guaonico is a barrio in the municipality of Utuado, Puerto Rico. Its population in 2010 was 538.

== History ==
Guaonico was in Spain's gazetteers until Puerto Rico was ceded by Spain in the aftermath of the Spanish–American War under the terms of the Treaty of Paris of 1898 and became an unincorporated territory of the United States. In 1899, the United States Department of War conducted a census of Puerto Rico finding that the population of Guaonico barrio was 771.

Historical population
Census	Pop.	Note	%±
1900	771		—
1910	636		−17.5%
1920	690		8.5%
1930	634		−8.1%
1940	590		−6.9%
1950	1,263		114.1%
1960	784		−37.9%
1970	942		20.2%
1980	394		−58.2%
1990	581		47.5%
2000	654		12.6%
2010	538		−17.7%
U.S. Decennial Census; 1899 (shown as 1900) 1910-1930; 1930-1950 1980-2000 2010

== See also ==
- List of communities in Puerto Rico
