= Antonio S. Lucchetti =

Puerto Rican electrical engineer

- Born: Antonio S. Lucchetti Otero; 20 January 1888; Ponce, Puerto Rico
- Died: 19 December 1958 (aged 70); San Juan, Puerto Rico
- Education: Electrical engineer
- Alma mater: Cornell University College of Engineering
- Known for: Father of the Puerto Rico Electric Power Authority

Antonio S. Lucchetti (20 January 1888 – 19 December 1958) was a Puerto Rican engineer and public servant, through whom comprehensive electric service was established in Puerto Rico via the Puerto Rico Water Resources Authority (PRWRA) and, later, via the public electric company, Fuentes Fluviales.

Lucchetti was instrumental in establishing the Utilización de las Fuentes Fluviales in Puerto Rico. Utilizacion was established to provide electric services not provided by private companies. Lucchetti observed that private companies operated inefficiently and, in 1937, worked for the government to acquire the first of the three electric companies operating in the Island, the Ponce Electric Co., and to build hydroelectric plants at Carite and Toro Negro.

== Early years and training ==
Antonio S. Lucchetti Otero was born in Ponce, Puerto Rico in 1888. He graduated with a degree in electrical engineering from Cornell University College of Engineering in 1910.

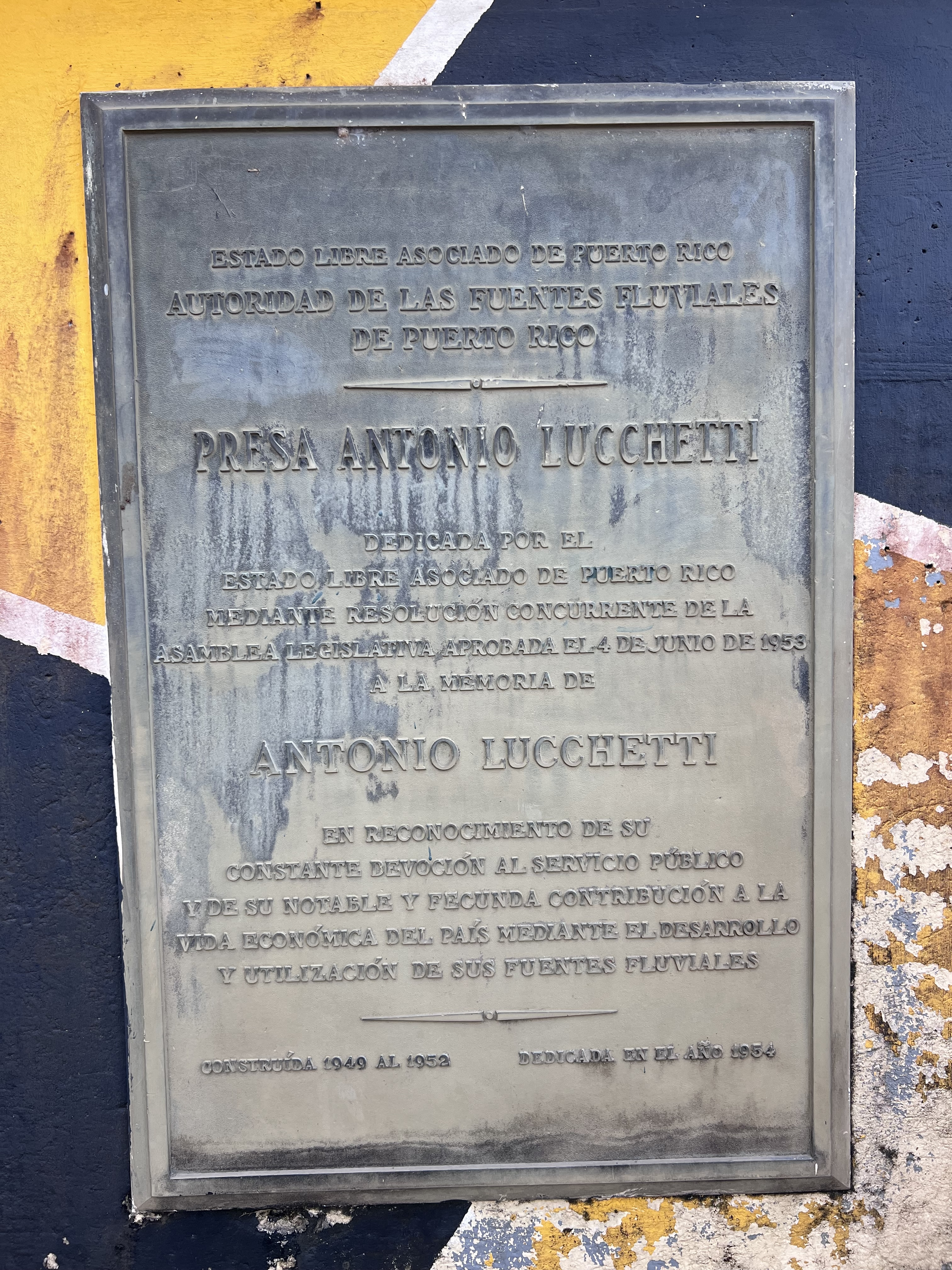
Plaque inscription at the bridge of the Lake Lucchetti dam in Yauco (Spanish)

== History ==
Despite the fact that Puerto Rico had no fossil fuels for energy development, there were many rivers to supply electrical needs via hydroelectricity. Lucchetti was at time executive director of the Utilización de las Fuentes Fluviales (later known as the Autoridad de las Fuentes Fluviales, or AFF, and now called the Autoridad de Energía Eléctrica or PREPA). He judged that what the government of Puerto Rico needed to do at the moment was to purchase the three private electric companies operating in the island: the Ponce Electric Co., the Porto Rico Railway Light & Power Company, and Mayagüez Light, Ice & Power Co., and concentrate on building and island-wide energy infrastructure. He estimated the cost at $7 million.

== Efforts to create the Electric Energy Authority ==
Lucchetti next reasoned that for the power infrastructure to be built, it was necessary to issue government bonds. Prior to 1938, these bonds would have been tied to the insular government's ability to pay. Fortunately, on 25 June 1938, the U.S. Congress amended the Organic Act of Puerto Rico to authorize public corporations to issuance of bonds without such condition. Lucchetti tried to take advantage of this federal initiative, but encountered opposition to this plan when the US-appointed Governor of Puerto Rico, Blanton Winship, vetoed the project in 1938 on the grounds that it was incompatible with the 1917 Jones-Shafroth Act.

== Fuentes Fluviales created ==
Lucchetti did not give up on his efforts to create the power infrastructure he sensed the Island needed. He continued to try to kickoff his plan through efforts in the U.S. Congress. However, due to the reluctance of the insular Legislature, the project was unsuccessful. However, on 2 May 1941, the newly appointed Governor of Puerto Rico, Guy J. Swope, approved Lucchetti's plan and signed the law creating the Autoridad de las Fuentes Fluviales. The creation of Fuentes Fluviales made possible the development of electric energy Puerto Rico needed in order to make possible the Operation Bootstrap industrialization that started in the late 1940s.

== Death and legacy ==
Lucchetti died in 1956, having seen his dream become a reality.

- The Puerto Rico Power Authority building located at 1110 Ave Ponce De Leon, San Juan, Puerto Rico, 00907 is named after Antonio Lucchetti.
- In Arecibo, Puerto Rico, there the "Escuela Superior Vocacional Antonio Lucchetti" high school named in his honor.
- In Yauco there is a 108-hectares man-made lake and dam named after him.
- In Bayamón the Antonio Lucchetti Industrial Park ("Zona Industrial Antonio Lucchetti") is named after him.
- At the University of Puerto Rico at Mayagüez, the Mechanical Engineering building is named in his honor.

== See also ==
- List of Puerto Ricans
