= Cerro Rosa =

Mountain in Puerto Rico

- Location within Puerto Rico

Highest point
- Elevation: 1,263 m (4,144 ft)
- Coordinates: 18°10′40″N 66°31′56″W

Geography
- Location: Ciales / Jayuya, Puerto Rico
- Parent range: Cordillera Central

Climbing
- Easiest route: Hike

Cerro Rosa is the third highest peak of Puerto Rico measuring 1,263 meters (4,144 ft) above sea level. The mountain is located in the Cordillera Central, on the border between the municipalities of Ciales and Jayuya.
