= Río Grande, Jayuya, Puerto Rico =

Barrio of Puerto Rico

Río Grande
- Barrio
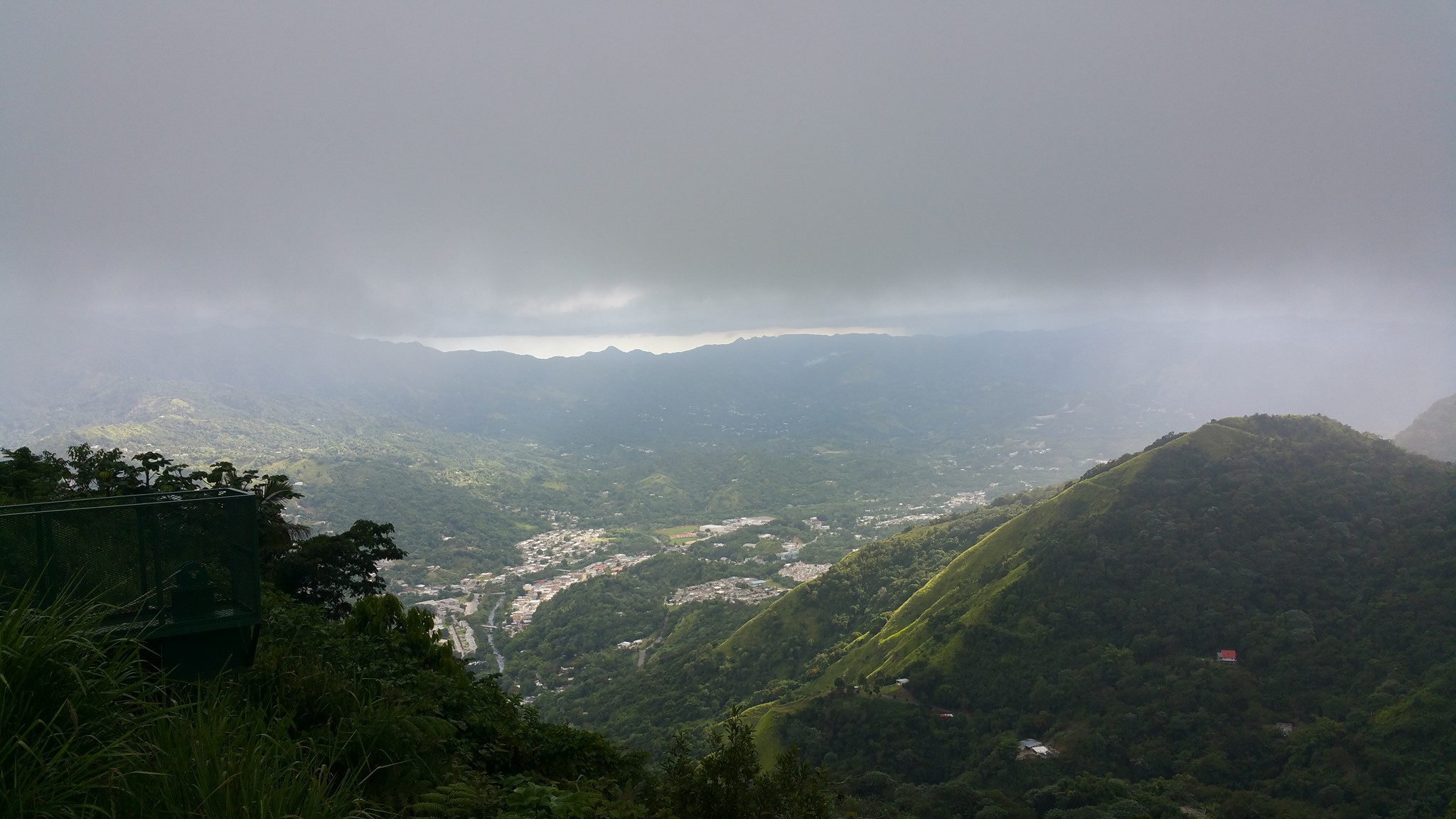
- View from Cerro Cumbre Alta in Río Grande

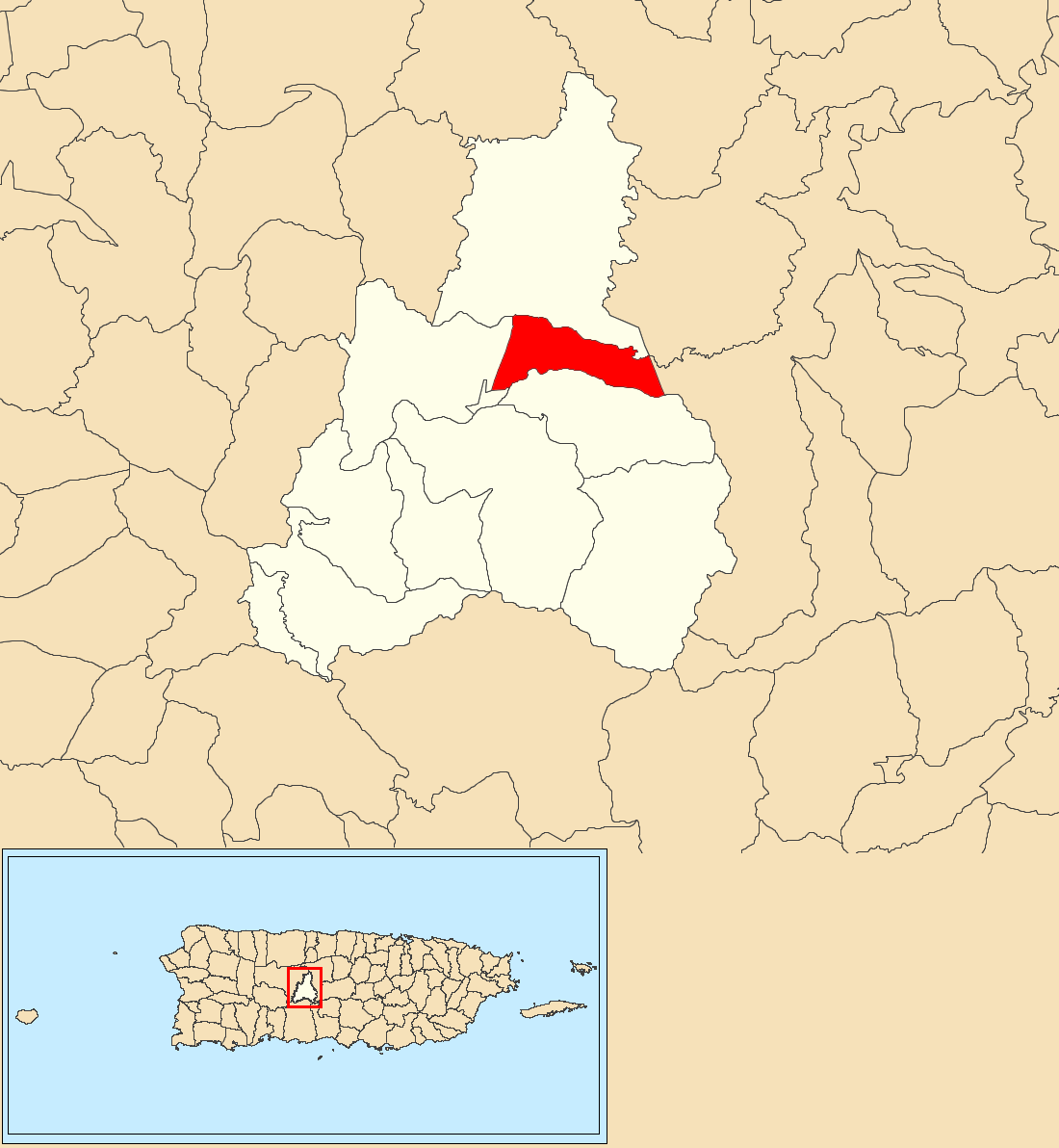
- Location of Río Grande within the municipality of Jayuya shown in red

- Location of Puerto Rico
- Coordinates: 18°13′49″N 66°34′18″W
- Commonwealth: Puerto Rico
- Municipality: Jayuya

Area
  - Total: 1.89 sq mi (4.9 km^{2})
  - Land: 1.89 sq mi (4.9 km^{2})
  - Water: 0.00 sq mi (0 km^{2})
- Elevation: 1,946 ft (593 m)

Population (2010)
  - Total: 879
  - Density: 465.1/sq mi (179.6/km^{2})
- Source: 2010 Census
- Time zone: UTC−4 (AST)
- ZIP Code: 00664
- Area code: 787/939

Río Grande is a barrio in the municipality of Jayuya, Puerto Rico. Its population in 2010 was 879.

Historical population
Census	Pop.	Note	%±
1950	1,488		—
1960	1,022		−31.3%
1970	812		−20.5%
1980	749		−7.8%
1990	607		−19.0%
2000	910		49.9%
2010	879		−3.4%
U.S. Decennial Census; 1900 (N/A) 1910-1930; 1930-1950 1980-2000 2010

== See also ==
- List of communities in Puerto Rico
