= Sierra Alta =

Barrio of Yauco, Puerto Rico

- Barrio
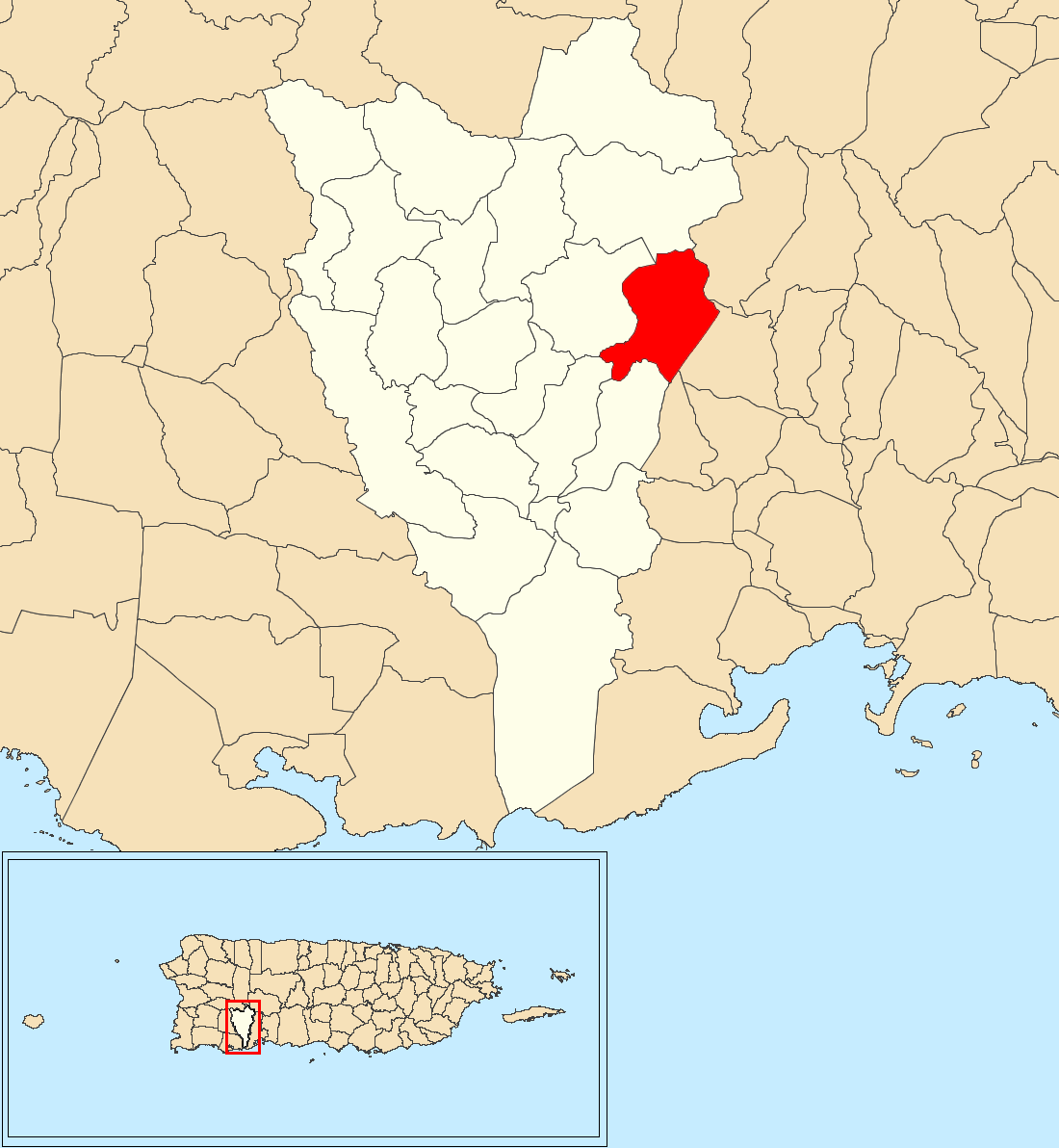
- Location of Sierra Alta within the municipality of Yauco shown in red

- Location of Puerto Rico
- Coordinates: 18°05′25″N 66°49′02″W
- Commonwealth: Puerto Rico
- Municipality: Yauco

Area
  - Total: 2.94 sq mi (7.6 km^{2})
  - Land: 2.94 sq mi (7.6 km^{2})
  - Water: 0 sq mi (0 km^{2})
- Elevation: 686 ft (209 m)

Population (2010)
  - Total: 1,063
  - Density: 361.6/sq mi (139.6/km^{2})
- Source: 2010 Census
- Time zone: UTC−4 (AST)
- ZIP Code: 00698
- Area code: 787/939

Sierra Alta is a barrio in the municipality of Yauco, Puerto Rico. Its population in 2010 was 1,063.

== History ==
Sierra Alta was in Spain's gazetteers until Puerto Rico was ceded by Spain in the aftermath of the Spanish–American War under the terms of the Treaty of Paris of 1898 and became an unincorporated territory of the United States. In 1899, the United States Department of War conducted a census of Puerto Rico finding that the population of Sierra Alta barrio was 1,411.

Historical population
Census	Pop.	Note	%±
1900	1,411		—
1910	1,317		−6.7%
1920	1,535		16.6%
1930	1,493		−2.7%
1940	1,182		−20.8%
1950	1,477		25.0%
1960	1,434		−2.9%
1970	1,241		−13.5%
1980	1,211		−2.4%
1990	960		−20.7%
2000	1,119		16.6%
2010	1,063		−5.0%
U.S. Decennial Census; 1899 (shown as 1900) 1910-1930; 1930-1950 1980-2000 2010

== See also ==
- List of communities in Puerto Rico
