= Mameyes Arriba =

Barrio of Jayuya, Puerto Rico

- Barrio
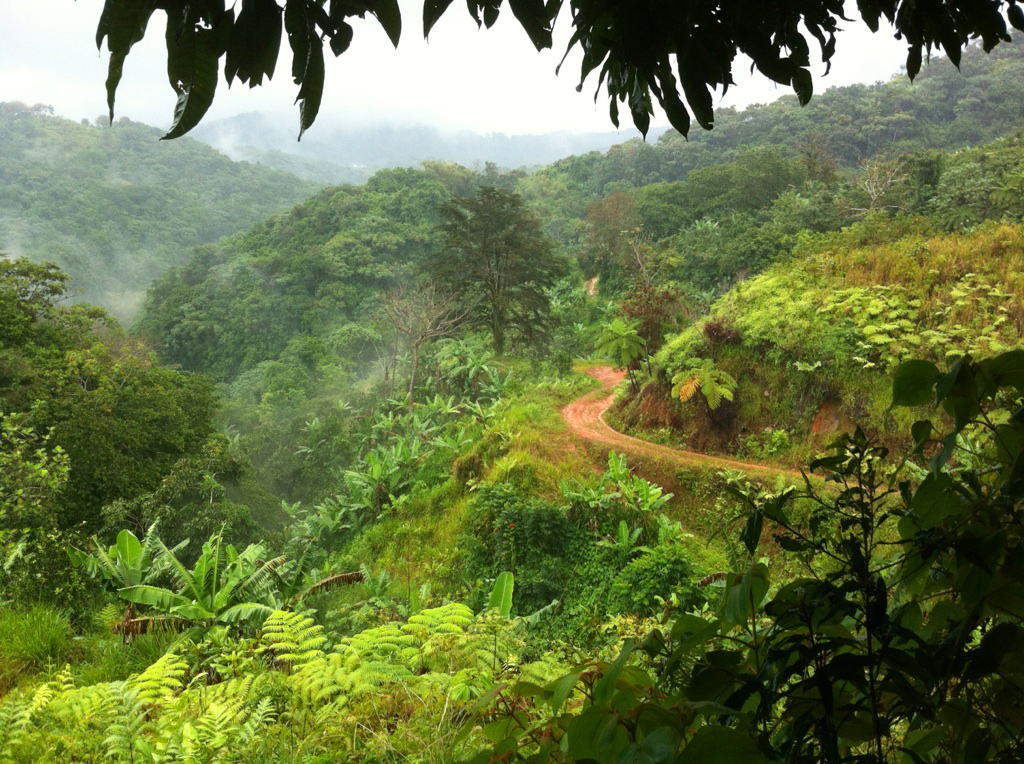
- Unpaved road in the mountains of Mameyes Arriba

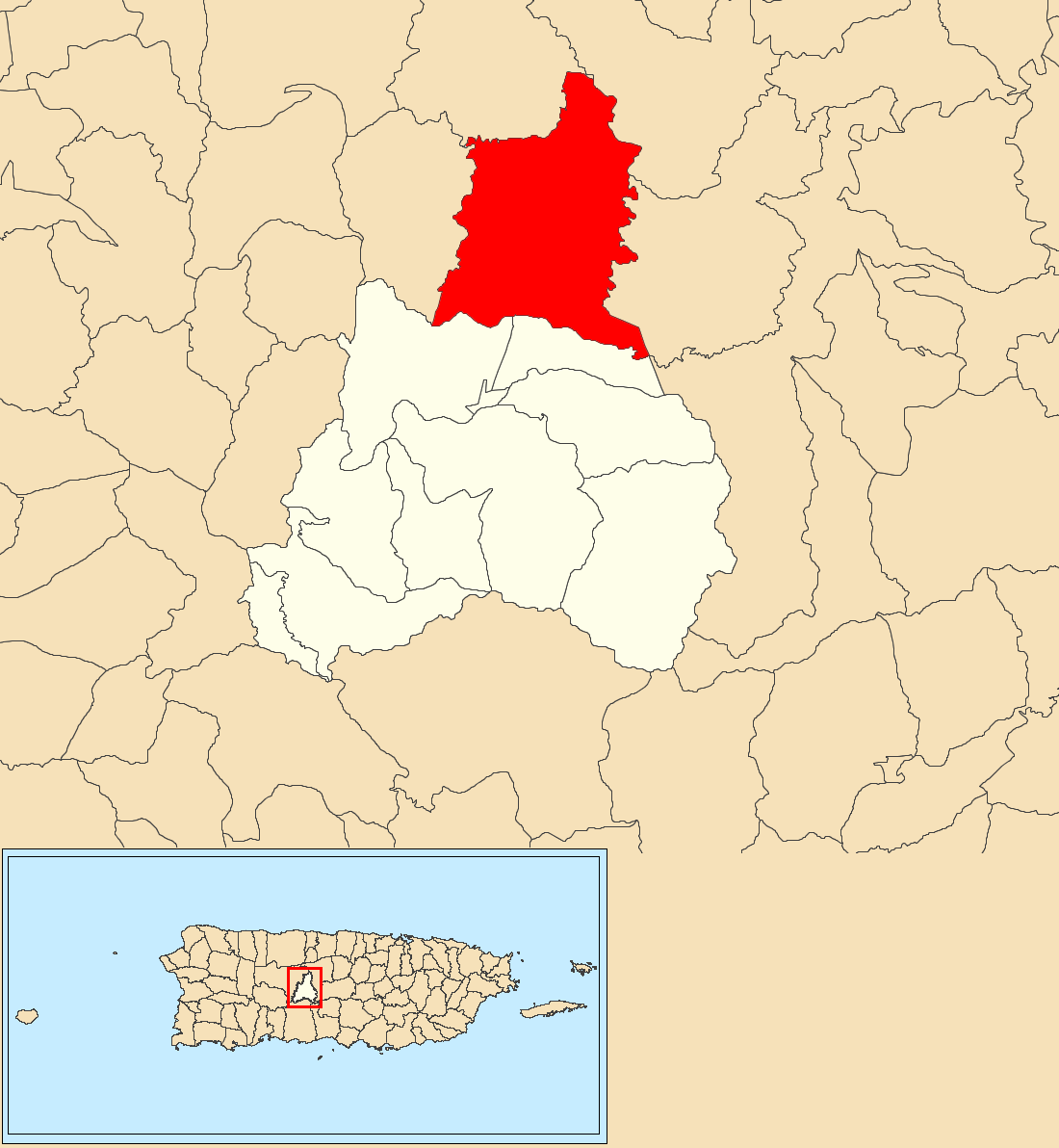
- Location of Mameyes Arriba within the municipality of Jayuya shown in red

- Location of Puerto Rico
- Coordinates: 18°15′45″N 66°34′39″W
- Commonwealth: Puerto Rico
- Municipality: Jayuya

Area
  - Total: 9.515 sq mi (24.64 km^{2})
  - Land: 9.514 sq mi (24.64 km^{2})
  - Water: 0.001 sq mi (0.0026 km^{2})
- Elevation: 1,696 ft (517 m)

Population (2010)
  - Total: 2,240
  - Density: 235.3/sq mi (90.8/km^{2})
- Source: 2010 Census
- Time zone: UTC−4 (AST)
- ZIP Code: 00664
- Area code: 787/939

Mameyes Arriba (Barrio Mameyes Arriba) is a barrio in the municipality of Jayuya, Puerto Rico. Its population in 2010 was 2,240.

Historical population
| Census | Pop. | Note | %± |
|---|---|---|---|
| 1910 | 2,451 | | — |
| 1920 | 2,950 | | 20.4% |
| 1930 | 2,205 | | −25.3% |
| 1940 | 2,714 | | 23.1% |
| 1950 | 2,436 | | −10.2% |
| 1960 | 2,517 | | 3.3% |
| 1970 | 1,945 | | −22.7% |
| 1980 | 1,943 | | −0.1% |
| 1990 | 1,929 | | −0.7% |
| 2000 | 2,268 | | 17.6% |
| 2010 | 2,240 | | −1.2% |
U.S. Decennial Census; 1900 (N/A) 1910-1930; 1930-1950 1980-2000 2010

== Gallery ==
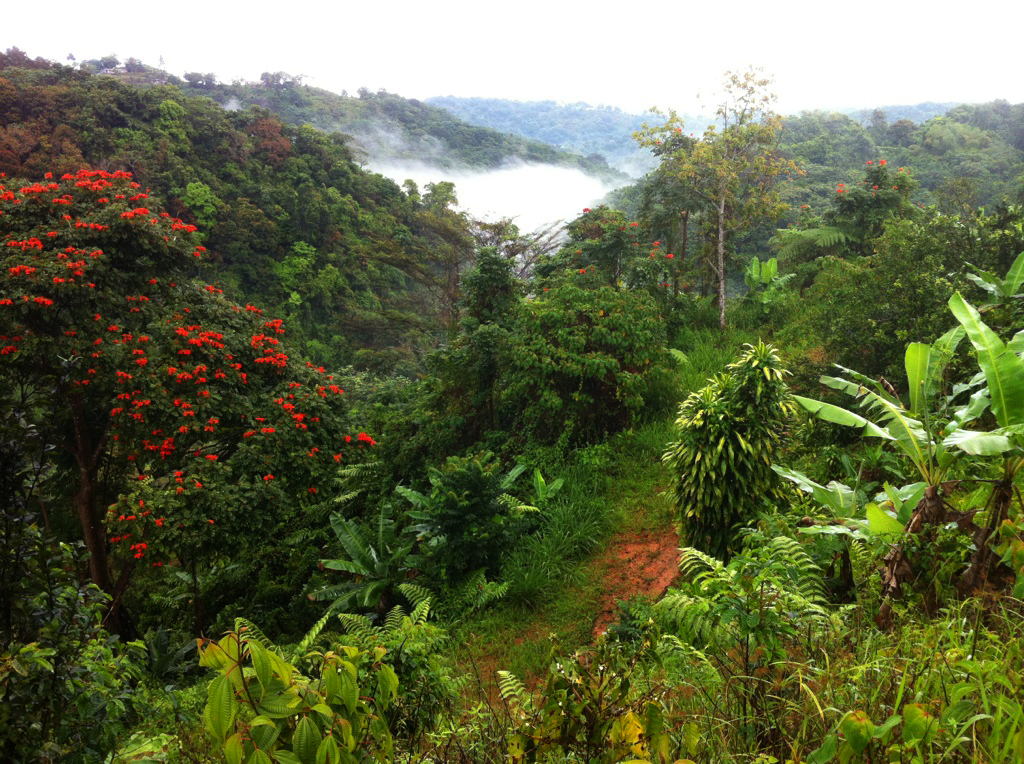
Mountains and clouds in Mameyes Arriba

== See also ==
- List of communities in Puerto Rico
