= Duey River (Yauco, Puerto Rico) =

River of Puerto Rico

Coordinates: 18.0527410°N 66.8510095°W

- Native name: Río Duey (Spanish)

Location
- Commonwealth: Puerto Rico
- Municipality: Yauco

The Duey River is a river in Yauco, Puerto Rico.

== See also ==
- List of rivers of Puerto Rico
