= Tetuán, Utuado, Puerto Rico =

Barrio of Puerto Rico

Tetuán
- Barrio
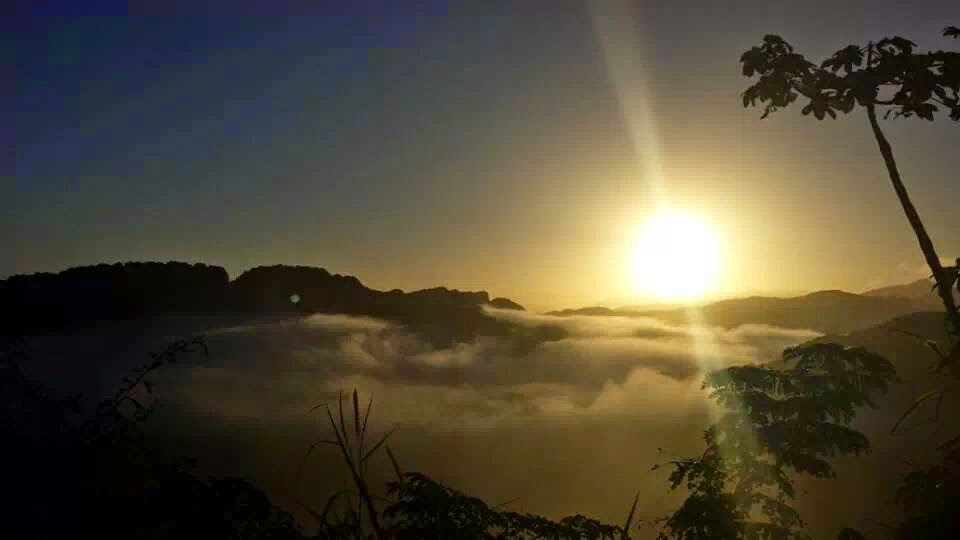
- Sunrise as seen from Finca Vista Bella, a winery in Tetuán

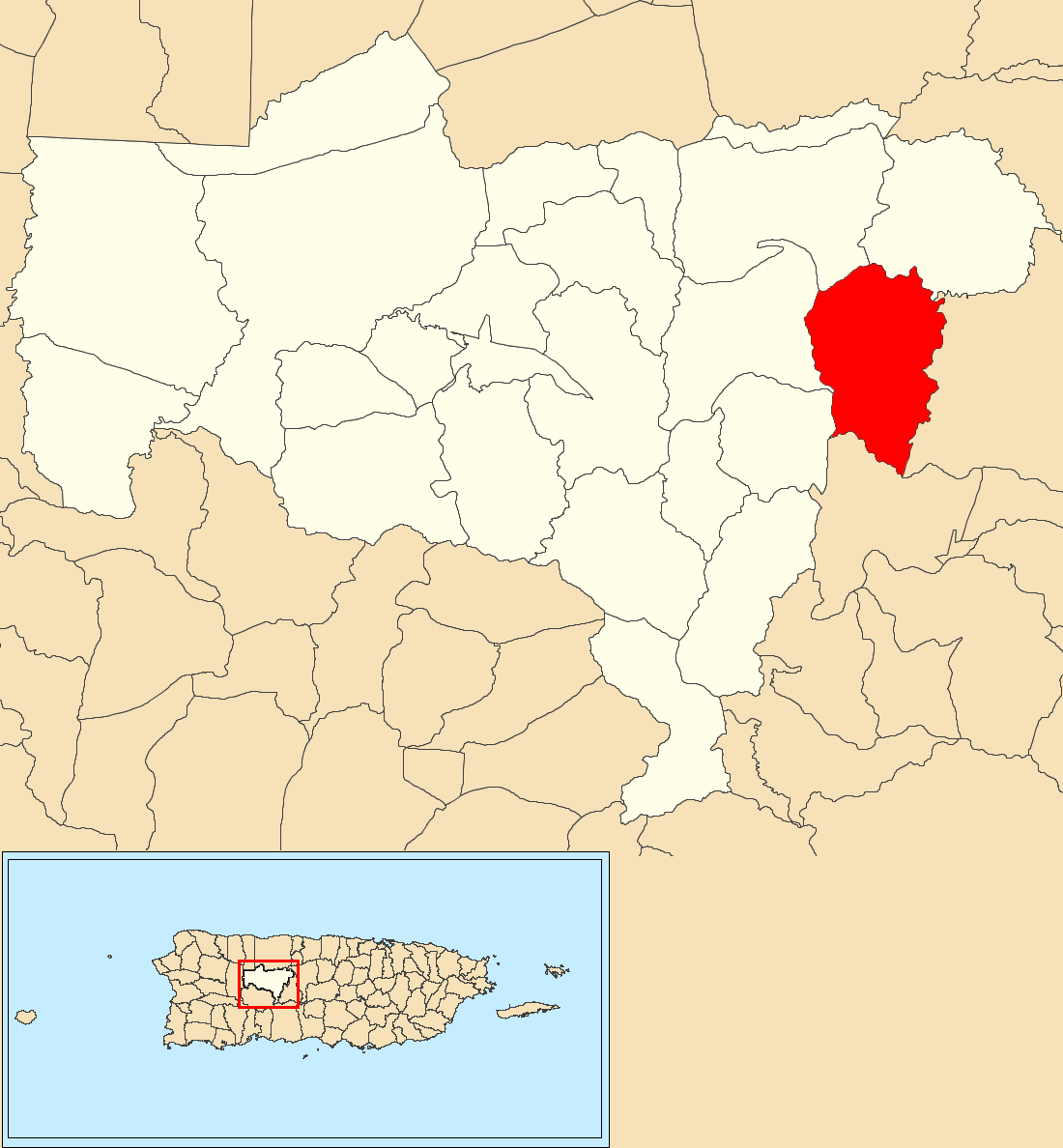
- Location of Tetuán within the municipality of Utuado shown in red

- Location of Puerto Rico
- Coordinates: 18°16′04″N 66°36′45″W
- Commonwealth: Puerto Rico
- Municipality: Utuado

Area
  - Total: 5.46 sq mi (14.1 km^{2})
  - Land: 5.46 sq mi (14.1 km^{2})
  - Water: 0 sq mi (0 km^{2})
- Elevation: 2,096 ft (639 m)

Population (2010)
  - Total: 680
  - Density: 124.5/sq mi (48.1/km^{2})
- Source: 2010 Census
- Time zone: UTC−4 (AST)

Tetuán is a barrio in the municipality of Utuado, Puerto Rico. Its population in 2010 was 680.

== History ==
Tetuán was in Spain's gazetteers until Puerto Rico was ceded by Spain in the aftermath of the Spanish–American War under the terms of the Treaty of Paris of 1898 and became an unincorporated territory of the United States. In 1899, the United States Department of War conducted a census of Puerto Rico finding that the population of Tetuán barrio was 1,678.

Historical population
Census	Pop.	Note	%±
1900	1,678		—
1910	1,390		−17.2%
1920	1,736		24.9%
1930	1,268		−27.0%
1940	1,306		3.0%
1950	1,054		−19.3%
1960	878		−16.7%
1970	689		−21.5%
1980	747		8.4%
1990	617		−17.4%
2000	756		22.5%
2010	680		−10.1%
U.S. Decennial Census; 1899 (shown as 1900) 1910-1930; 1930-1950 1980-2000 2010

== Landslide ==
On May 28, 2019 a landslide occurred in Tetuán cutting off many families' access to the main road, Puerto Rico Highway 140. The mayor said landslides are a normal occurrence in the Utuado municipality.

== See also ==
- List of communities in Puerto Rico
