= Duey, Yauco, Puerto Rico =

Barrio of Puerto Rico

Duey
- Barrio
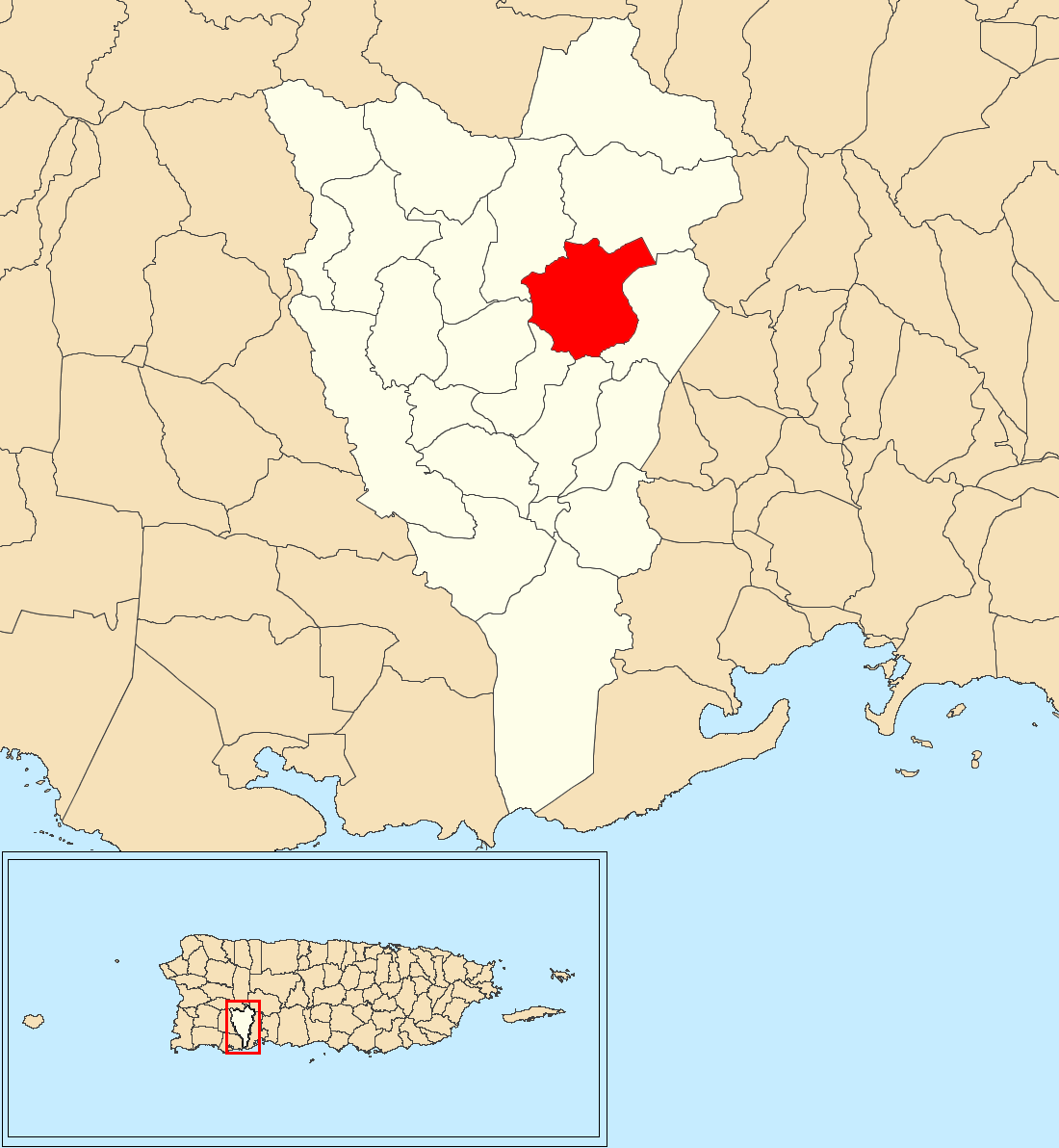
- Location of Duey within the municipality of Yauco shown in red

- Location of Puerto Rico
- Coordinates: 18°05′36″N 66°50′23″W
- Commonwealth: Puerto Rico
- Municipality: Yauco

Area
  - Total: 3.32 sq mi (8.6 km^{2})
  - Land: 3.31 sq mi (8.6 km^{2})
  - Water: 0.01 sq mi (0.026 km^{2})
- Elevation: 1,394 ft (425 m)

Population (2010)
  - Total: 1,108
  - Density: 335.8/sq mi (129.7/km^{2})
- Source: 2010 Census
- Time zone: UTC−4 (AST)
- ZIP Code: 00698
- Area code: 787/939

Duey is a barrio in the municipality of Yauco, Puerto Rico. According to the 2010 Census, it had a population of 1,108 inhabitants and a population density of 129.21 people per km².

== Geography ==
Duey is located at the coordinates 18°5′36″N 66°50′23″W. According to the United States Census Bureau, Duey has a total area of 8.58 km², of which 8.56 km² is land and 0.02 km² (0.18%) is water.

== History ==
Duey was in Spain's gazetteers until Puerto Rico was ceded by Spain in the aftermath of the Spanish–American War under the terms of the Treaty of Paris of 1898 and became an unincorporated territory of the United States. In 1899, the United States Department of War conducted a census of Puerto Rico finding that the population of Duey barrio was 1,264.

Historical population
Census	Pop.	Note	%±
1900	1,264		—
1910	1,231		−2.6%
1920	1,418		15.2%
1930	1,348		−4.9%
1940	1,439		6.8%
1950	1,538		6.9%
1960	1,676		9.0%
1970	1,425		−15.0%
1980	1,263		−11.4%
1990	1,328		5.1%
2000	1,412		6.3%
2010	1,108		−21.5%
U.S. Decennial Census; 1899 (shown as 1900) 1910-1930; 1930-1950 1980-2000 2010

== Notable people ==
- Ariel Castro, notable criminal kidnapper and rapist

== See also ==
- List of communities in Puerto Rico
