= Puerto Rico Highway 132 =

Highway in Puerto Rico

Highway 132
- Ruta 132

Route information
- Maintained by Puerto Rico DTPW
- Length: 26.0 km (16.2 mi)
- Existed: 1953–present

Major junctions
- West end: PR-2 / PR-136 in Jaguas
- PR-378 in Macaná; PR-3382 in Macaná–Barrero; PR-3131 in Barrero; PR-386 / PR-3132 in Coto; PR-385 in Cuebas; PR-391 in Tallaboa Alta; PR-549 in Canas; PR-502 in Canas; PR-9 in Canas–Canas Urbano; PR-500 in Canas Urbano
- East end: PR-123 in Canas Urbano

Location
- Country: United States
- Territory: Puerto Rico
- Municipalities: Guayanilla, Peñuelas, Ponce

Highway system
- Roads in Puerto Rico; List
| ← PR-131 | → PR-133 |
| ← PR-3131 | PR-3132 | → PR-3301 |

Puerto Rico Highway 132 (PR-132) is a secondary highway that connects the town of Guayanilla to the city of Ponce, Puerto Rico. The road runs through the town of Peñuelas before reaching Ponce. In Ponce, PR-132 starts where Calle Villa ends.

== Route description ==
Puerto Rico Highway 132 begins at its interchange with PR-2 and PR-136 in Jaguas, a barrio located near downtown Guayanilla. The route continues east through Macaná and Borrero barrios before entering Peñuelas. In Peñuelas, PR-132 crosses through Macaná, Santo Domingo and Coto barrios before downtown Peñuelas. After downtown area, the highway continues to Ponce through Cuebas and Tallaboa Alta, and enters Ponce through Canas until its eastern end at PR-123 in Canas Urbano.

== History ==
The highway resulted from the old road connecting Ponce to Peñuelas via Barrio Canas.

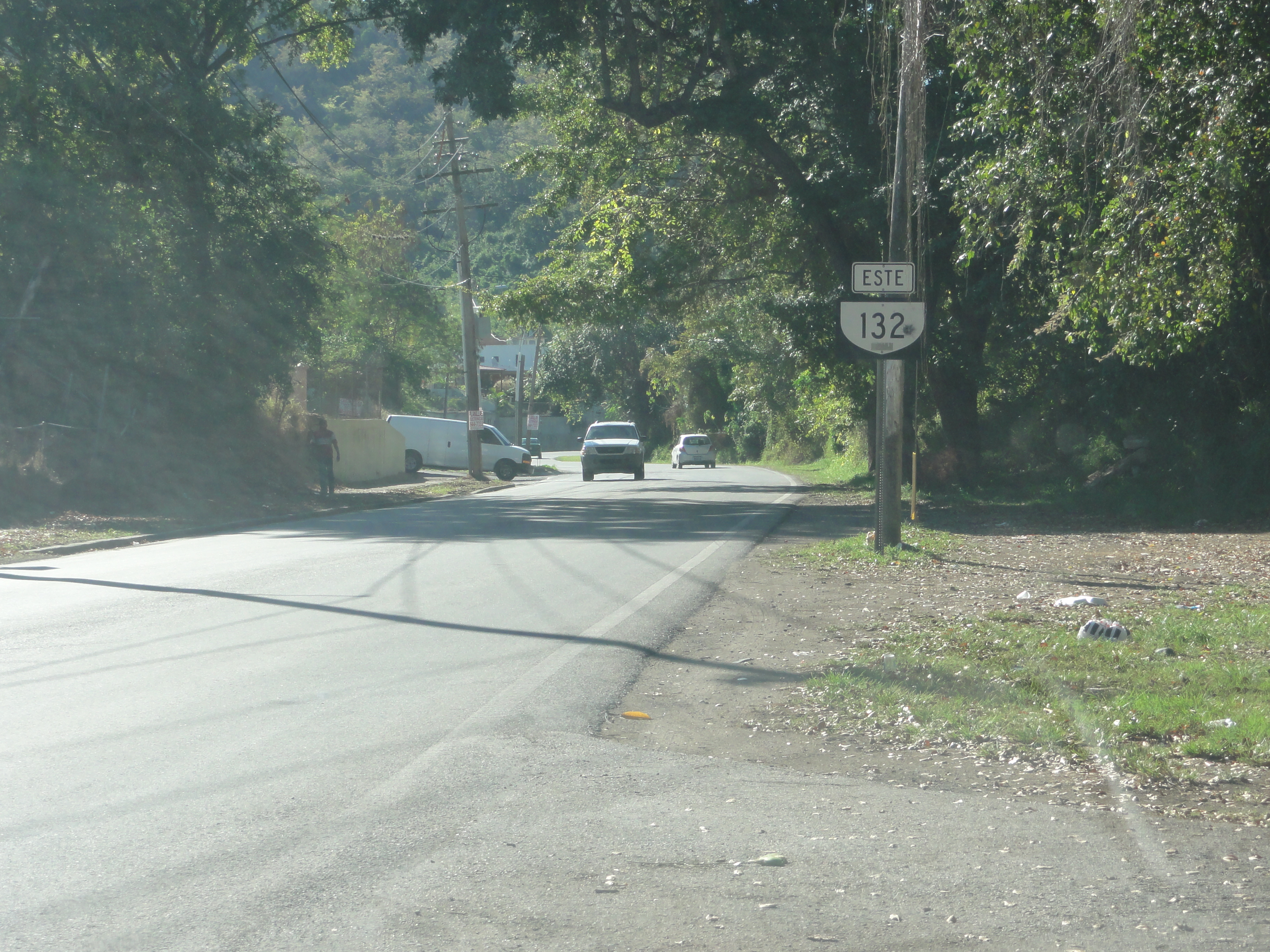
A segment of PR-132, in Ponce, Puerto Rico, heading from Peñuelas to Ponce

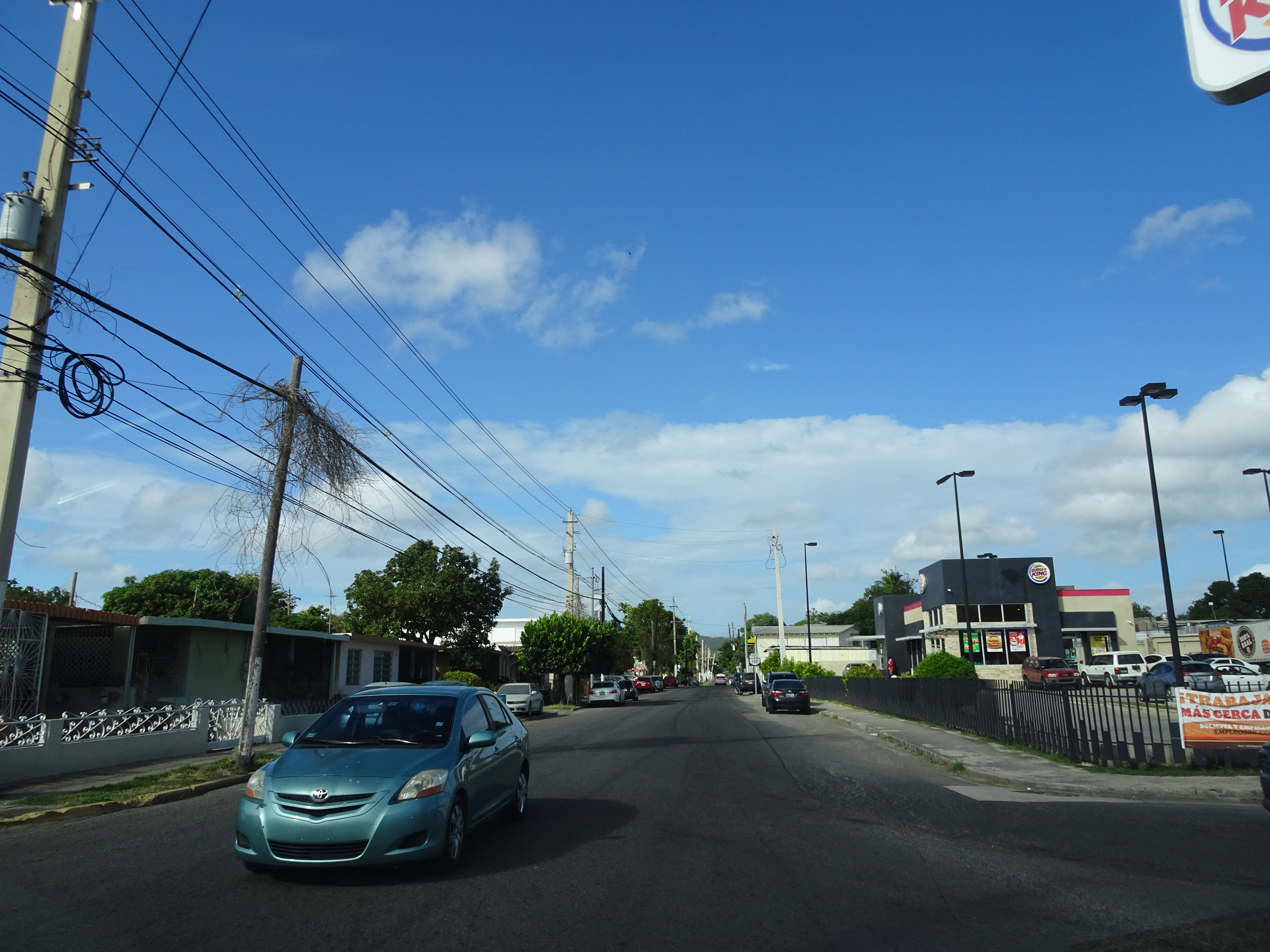
PR-132 west in Barrio Canas Urbano

== Future ==
In August 2011, a bill was introduced in the Puerto Rico Senate to build a new highway that would take over some of the traffic currently on PR-132. The new road may start off at PR-500 and connect to PR-127. The proposed road would also take over some of the traffic currently on PR-2.

== Major intersections ==
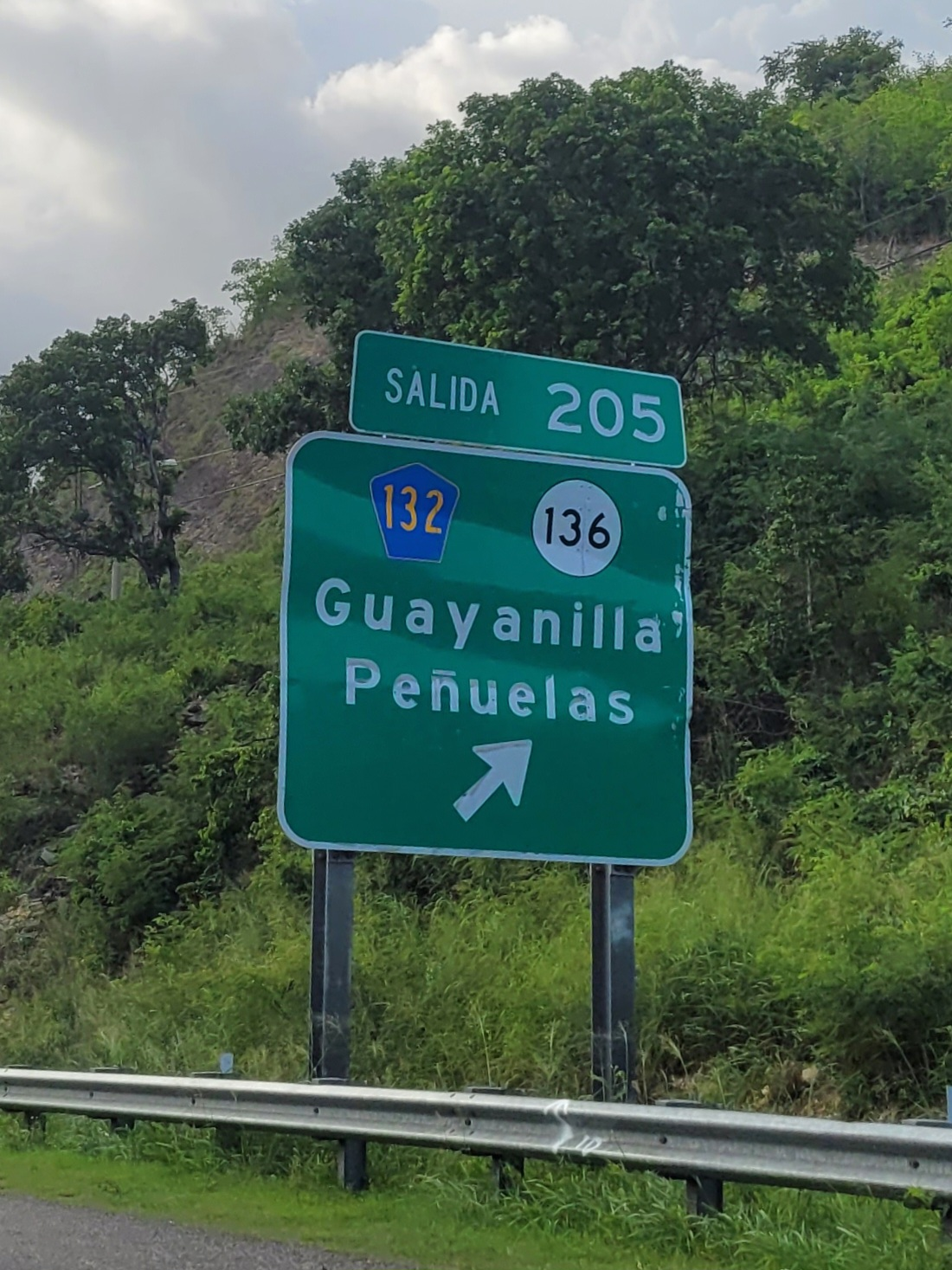
PR-2 west at exit 205 to PR-132 east and PR-136 south between Magas and Jaguas barrios, Guayanilla

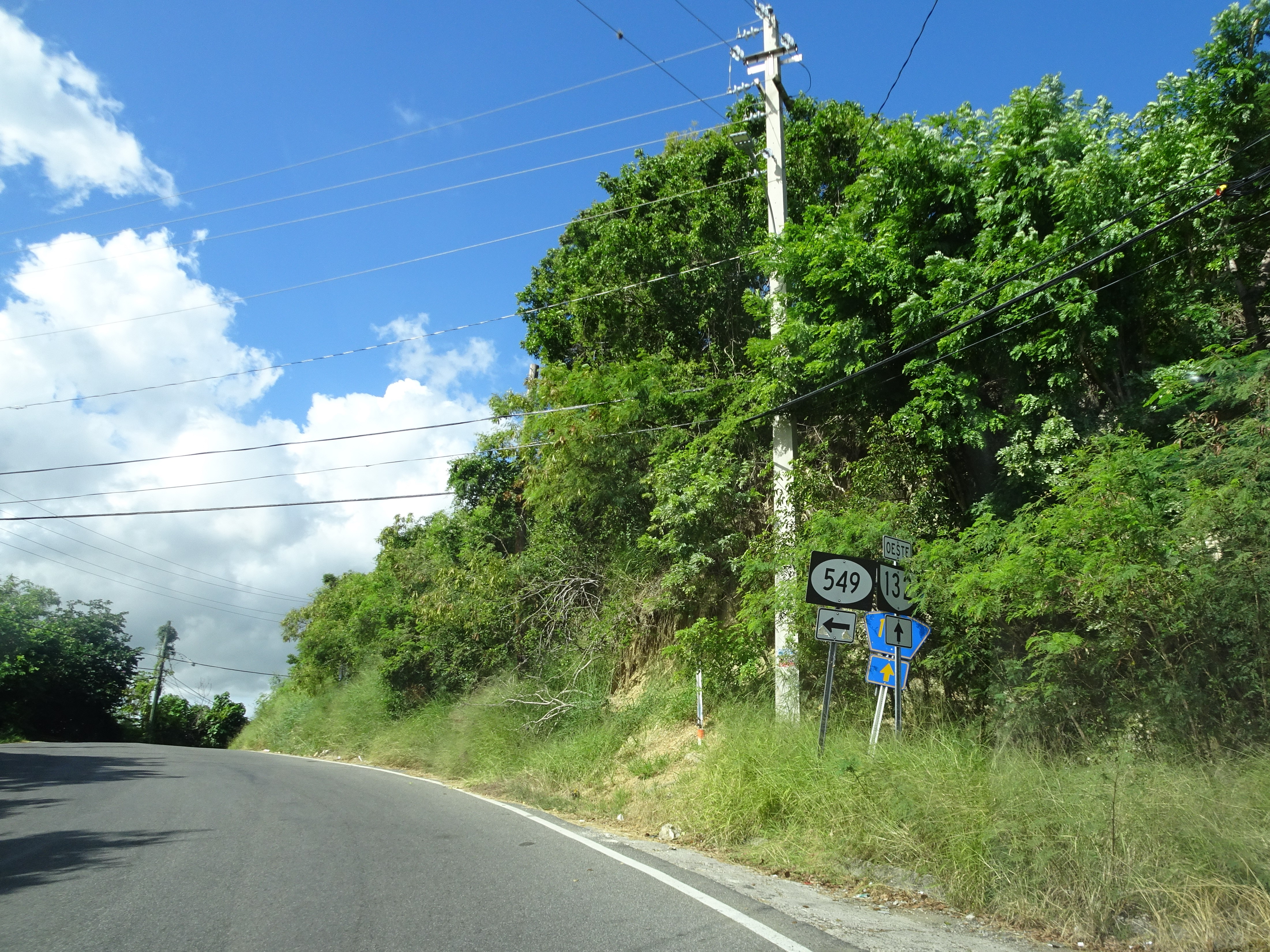
PR-132 west at PR-549 intersection in Canas, Ponce

| Municipality | Location | km | mi | Destinations | Notes |
|---|---|---|---|---|---|
| Guayanilla | Jaguas | 0.0 | 0.0 | PR-136 (Avenida Pedro Albizu Campos) – Guayanilla | Continuation beyond PR-2 |
| Guayanilla | Jaguas | 0.0 | 0.0 | PR-2 (Expreso Roberto Sánchez Vilella) – Ponce, Mayagüez | Western terminus of PR-132 and northern terminus of PR-136; PR-2 exit 205; diamond interchange |
| Guayanilla | Macaná | 3.4 | 2.1 | PR-378 – Macaná | |
| Guayanilla | Macaná–Barrero line | 4.5 | 2.8 | PR-3382 – Barrero | |
| Guayanilla | Barrero | 5.1 | 3.2 | PR-3131 – Macaná | |
| Río Macaná | | 5.1 | 3.2 | Puente Alonso | |
| Peñuelas | Coto | 10.3 | 6.4 | PR-386 / PR-3132 south – Peñuelas, Jaguas | |
| Peñuelas | Peñuelas barrio-pueblo | 11.3 | 7.0 | PR-3384 (Calle Pedro Velázquez Díaz) – Coto | |
| Peñuelas | Coto | 12.1 | 7.5 | PR-3132 north – Coto | Unbuilt |
| Peñuelas | Cuebas | 12.4 | 7.7 | PR-385 south (Desvío Ángel Miguel Candelario Arce) – Cuebas | |
| Peñuelas | Tallaboa Alta | 14.9 | 9.3 | PR-391 – Tallaboa Alta | |
| Ponce | Canas | 19.2– 19.3 | 11.9– 12.0 | PR-549 – Canas | |
| Ponce | Canas | 21.5 | 13.4 | PR-502 – Quebrada Limón | |
| Ponce | Canas–Canas Urbano line | 24.2– 24.3 | 15.0– 15.1 | PR-9 (Ronda de Circunvalación Roman Baldorioty de Castro) – Ponce, Adjuntas | Under construction; diamond interchange |
| Ponce | Canas Urbano | 25.4 | 15.8 | PR-500 – Canas | |
| Ponce | Canas Urbano | 26.0 | 16.2 | PR-123 – Ponce, Adjuntas | Eastern terminus of PR-132 |
1.000 mi = 1.609 km; 1.000 km = 0.621 mi: Unopened

== Related route ==
Highway 3132
- Location: Peñuelas
- Length: 2.3 km (1.4 mi)

Puerto Rico Highway 3132 (PR-3132) is a north–south bypass located west of downtown Peñuelas that is currently under construction. When completed, this highway will extends from its intersection with PR-132 and PR-386 until its end at PR-132 near PR-385. The entire route is located in Coto, Peñuelas.

| km | mi | Destinations | Notes |
|---|---|---|---|
| 2.3 | 1.4 | PR-132 – Peñuelas, Ponce | Future southern terminus of PR-3132 |
Temporary gap in PR-3132
| 1.3 | 0.81 | PR-3384 (Calle Pedro Velázquez Díaz) – Peñuelas | Temporary southern terminus of PR-3132 |
| 0.0 | 0.0 | PR-132 – Peñuelas, Guayanilla | Northern terminus of PR-3132 and southern terminus of PR-386 |
| 0.0 | 0.0 | PR-386 – Jaguas | Continuation beyond PR-132 |
1.000 mi = 1.609 km; 1.000 km = 0.621 mi: Unopened

== See also ==
- List of highways in Ponce, Puerto Rico
- List of streets in Ponce, Puerto Rico
- 1953 Puerto Rico highway renumbering
