= Macaná =

Macaná may refer to:

== Places ==
- Macaná, Guayanilla, Puerto Rico, a barrio
- Macaná, Peñuelas, Puerto Rico, a barrio
