= Puerto Rico Highway 385 =

Highway in Puerto Rico

Highway 385
- Ruta 385
- Desvío Ángel Miguel Candelario Arce

Route information
- Maintained by Puerto Rico DTPW
- Length: 5.30 km (3.29 mi)
- Existed: 1953–present

Major junctions
- South end: PR-127 in Encarnación–Tallaboa Poniente
- PR-2 in Tallaboa Saliente; PR-384 in Tallaboa Saliente; PR-390 in Cuebas
- North end: PR-132 in Cuebas

Location
- Country: United States
- Territory: Puerto Rico
- Municipalities: Peñuelas

Highway system
- Roads in Puerto Rico; List
← PR-366	→ PR-413

Puerto Rico Highway 385 (PR-385) is a tertiary state highway in Peñuelas, Puerto Rico. At its northern terminus it connects with PR-132, in the town of Peñuelas, and at its southern terminus it connects to PR-2, near the Caribbean Sea. Both terminus and the entire length of the road are all within the municipality of Peñuelas.

== Major intersections ==
The entire route is located in Peñuelas.

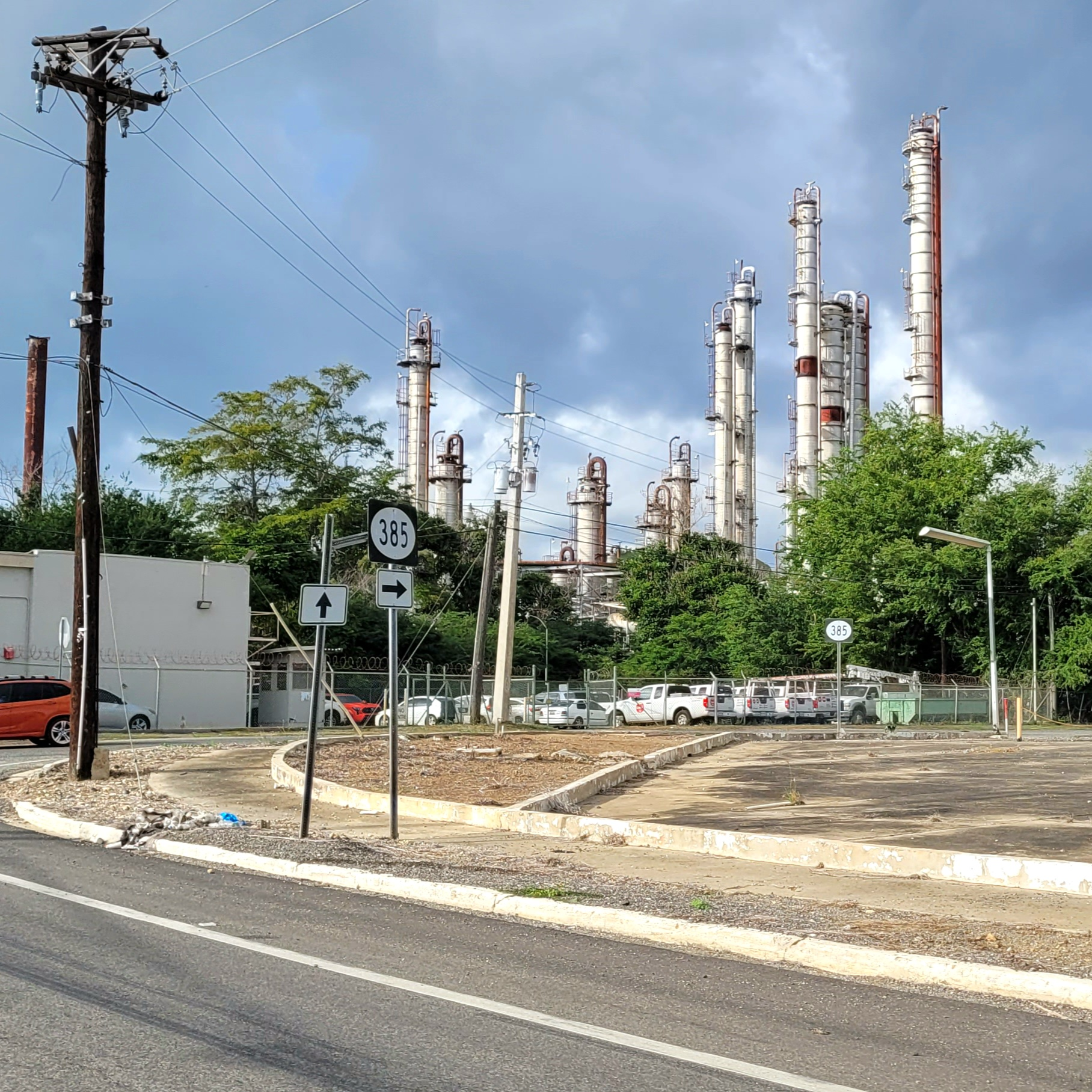
PR-127 west at PR-385 intersection between Encarnación and Tallaboa Poniente barrios

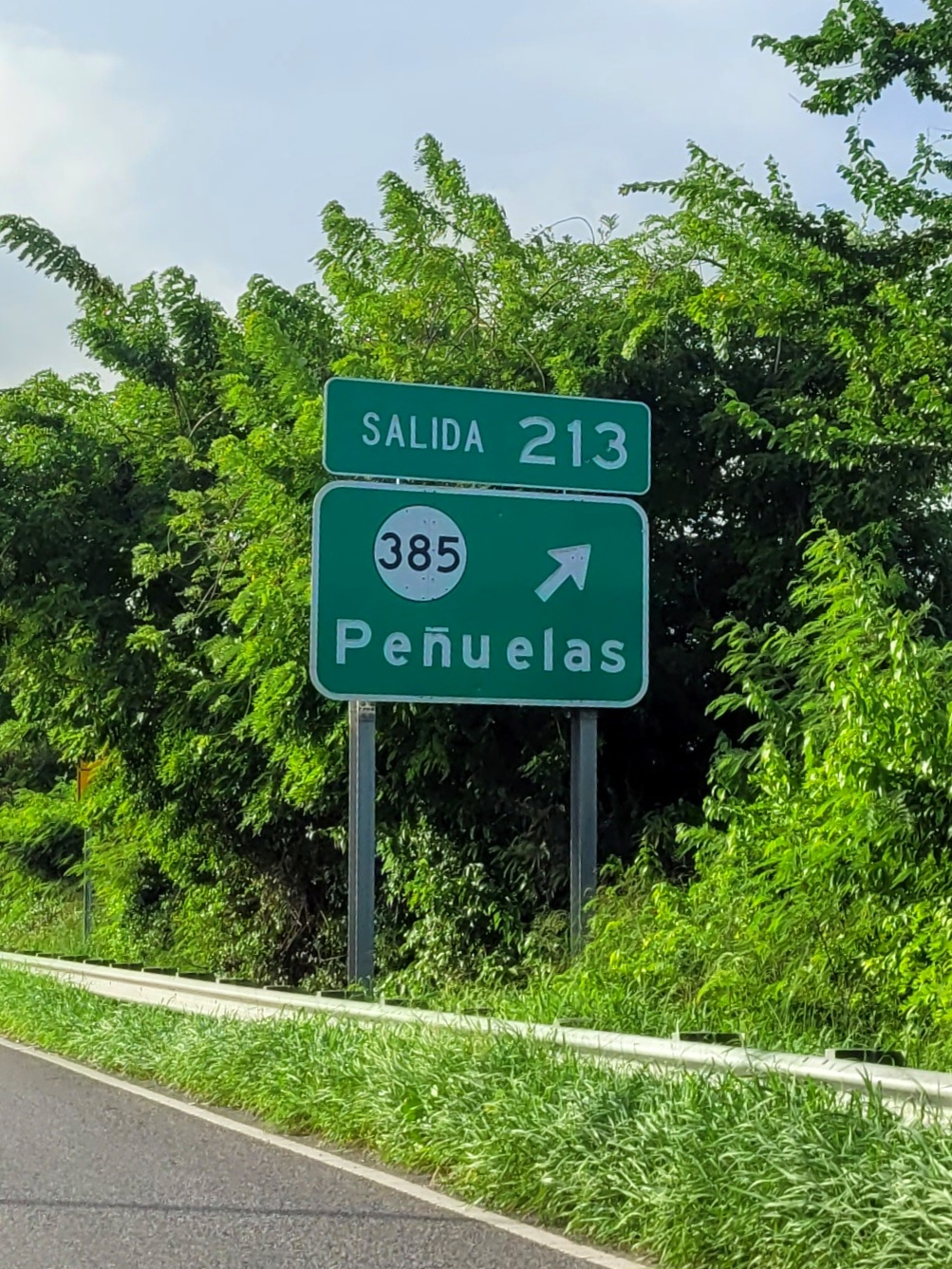
PR-2 west at exit 213 to PR-385 in Tallaboa Saliente barrio

Location	km	mi	Destinations	Notes
Encarnación–Tallaboa Poniente line	5.30	3.29	PR-127 – Ponce, Guayanilla	Southern terminus of PR-385
Tallaboa Saliente	4.7– 4.5	2.9– 2.8	PR-2 (Expreso Roberto Sánchez Vilella) – Ponce, Guayanilla	PR-2 exit 213; partial cloverleaf interchange
Tallaboa Saliente	2.5	1.6	PR-384 – Tallaboa Poniente	
Cuebas	0.4	0.25	PR-390 – Cuebas	
Cuebas	0.0	0.0	PR-132 – Peñuelas, Ponce	Northern terminus end of PR-385
1.000 mi = 1.609 km; 1.000 km = 0.621 mi

== See also ==
- 1953 Puerto Rico highway renumbering
