= Barrero =

Barrero may refer to:

== People ==
- Emilio Muñoz Barrero (born 1979), Spanish footballer
- Hilario Barrero (born 1948), Spanish writer, translator, professor and poet
- Jesús Barrero (1958–2016), Mexican actor and voice actor
- José Barrero (born 1998), Cuban baseball player
- Juan Pablo Barrero (1900–1966), Spanish footballer and lawyer
- Marco Antonio Barrero (born 1962), Bolivian footballer
- Pablo Ruiz Barrero (born 1981), Spanish footballer

== Places ==
- Barrero, Guayanilla, Puerto Rico, a barrio
- Barrero, Rincón, Puerto Rico, a barrio
- Barrero Grande, a former name of Eusebio Ayala, Paraguay
