= Puerto Rico Highway 549 =

Highway in Puerto Rico

Highway 549
- Ruta 549

Route information
- Maintained by Puerto Rico DTPW
- Length: 3.3 km (2.1 mi)

Major junctions
- South end: Sector Ranchete in Canas
- North end: PR-132 in Canas

Location
- Country: United States
- Territory: Puerto Rico
- Municipalities: Ponce

Highway system
- Roads in Puerto Rico; List
| ← PR-538 | → PR-567 |

Puerto Rico Highway 549 (PR-549) is a tertiary state road in Ponce, Puerto Rico. The road has both of its endpoints, as well as all of its length, entirely within Barrio Canas in the municipality of Ponce. The road is a country road that runs north to south, entirely in the western portion of Barrio Canas. Its southern terminus is at a dirt path that leads to the westernmost endpoint of PR-500 in Barrio Canas and its northern end is at PR-132 also in Barrio Canas.

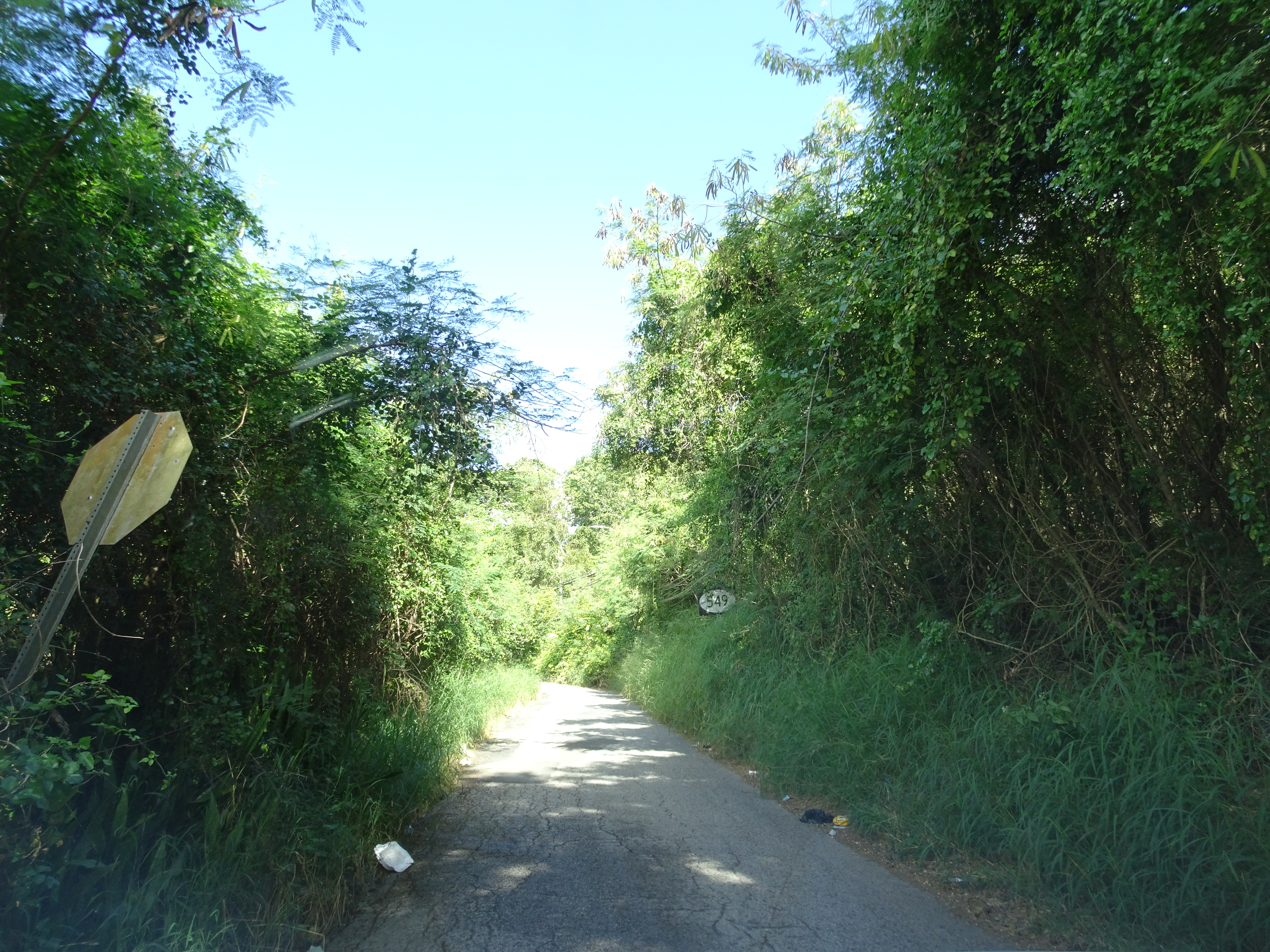
Puerto Rico Highway 549 looking south

== Major intersections ==
The entire route is located in Canas, Ponce.

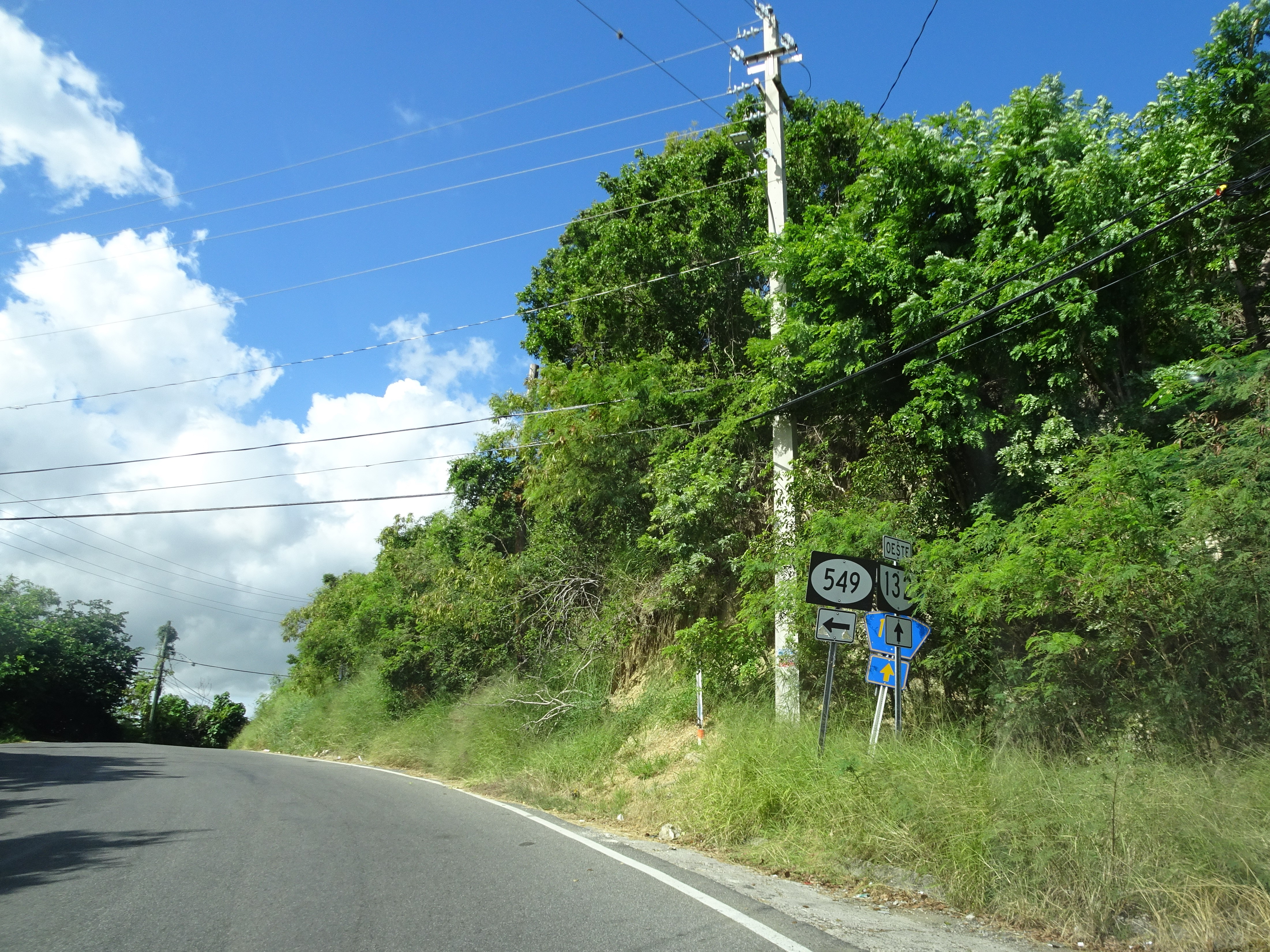
PR-132 west at its junction with PR-549

| km | mi | Destinations | Notes |
|---|---|---|---|
| 3.3 | 2.1 | Southern terminus of PR-549 at Sector Ranchete; a dirt path leads to PR-500 | |
| 0.0 | 0.0 | PR-132 – Ponce, Peñuelas | Northern terminus of PR-549 |
1.000 mi = 1.609 km; 1.000 km = 0.621 mi

== See also ==
- List of highways in Ponce, Puerto Rico
