= Puerto Rico Highway 500 =

Highway in Puerto Rico

Highway 500
- Ruta 500

Route information
- Maintained by Puerto Rico DTPW
- Length: 2.9 km (1.8 mi)

Major junctions
- West end: Sector La Cotorra in Canas
- PR-9 in Canas; PR-163 in Canas Urbano
- East end: PR-132 in Canas Urbano

Location
- Country: United States
- Territory: Puerto Rico
- Municipalities: Ponce

Highway system
- Roads in Puerto Rico; List
← PR-487	→ PR-501

Puerto Rico Highway 500 (PR-500) is a tertiary road in Ponce, Puerto Rico. The highway has both of its endpoints, as well as all of its length, entirely within the Ponce city limits. It runs east to west.

== Route description ==
The road has its eastern terminus at PR-132 (Calle Villa), in Barrio Canas Urbano, and its western terminus in Barrio Canas. A one-lane dirt road leads to PR-549 from there. The only major road PR-500 intersects is Avenida Baramaya (PR-9), at km 0.8. Prior to that, at km 0.3, PR-500 connects to PR-163 (Avenida Las Américas). The road ends at km 2.3, where the Vertedero Municipal de Ponce (Ponce's Municipal Waste Yard) is located. From km 2.3 an unmarked dirt road leads to PR-549, which leads to barrio Quebrada Limón in the western portion of the municipality of Ponce.

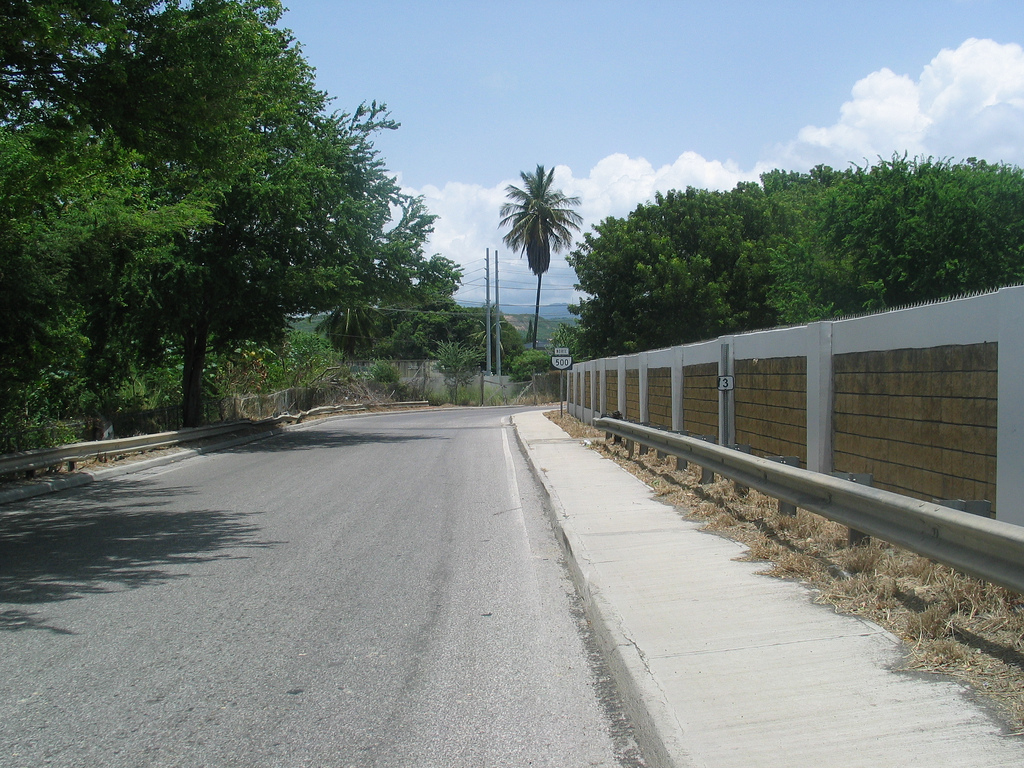
A stretch of Puerto Rico Highway 500 heading north near PR-163 in Barrio Canas

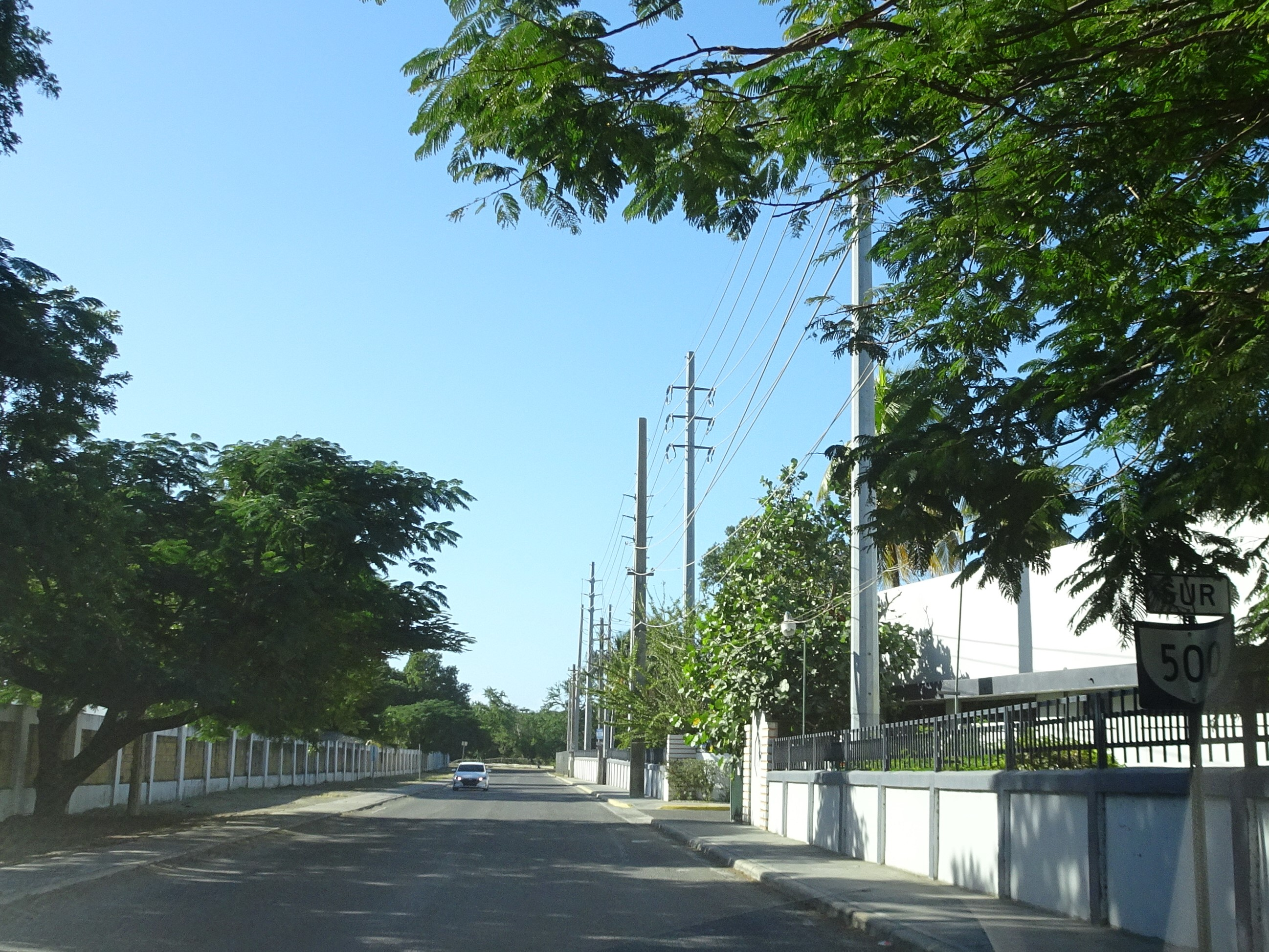
A stretch of PR-500 heading south in Barrio Canas

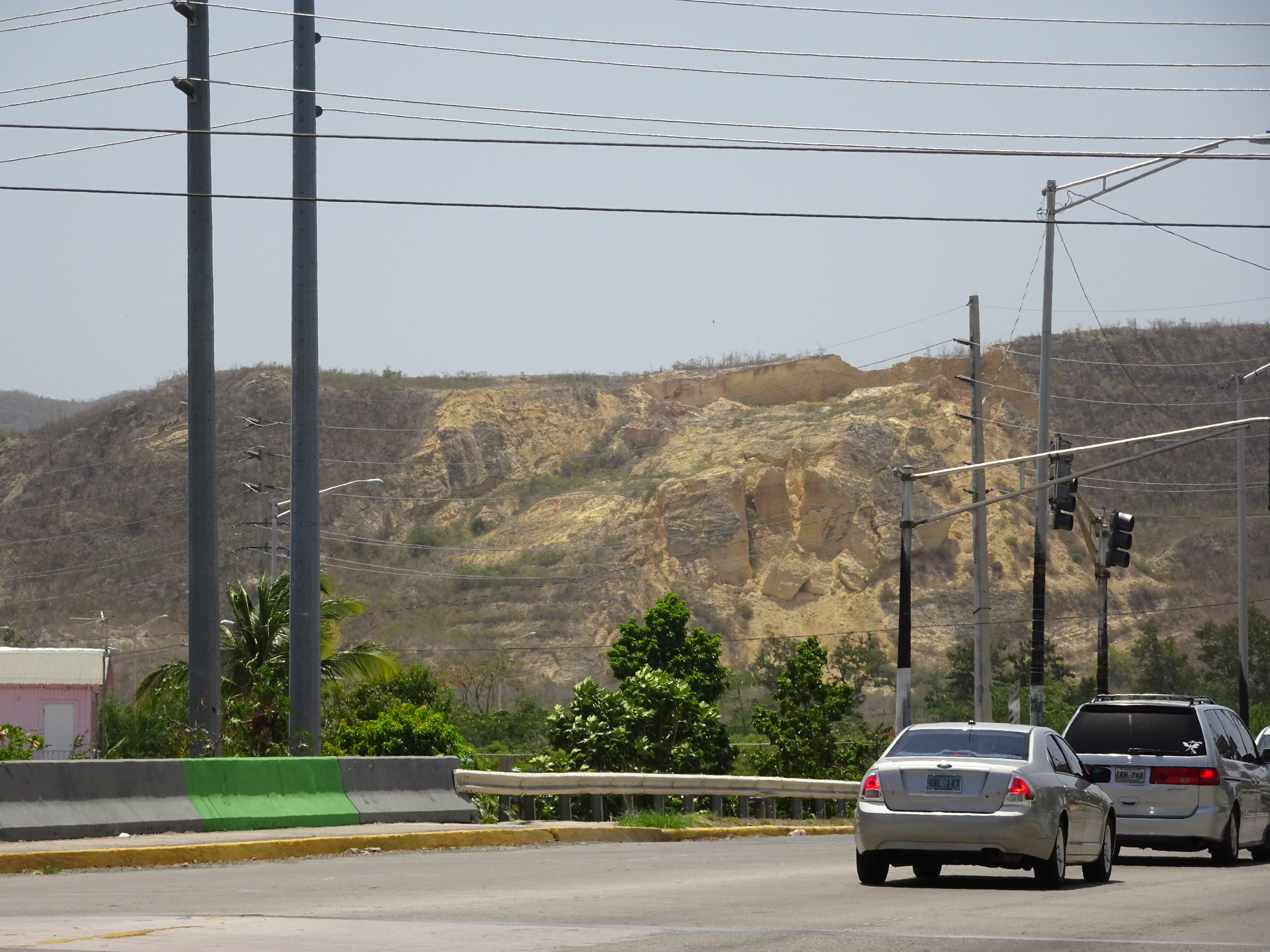
Western terminus of PR-163 at PR-500 junction in Barrio Canas Urbano, looking west

In the 2000s decade, PR-500 was no longer transited by the oversized Ponce Cement (now CEMEX) trucks. Highway 500 is about one and one-half miles long, making one of the shortest highways in Puerto Rico. It is lined by residential areas with a short section lined by the Calle Villa Final industrial park, a light-industry industrial park.

In August 2011, Senator Larry Seilhamer Rodríguez presented a bill into the Puerto Rico Senate that would extend PR-500 westward to connect with PR-2 in the area Guayanilla.

== History ==
The highway is a wide two-way roadway originally designed to accommodate the oversized trucks used by the Ponce Cement, Inc. plant in barrio Magueyes, on road PR-123. The trucks were used to transport limestone soil from the northern slopes of the western barrio Canas hills, near barrio Tallaboa in Peñuelas to the cement plant on PR-123. The road runs from its eastern terminus at PR-132 (Calle Villa), which is the road leading from Guayanilla to Ponce through Peñuelas, to its western terminus at Barrio Canas where it ends at the Ponce Municipal Waste and Recycling Yard.

== Major intersections ==
The entire route is located in Ponce.

Location	km	mi	Destinations	Notes
Canas	2.9	1.8	Western terminus of PR-500 at Sector La Cotorra; a dirt path leads to PR-549	
Canas	1.1– 1.0	0.68– 0.62	PR-9 (Avenida Baramaya) – Ponce, Guayanilla	Incomplete diamond interchange
Canas Urbano	0.4	0.25	PR-163 east (Avenida Las Américas) – Ponce	
Canas Urbano	0.0	0.0	PR-132 (Calle Villa) – Ponce, Peñuelas	Eastern terminus of PR-500
1.000 mi = 1.609 km; 1.000 km = 0.621 mi

== See also ==
- List of highways in Ponce, Puerto Rico
