= Puerto Rico Highway 9 =

Highway 9
- Ruta 9
- Anillo de Circunvalación de Ponce

Route information
- Maintained by Puerto Rico DTPW
- Length: 7.27 km (4.52 mi)
- Existed: 2006–present

Major junctions
- South end: PR-52 in Canas
- PR-2 in Canas; PR-500 in Canas; PR-132 in Canas Urbano–Canas; PR-123 in Magueyes Urbano
- North end: PR-10 in Portugués

Location
- Country: United States
- Territory: Puerto Rico
- Municipalities: Ponce

Highway system
- Roads in Puerto Rico; List
← PR-8	→ PR-10

Puerto Rico Highway 9 (PR-9), also called the Anillo de Circunvalación de Ponce (Ponce's Circumferential Highway), is a limited-access state highway located entirely within the limits of the municipality of Ponce, Puerto Rico, and connecting Puerto Rico Highway 10 in Barrio Portugués in the north to Puerto Rico Highway 52 in barrio Canas in the south, crossing Barrio Magueyes. The Oficina de Ordenación Territorial (Office of Territorial Ordering) of the Autonomous Municipality of Ponce calls this road Ronda de Circunvalación Román Baldorioty de Castro (Román Baldorioty de Castro Beltway). The roadway is still under construction.

== Route description ==
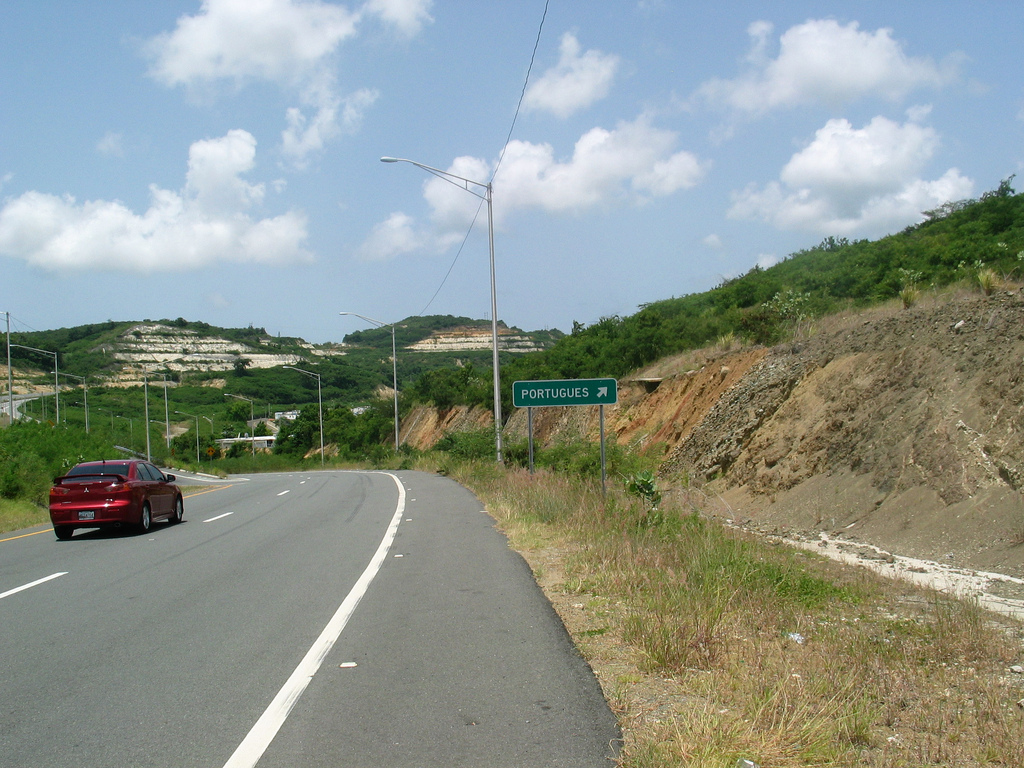
PR-9 near Barrio Portugués Rural exit in Ponce, heading west towards PR-123

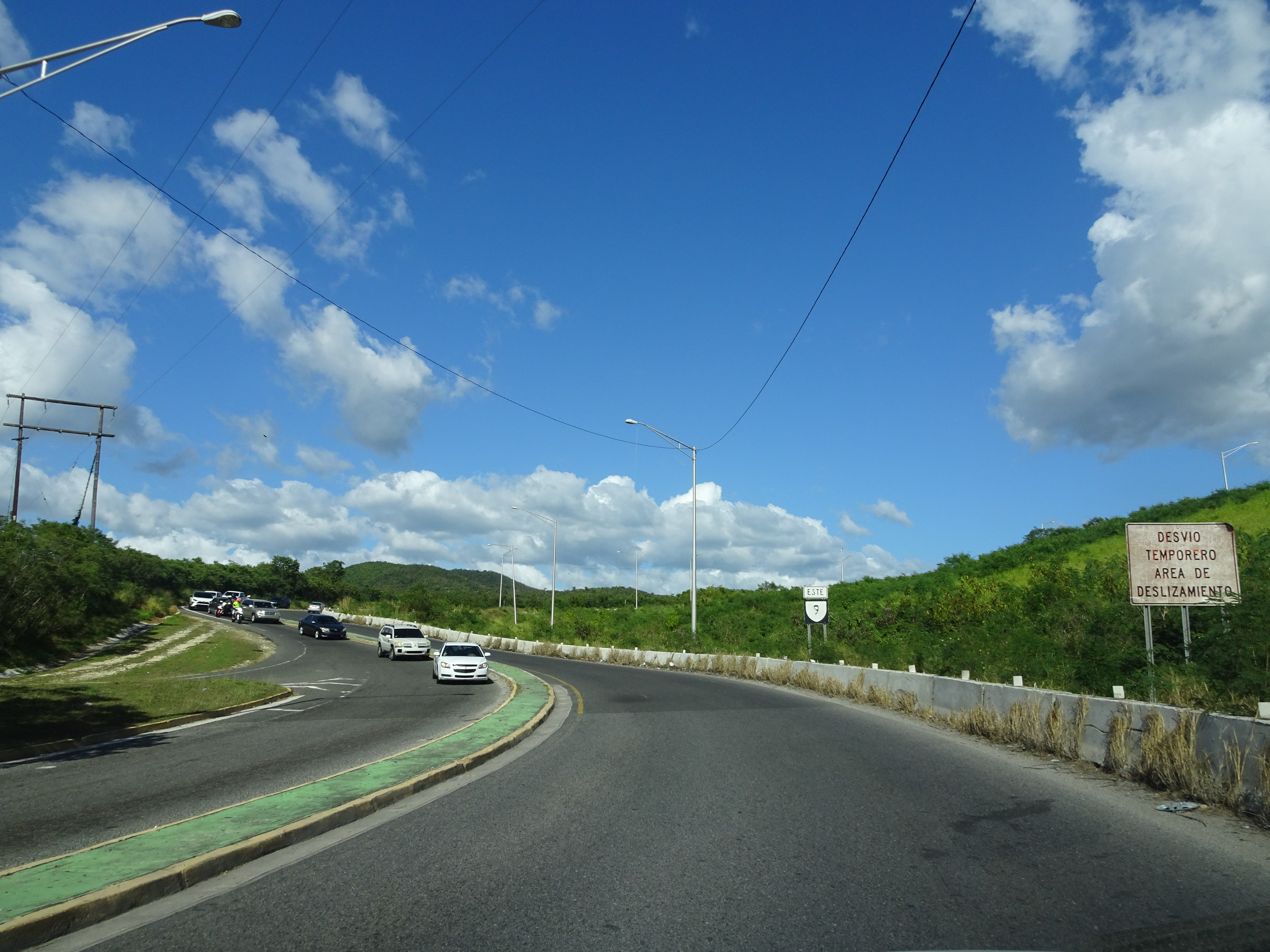
PR-9 east in Barrio Magueyes

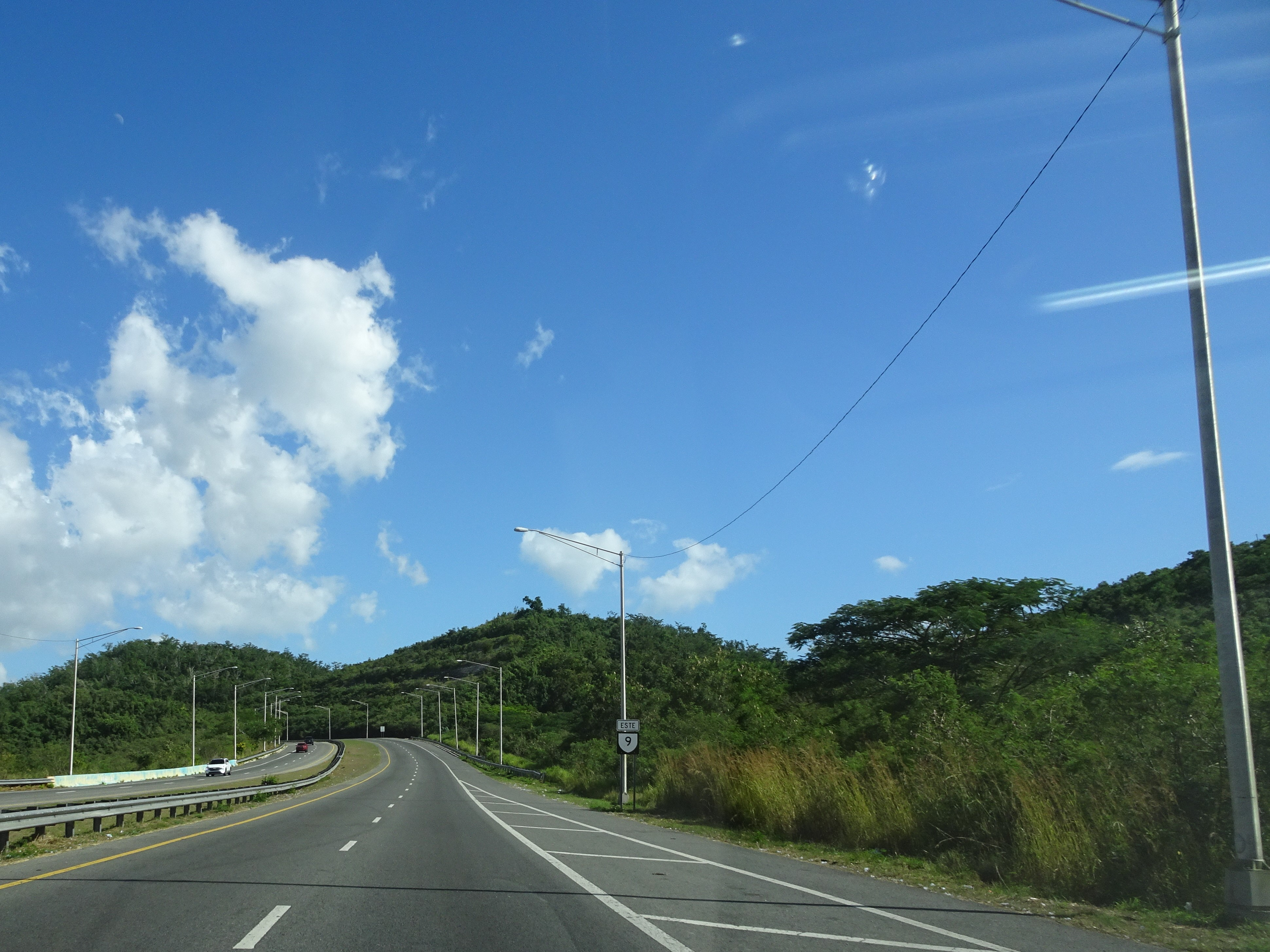
PR-9 east in Barrio Magueyes

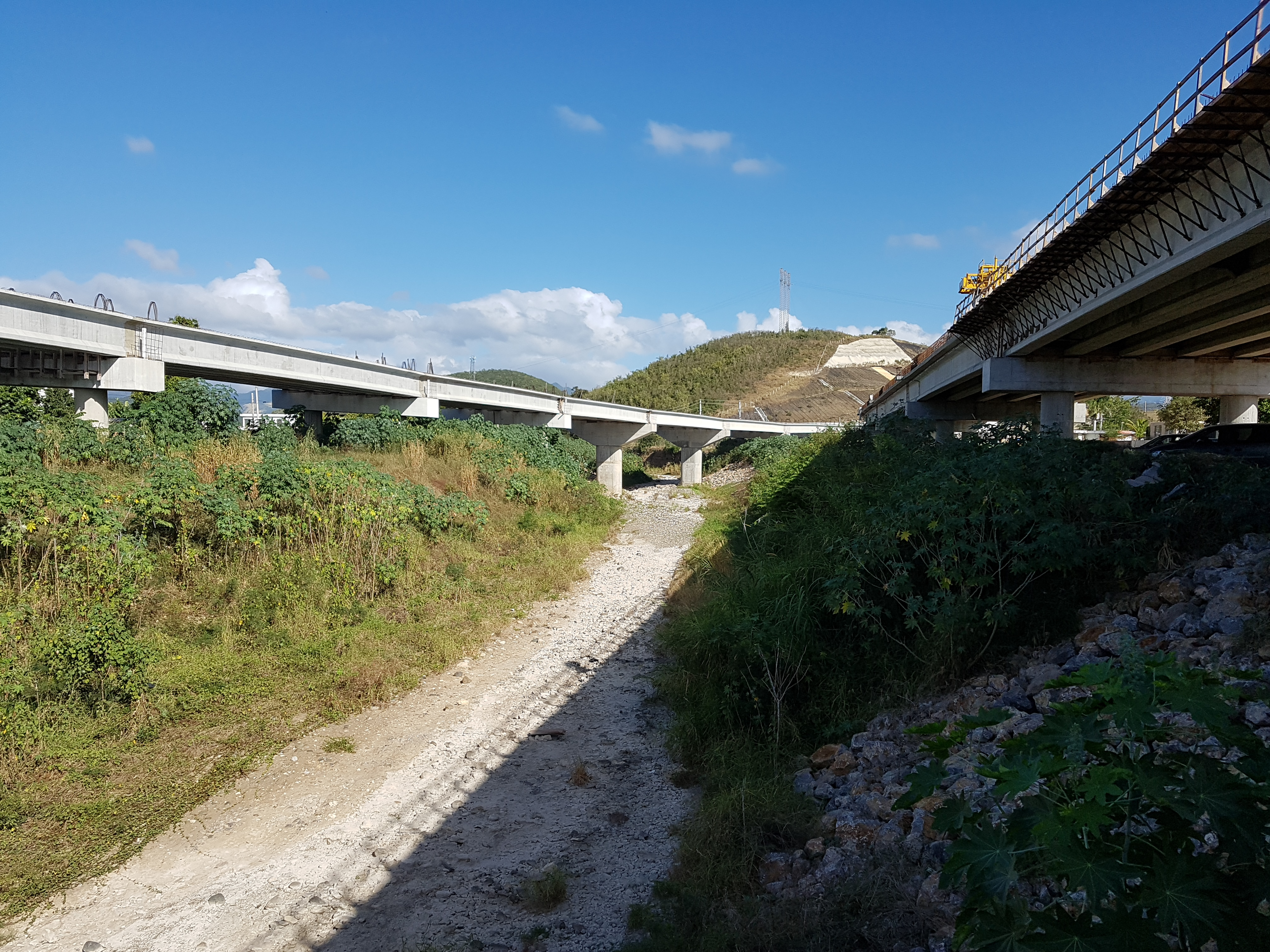
PR-9 in Barrio Canas under construction in early 2019

PR-9 is still partly under construction. The construction work has thus far (November 2019) yielded the extreme northern segment and a portion of the southern segment, with the middle segments still to be built. The road currently runs mostly northwest of the city as well as small portion southwest of the city. The western segment is still being built. This last segment has a length of 4.23 kilometers.

When completed, it will have the effect of creating a beltway around the city, given that PR-9 connects with PR-10 at its northern extreme, and PR-10 already borders the city around its northern, northeastern, and part of the city's eastern edges. This beltway will have junctions with all major city highways: from PR-52 and PR-2 west of Ponce, to PR-52 and PR-1 east of Ponce.

=== Construction ===
The building of PR-9 is taking place in several phases. Phase I, already completed, consisted of the stretch of the road from PR-10 in Barrio Portugués to PR-123 in Barrio Magueyes.

Phase II consists of the stretch between PR-123 at Barrio Magueyes to PR-132 in Barrio Canas. As of 18 August 2010, the Phase II stretch was in the planning phase according to Puerto Rico's Commissioner of Transportation and Public Works, Rubén A. Hernández Gregorat. Phase II is expected to cost $28 million. The length of this section is 2.61 kilometers. It includes three bridges: one will cross Río Canas, a second bridge will be an overpass for PR-123, and a third bridge will cross the access ramp to PR-123.

Phase III of PR-9 will run from PR-132 in Canas to PR-163 (with a connection to Avenida Las Américas) in barrio Canas Urbano. It is expected to cost some $36 million. This section will have a length of 1.62 kilometers, and will also require three bridges: One will be an overpass to Avenida Las Américas at PR-163, another will be crossing Río Pastillo, and the third will cross PR-132.

The fourth and last portion of this project, Phase IV will consist of a stretch between PR-163 (intersection with PR-500) and PR-2 via improvements to the existing 4-lane Avenida Baramaya roadway.

Completion of this last phase will make it possible to circumvent city traffic altogether by providing a loop around the city of Ponce for motorists wishing access to areas north and northeast of the city from PR-2 in the El Tuque sector of barrio Canas. It will, for example, be possible to travel from Mayagüez to Adjuntas without the need to travel on the eastern segment of PR-10 near Mercedita Airport, which is currently (July 2017) the case.

== History ==
PR-9 is being built in three phases. (Note: The ACT also calls them "sections".) The three sections, PR-10 to PR-123, PR-123 to PR-132, and PR-132 to PR-163 correspond to the three phases. Once a phase is completed, the corresponding section is put into service and is opened to traffic. For construction purposes, each section was further divided into segments.

=== Phase I ===
On 13 October 2000, governor Pedro Rossello inaugurated the last segment needed for connecting the section linking PR-10, in barrio Portugues, to PR-123, (Note: PR-123 was signed as "PR-10" in this area until the opening of a new road that adopted the PR-10 designation and which, like PR-123, runs from Ponce to Arecibo.) in barrio Magueyes, and consisting of 7.27 km, at a cost of $22 million.

=== Phase II ===
This phase started in September 2012, and it was originally scheduled for completion by December 2015.

In December 2013, the section from PR-123 to PR-132 (known as Autoridad de Carreteras (AC)'s project number 000911) was projected for a 2014-2018 budget cost of almost $30 million. Various adjustments increased the original $30M cost to some $38.5M from 2012 to 2017. Additional 2017 delays were incurred after three landslide that occurred in the summer of 2017, requiring new analysis work to discover the causes plus the required additional design follow-up work to correct the discovered faults.

By November 2019, it was reported the cost of this phase had increased to $56.5 million, "almost $20 million over the originally budgeted amount," much of this increased cost resulting from heavy damage by the 20 October 2017 Hurricane Maria, and a new end-of-work projected date of December 2021 was forecast.

In January 2020, after the 7 January 2020 earthquake, the regional director of the Autoridad de Carreteras y Transportación stated that this section under construction had sustained damages from the quakes, and that its completion, which was already 49 months behind schedule, would now not be ready until December 2021 "at the earliest".

=== Phase III ===
In October 2012, the Puerto Rico Department of Transportation and Public Works revealed that the last track of PR-9, one that would connect PR-10 to PR-52 and consisting of 2.6 kilometers, (Note: A November 2019 news report stated phase III consisted of 1.62 kilometers of roadway. The apparent inconsistency may be that the 2.6 km refers to both, phases 2 and 3. This phase II, then, would be 2.6 km - 1.62 km, or 0.98 km.) was soon to commence construction at a cost of $46 million.

Construction of PR-9 from Avenida Las Américas (PR-163) to PR-132 was AC's # 000915 and estimated at $40,325,706. In February 2015, the section from PR-123 to PR-132 was initially projected to cost $38.5 million and was planned to be ready in 2016. Project overruns, due to landslides and other unexpected factors, increased the cost of this section from $38.5 million to $41.7 million, and pushed the schedule opening date to February 2018.

Also in February 2015, the last section of the road which would connect PR-132 with PR-163 (Avenida Las Américas), Avenida Baramaya, and PR-52, was planned to be built at a cost of $45 million. As of February 2014, this final section was scheduled for completion by early 2018.

In May 2019, however, it was revealed by ACT that the project failed to meet the 2018 date due severe damaged caused by the September 2017 Hurricane Maria. The new projected opening date of one of the final sections of the road was moved to September 2020, and completion of the entire project was being projected for sometime in 2021.

In November 2019, it was reported that 75% of the work required for Phase III had been completed and an estimated opening date of September 2020 was being anticipated. This phase has a length of 1.62 kilometers, and was being built at a cost of $46 million.

In January 2020, after the 7 January 2020 earthquake and while discussing delays to phase II of the project (PR-123 to PR-132), the regional director of the Autoridad de Carreteras y Transportación stated that the PR-132-to-PR-500 segment under construction (Phase III) had sustained damages from the quakes. The segment connecting, which was already running two years behind schedule prior to the earthquakes and which was due for completion by September 2020, would now have a completion date based on the results of an evaluation "at greater depth" of the damages caused by the earthquake.

== Major intersections ==
The five exits existing so far are PR-52, PR-2, PR-163 in the southwestern segment, and PR-123 and PR-10 in the northwestern segment. When completed, the road will have six exits in this sequence from north to south: PR-10, PR-123, PR-132, PR-163, PR-2, and PR-52. The entire route is located in Ponce. All exits are unnumbered.

Location	km	mi	Destinations	Notes
Canas	7.27	4.52	PR-52 north (Autopista Luis A. Ferré) – San Juan	Southern terminus of PR-9; trumpet interchange
Canas	7.0	4.3	PR-2 – Ponce, Mayagüez	El Tuque sector; partial cloverleaf interchange
Canas	6.4	4.0	PR-Avenida Maruca – Ponce	Ponce Towne Center; at-grade intersection
Canas	5.4	3.4	PR-500 – Ponce	Temporary northern terminus of southern segment; incomplete diamond interchange. Mainline stub exist for a future extension. Avenida Las Américas vicinity.
Temporary gap in PR-9
Canas Urbano–Canas line	5.0– 3.8	3.1– 2.4	PR-132 – Ponce, Peñuelas	Jardines del Caribe vicinity; diamond interchange
Temporary gap in PR-9
Magueyes Urbano	2.1– 2.0	1.3– 1.2	PR-123 – Ponce, Adjuntas	Temporary southern terminus of northern segment; at-grade intersection
Magueyes Urbano–Magueyes line	0.4	0.25	PR-Calle 7 – Ponce	El Madrigal vicinity; diamond interchange
Portugués	0.0	0.0	PR-10 (Carretera Salvador "Chiry" Vassallo Ruiz) – Ponce, Adjuntas	Northern terminus of PR-9; trumpet interchange
1.000 mi = 1.609 km; 1.000 km = 0.621 mi: Unopened

== See also ==
- List of highways in Ponce, Puerto Rico
- Román Baldorioty de Castro
