= Puerto Rico Highway 163 =

Highway in Puerto Rico

Highway 163
- Ruta 163

Route information
- Maintained by Puerto Rico DTPW
- Length: 4.5 km (2.8 mi)
- Existed: 1960–present

Major junctions
- West end: PR-500 in Canas Urbano
- PR-2R in Canas Urbano; PR-123 in Canas Urbano; PR-12 in San Antón
- East end: PR-2 in San Antón

Location
- Country: United States
- Territory: Puerto Rico
- Municipalities: Ponce

Highway system
- Roads in Puerto Rico; List
| ← PR-162 | → PR-164 |

Puerto Rico Highway 163 (PR-163) is a major two-way thoroughfare in Ponce, Puerto Rico. The road has both of its termini as well as all of its length entirely within the Ponce city limits. The road runs east to west from its eastern terminus at PR-2 in Barrio San Antón to its western terminus at PR-500 in Barrio Canas. The road has a length of 4.8 kilometers. Most of the road runs as part of Avenida Las Américas.

== Route description ==
The two-way roadway is 4.8 kilometers long, starts at PR-2 in Barrio San Antón and runs westward. The road is named "Avenida Julio Enrique Monagas" from kilometer 0.0 at PR-2, in the western end of Barrio San Antón, to kilometer 0.7 in central Barrio San Antón, where it then starts to run over Avenida Las Américas. It then runs its next 4.1 kilometers over Avenida Las Américas until its western terminus at its junction with PR-500 in Barrio Canas. The road's run on Avenida Julio Enrique Monagas is a divided 4-lane roadway; its run over Avenida Las Américas is as a divided 6-lane roadway. Its western terminus with PR-500 is near Puente San Antonio.

Starting at PR-2 in Barrio San Antón, PR-163 runs westerly. From there, the road's first major intersection is at kilometer 0.7 with Avenida Las Américas. Heading west, PR-163's next major intersection is with Avenida Santiago de los Caballeros, also known as "Avenida Malecón" (PR-12). Continuing west from PR-12, the road crosses over Río Portugués before passing by Hospital Metropolitano Dr. Pila. It then intersects with Avenida Hostos (PR-123) in Barrio Canas, after which it passes by Museo de Arte de Ponce on the right and Pontifical Catholic University of Puerto Rico, on the left. Its next major intersection is with PR-2R (Ramal PR-2) at Secretaría de Recreación y Deportes Francisco "Pancho" Coimbre, near Francisco Montaner Stadium and Juan Pachín Vicéns Auditorium. About 1 kilometer after this, the road comes to its end at its junction with PR-500 in Barrio Canas.

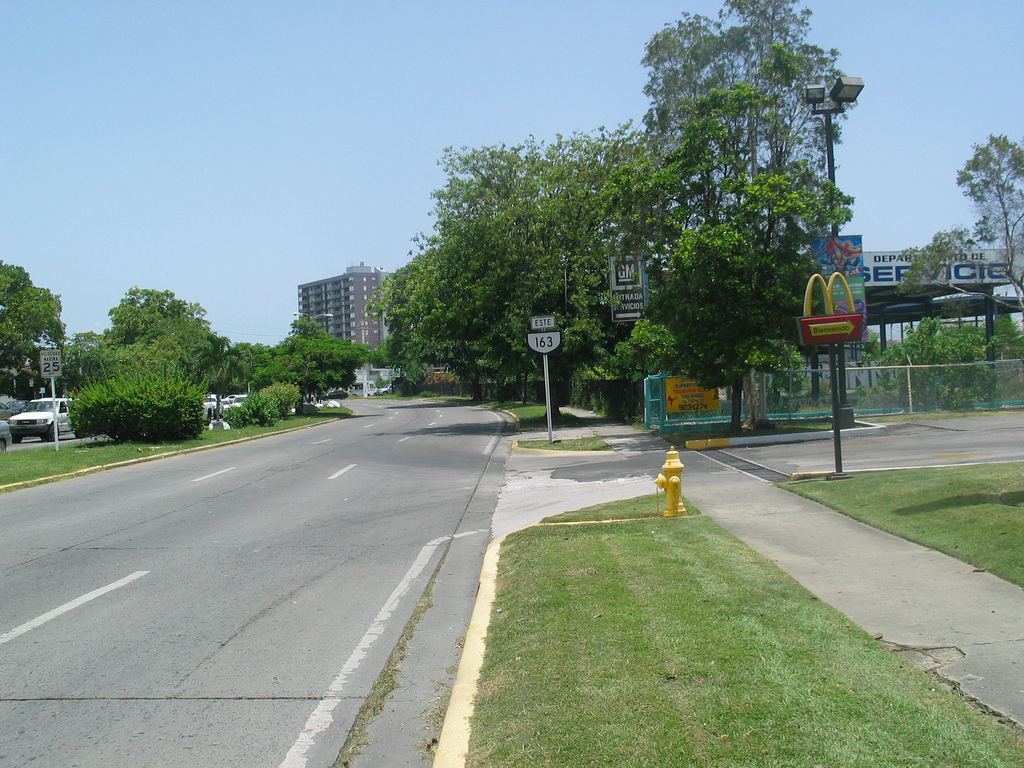
PR-163 looking east near PR-2R in Barrio Canas Urbano, Ponce, Puerto Rico

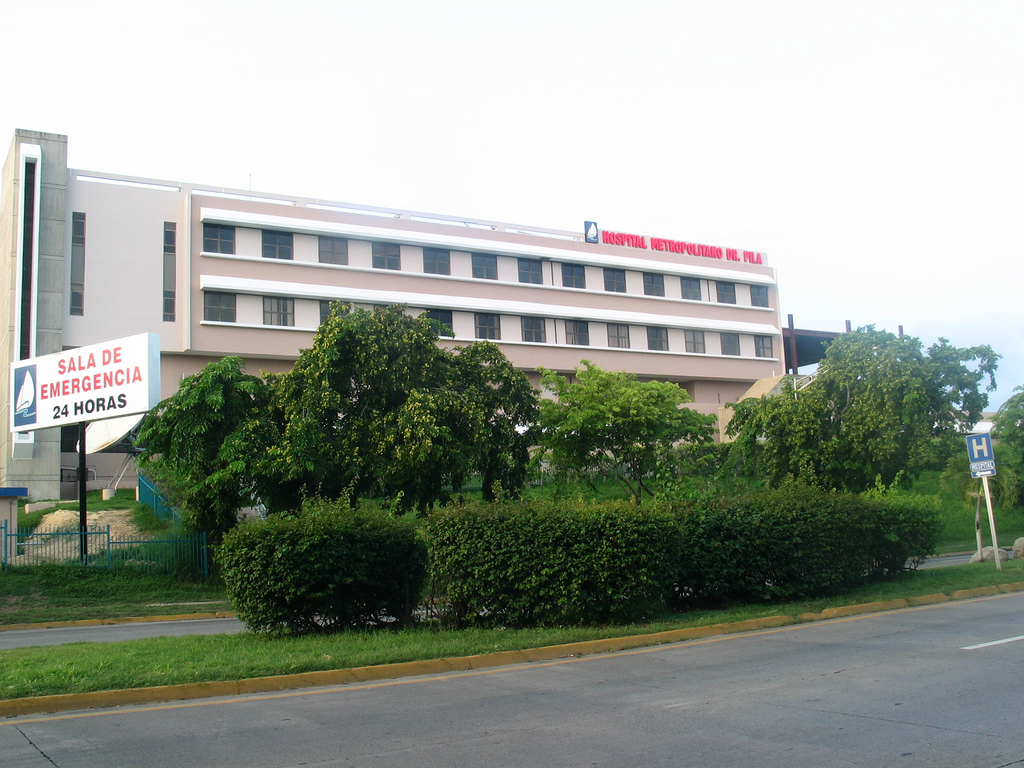
Hospital Dr. Pila (now, Hospital Metropolitano Dr. Pila) on the north side of Avenida Las Américas (PR-163) looking northeast, in Barrio Canas Urbano

=== Characteristics ===
The less transited western section of this road experiences an hourly traffic flow upwards of 2400 vehicles. On the westernmost end of the road, Puente San Antonio connects the road with PR-9, also called Avenida Baramaya.

== Major intersections ==
The entire route is located in Ponce.

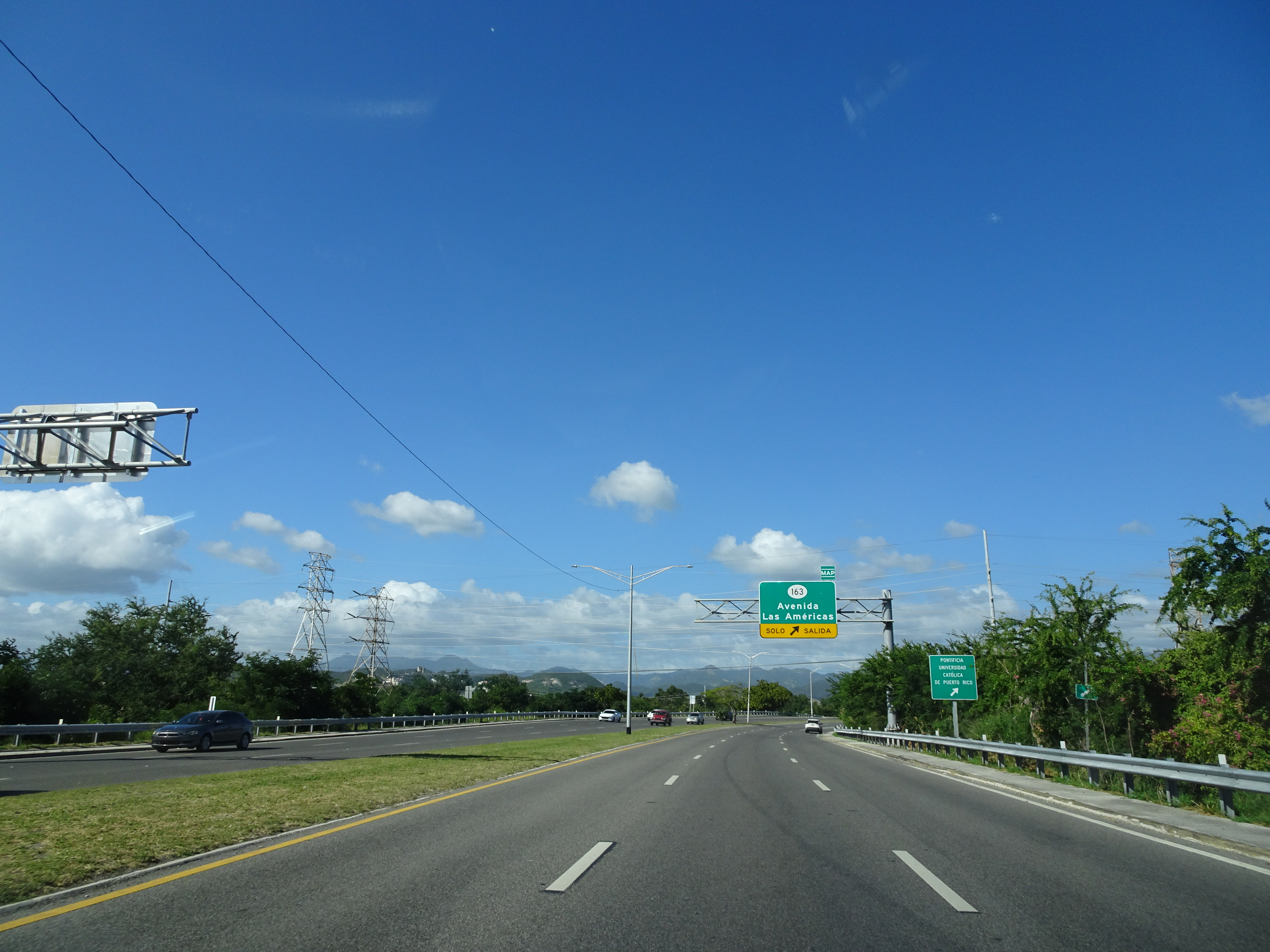
PR-12 north near its exit to PR-163 (Avenida Las Américas)

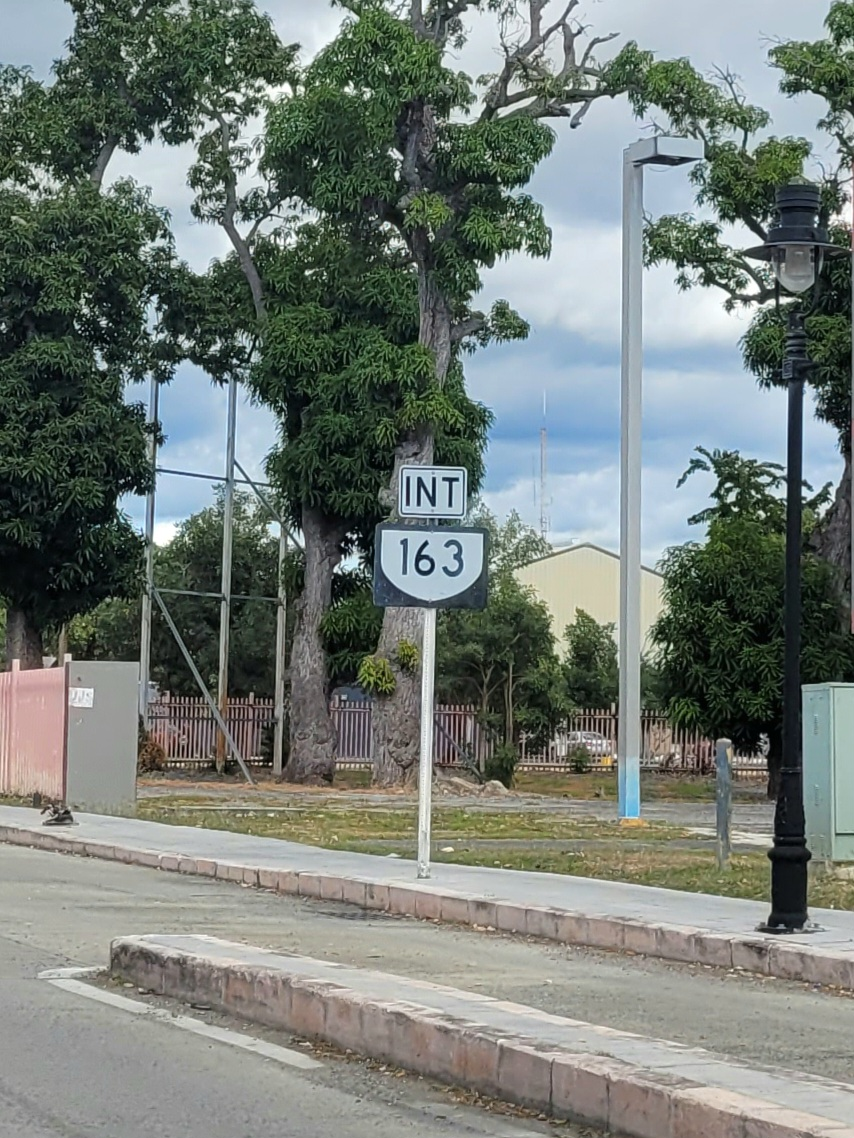
PR-123 north approaching PR-163 (Avenida Las Américas) junction

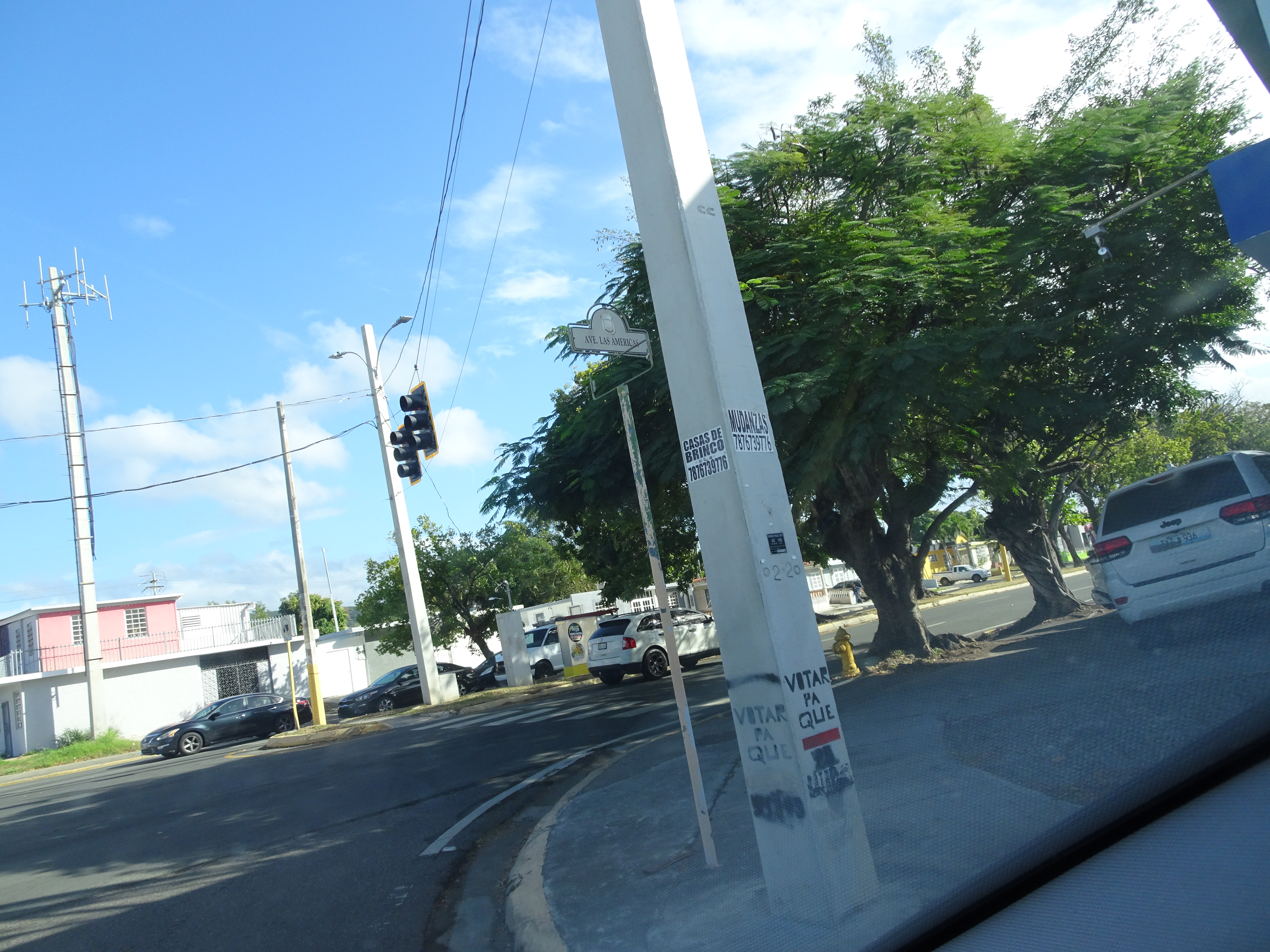
Avenida Eduardo Ruberté Bisó at PR-163 (Avenida Las Américas) junction

| Location | km | mi | Destinations | Notes |
|---|---|---|---|---|
| Canas Urbano | 4.5 | 2.8 | PR-500 | Western terminus of PR-163 |
| Canas Urbano | 3.8 | 2.4 | Avenida Eduardo Ruberté Bisó | |
| Canas Urbano | 3.3 | 2.1 | PR-2R | |
| Canas Urbano | 2.5 | 1.6 | Avenida Luis Muñoz Rivera / Calle Capitán Correa | |
| Canas Urbano | 1.6 | 0.99 | PR-123 – Ponce Centro, Ponce Playa | |
| San Antón | 0.85– 0.75 | 0.53– 0.47 | PR-12 – Ponce Playa, Mayagüez, Juana Díaz | Diamond interchange |
| San Antón | 0.65 | 0.40 | Avenida Las Américas / Avenida Julio Enrique Monagas / Calle Marzo Cabrera | Eastern terminus of PR-163 through Bulevar Luis A. Ferré (Avenida Las Américas) and western terminus of PR-163 through Avenida Julio Enrique Monagas |
| San Antón | 0.0 | 0.0 | PR-2 | Eastern terminus of PR-163 |
1.000 mi = 1.609 km; 1.000 km = 0.621 mi: Route transition

== See also ==
- List of highways in Ponce, Puerto Rico
- List of streets in Ponce, Puerto Rico
