= Avenida Las Américas =

Highway in Ponce, Puerto Rico

- Bulevar Luis A. Ferré
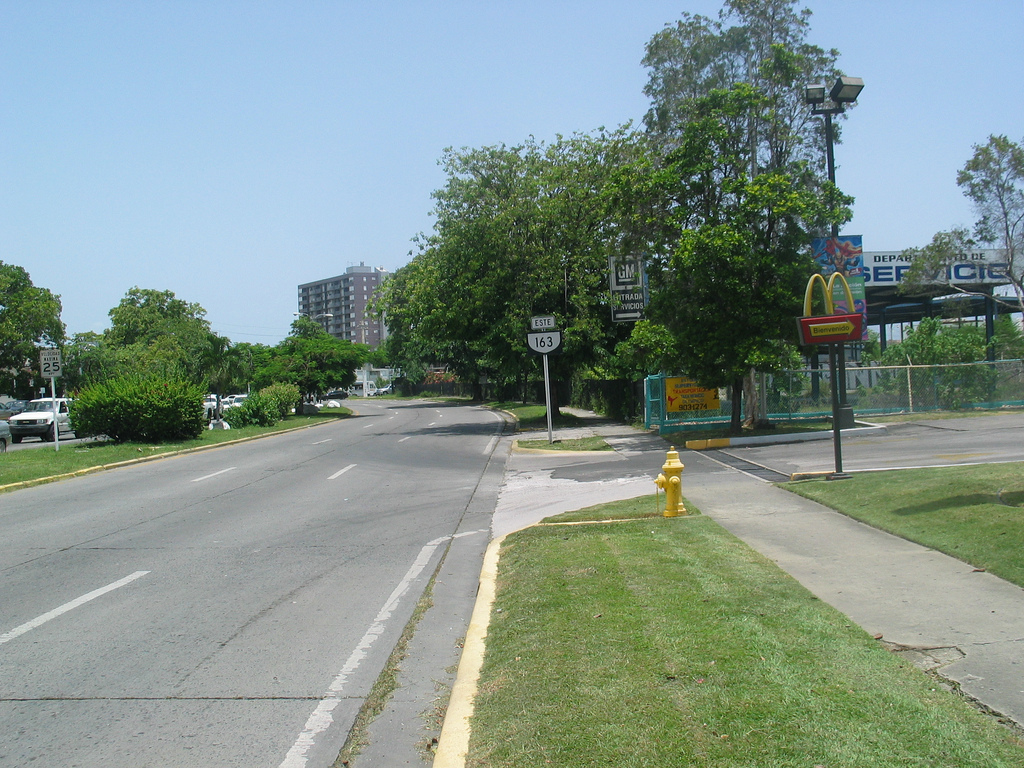
- Avenida Las Américas eastbound lanes, looking east near PR-2R in Canas Urbano, Ponce, Puerto Rico
- Native name: Avenida Las Américas (Spanish)
- Former name: Avenida Interior
- Part of: PR-163
- Namesake: Luis A. Ferré
- Owner: Ponce Municipal Government
- Maintained by: DTOP and Ponce Municipal Government
- Length: 7.0 km
- Width: 6 lanes
- Location: From Canas to Canas Urbano to San Antón
- East end: Barrio Canas at PR-500
- Major junctions: PR-500 in Canas; PR-2R in Canas Urbano; PR-123 in Canas Urbano; PR-12 in San Antón; PR-1 in San Antón
- West end: Barrio San Antón at PR-1 and Avenida Emilio Fagot

Construction
- Commissioned: 1960
- Construction start: 1955
- Completion: 1960
- Inauguration: 1 January 1960

Other
- Known for: Major West–East artery
- Status: In use

Avenida Las Américas, is a major thoroughfare in Ponce, Puerto Rico. Most of its length is signed as Puerto Rico Highway 163 (PR-163). The highway has both of its termini as well as all of its length entirely within the Ponce city limits. It runs west to east. As of 12 November 2010, the segment of this road from its intersection in the west with PR-2R (a.k.a., Carretera Pámpanos) to its intersection in the east with PR-12, officially became the Bulevar Luis A. Ferré. The segment from Avenida Hostos in the east to Carretera Pámpanos (PR-2R) in the west, the first segment built, was built in 1960.

== Route description ==
The highway is a two-way divided six-lane road that starts at its junction in Barrio Canas with PR-500, near Avenida Baramaya (PR-9), next to Puente San Antonio, and runs east until it meets PR-1 at Bulevar Miguel Pou.

Avenida Las Américas runs easterly from PR-500, intersecting with Ramal PR-2 (PR-2R) near Francisco Montaner Stadium and Juan Pachín Vicéns Auditorium, and passing Secretaría de Recreación y Deportes. Continuing east it passes Pontifical Catholic University of Puerto Rico, and Museo de Arte de Ponce, before intersecting with Avenida Hostos (PR-123). Other points of interest on Avenida Las Américas are the former Puerto Rico Police headquarters for the Ponce Region, the Ponce Governmental Center, and Hospital Metropolitano Dr. Pila. Continuing east, the road crosses Rio Portugués and immediately afterwards the road intersects Avenida Santiago de los Caballeros (PR 12), and takes a northerly turn to intersect with PR-1 at Bulevar Miguel Pou, about one mile further. Additional businesses along its way are Café Rico and Centro del Sur Mall, both at Avenida Las Américas's intersection with PR-133, also known as Calle Comercio.

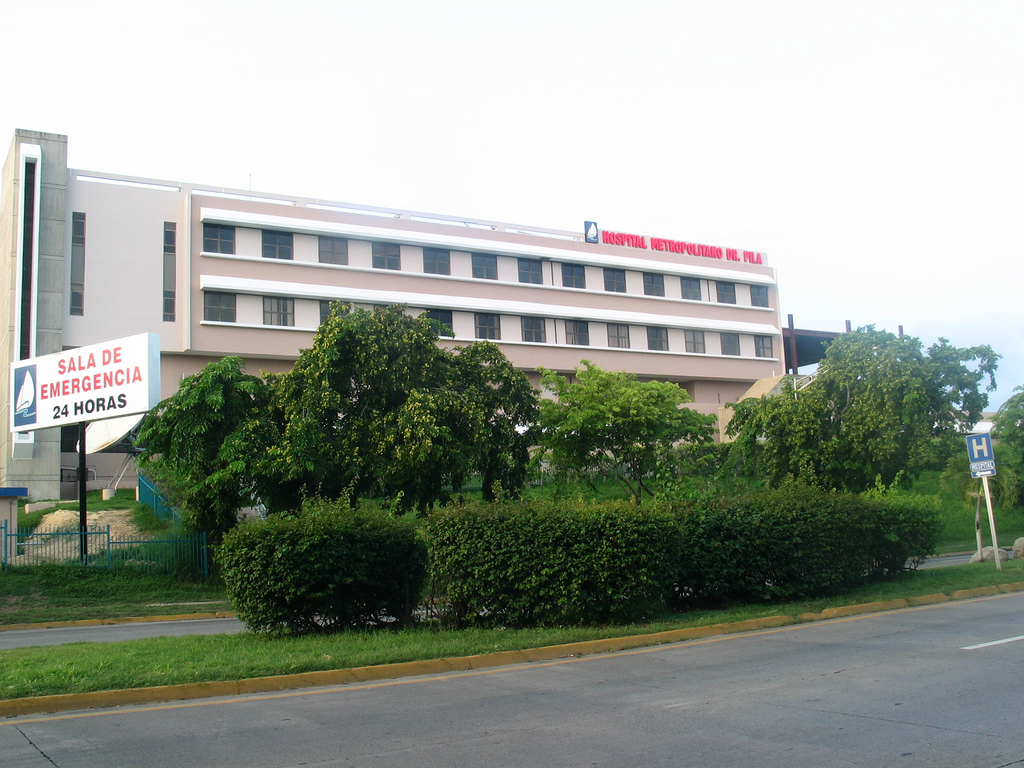
Hospital Metropolitano Dr. Pila on the north side of Avenida Las Américas looking northeast, in Barrio Canas Urbano

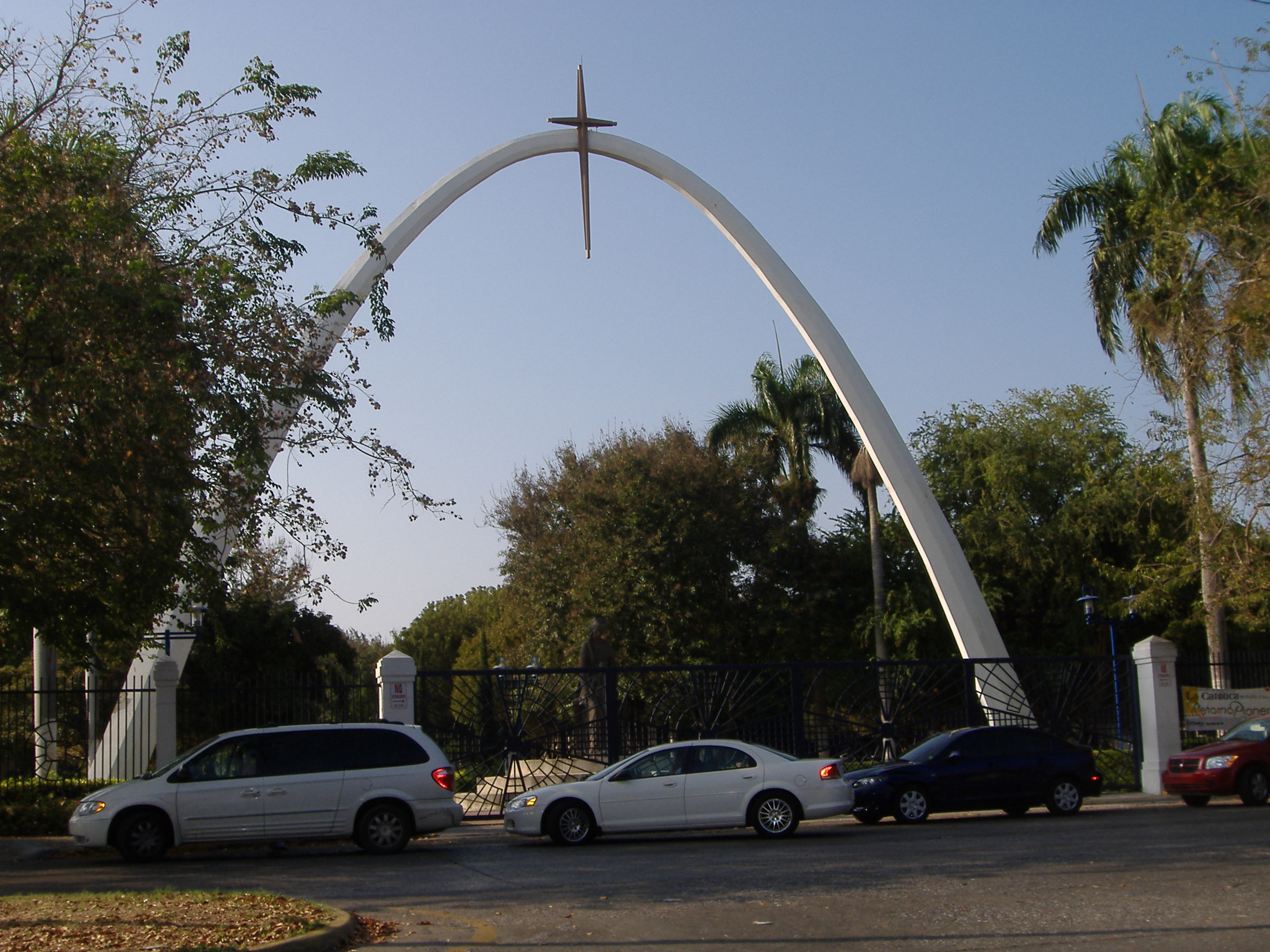
Main entrance to the Pontifical Catholic University of Puerto Rico at Avenida Las Américas

=== Characteristics ===
Avenida Las Américas is 7.0 kilometers long and ends at the intersection of Boulevard Miguel Pou (PR-1). Although Avenida Las Américas ends at its intersection with PR-1, physically the roadway continues as a non-divided four-lane road called Avenida Emilio Fagot to intersect with PR-14 and, further north, to come to an end at a junction with PR-10 for access to points in northeast and north Puerto Rico, respectively. The less transited western section of Avenida Las Américas experiences an hourly traffic flow upwards of 2400 vehicles. On the westernmost end of the road, Puente San Antonio connects Avenida Las Américas with PR-9, also called Avenida Baramaya.

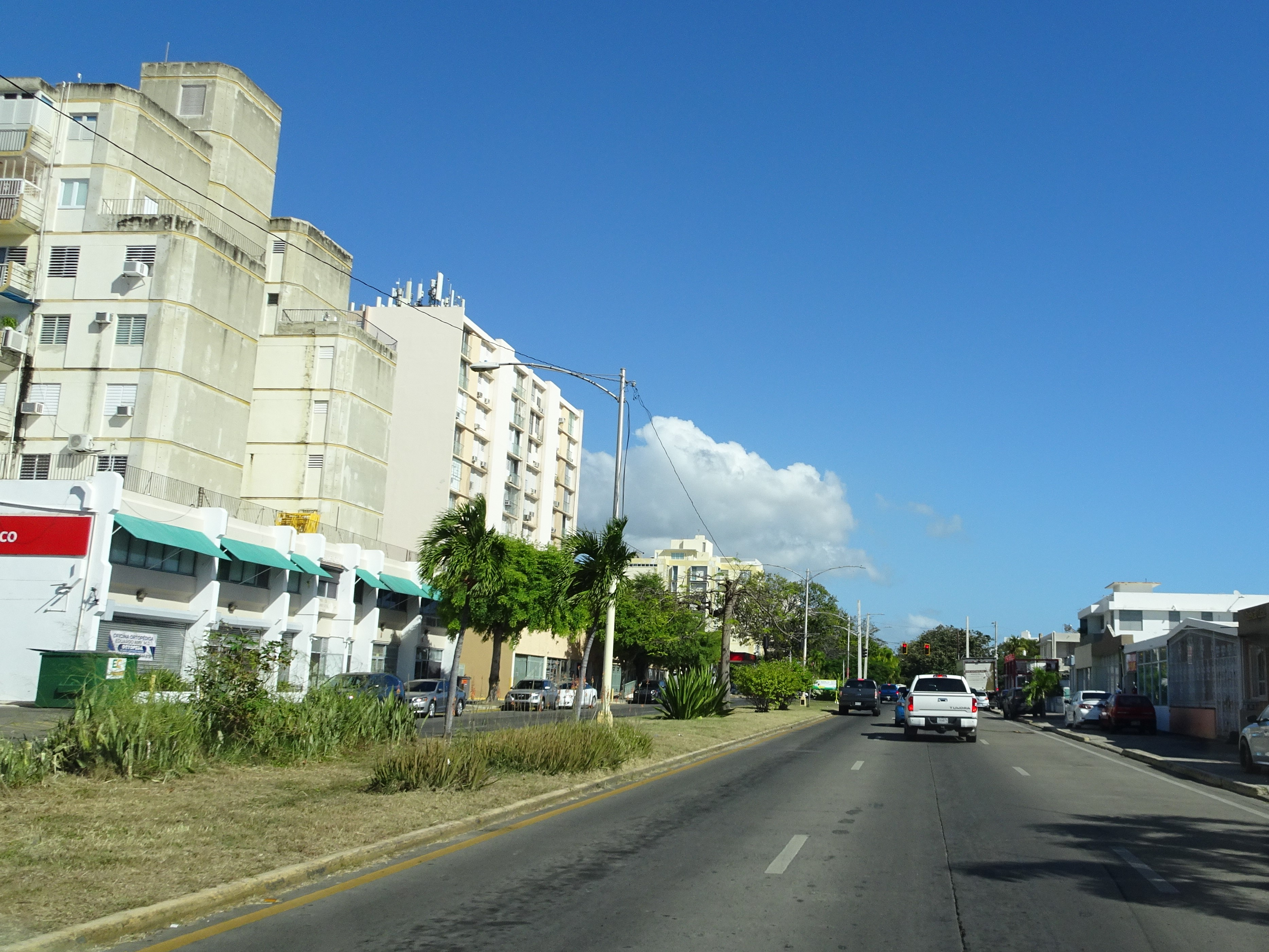
Avenida Las Américas eastbound

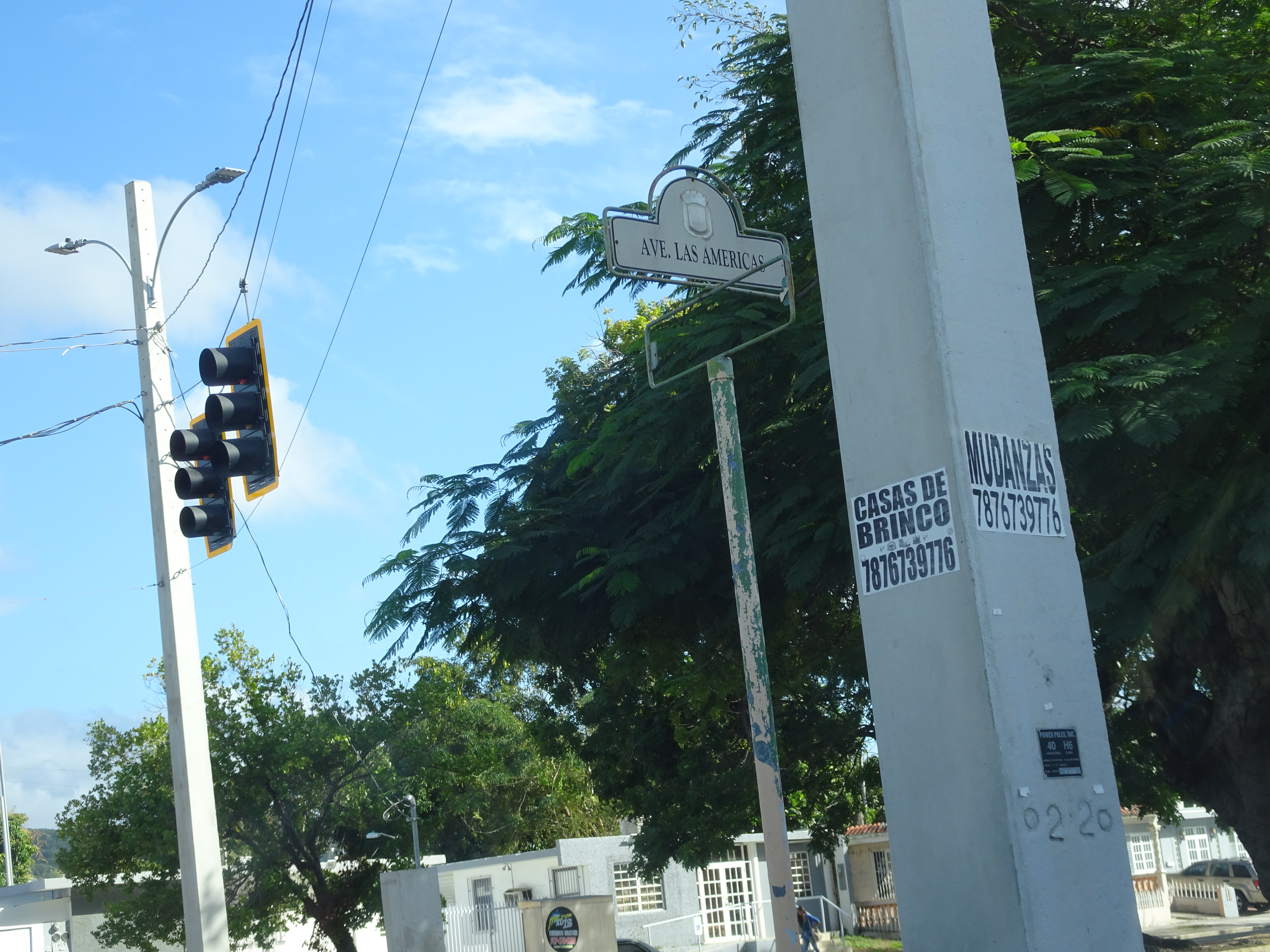
Avenida Las Américas sign

== History ==
The segment of Avenida Las Américas from Avenida Hostos in the east to Carretera Pámpanos (PR-2R) in the west, was the first segment built; it was built in 1960. In the 1960s, the segment from Carretera Pámpanos in the east to just before PR-500 in the west was built as part of the urban development of that area in the 1960s. However, Avenida Las Américas came to an abrupt dead end before reaching PR-500. The third segment built was built to connect Avenida Las Américas from Avenida Hostos (PR-123) in the west to Avenida Julio E. Monagas in the east. This last segment was built in the 1980s. During the same period the road was expanded to the west to connect Avenida Las Américas with PR-500.

== See also ==
- List of streets in Ponce, Puerto Rico
- List of highways in Ponce, Puerto Rico
