= Coto, Peñuelas, Puerto Rico =

Barrio of Puerto Rico

Coto
- Barrio
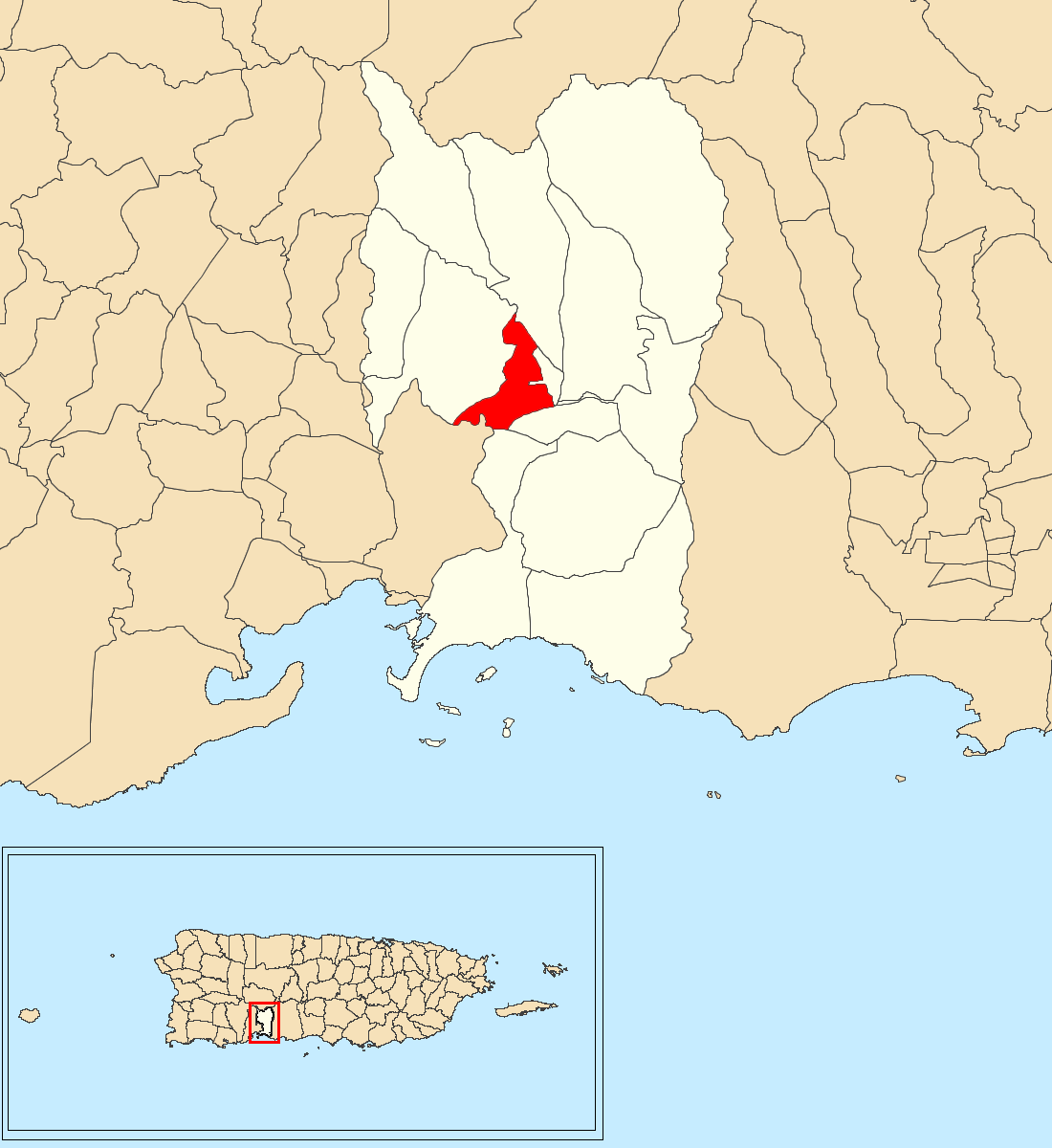
- Location of Coto within the municipality of Peñuelas shown in red

- Location of Puerto Rico
- Coordinates: 18°03′18″N 66°43′50″W
- Commonwealth: Puerto Rico
- Municipality: Peñuelas

Area
  - Total: 1.15 sq mi (3.0 km^{2})
  - Land: 1.15 sq mi (3.0 km^{2})
  - Water: 0 sq mi (0 km^{2})
- Elevation: 256 ft (78 m)

Population (2010)
  - Total: 1,467
  - Density: 1,275.7/sq mi (492.6/km^{2})
- Source: 2010 Census
- Time zone: UTC−4 (AST)

Coto is a barrio in the municipality of Peñuelas, Puerto Rico. Its population in 2010 was 1,467.

== History ==
Coto was in Spain's gazetteers until Puerto Rico was ceded by Spain in the aftermath of the Spanish–American War under the terms of the Treaty of Paris of 1898 and became an unincorporated territory of the United States. In 1899, the United States Department of War conducted a census of Puerto Rico finding that the combined population of Coto and Encarnación barrios was 1,271.

Historical population
Census	Pop.	Note	%±
1910	731		—
1920	989		35.3%
1930	956		−3.3%
1940	1,389		45.3%
1950	367		−73.6%
1960	1,147		212.5%
1970	0		−100.0%
1980	1,031		—
1990	871		−15.5%
2000	1,244		42.8%
2010	1,467		17.9%
U.S. Decennial Census; 1900 (N/A) 1910-1930; 1930-1950 1980-2000 2010

== See also ==
- List of communities in Puerto Rico
