= Tallaboa Alta =

Barrio of Peñuelas, Puerto Rico

- Barrio
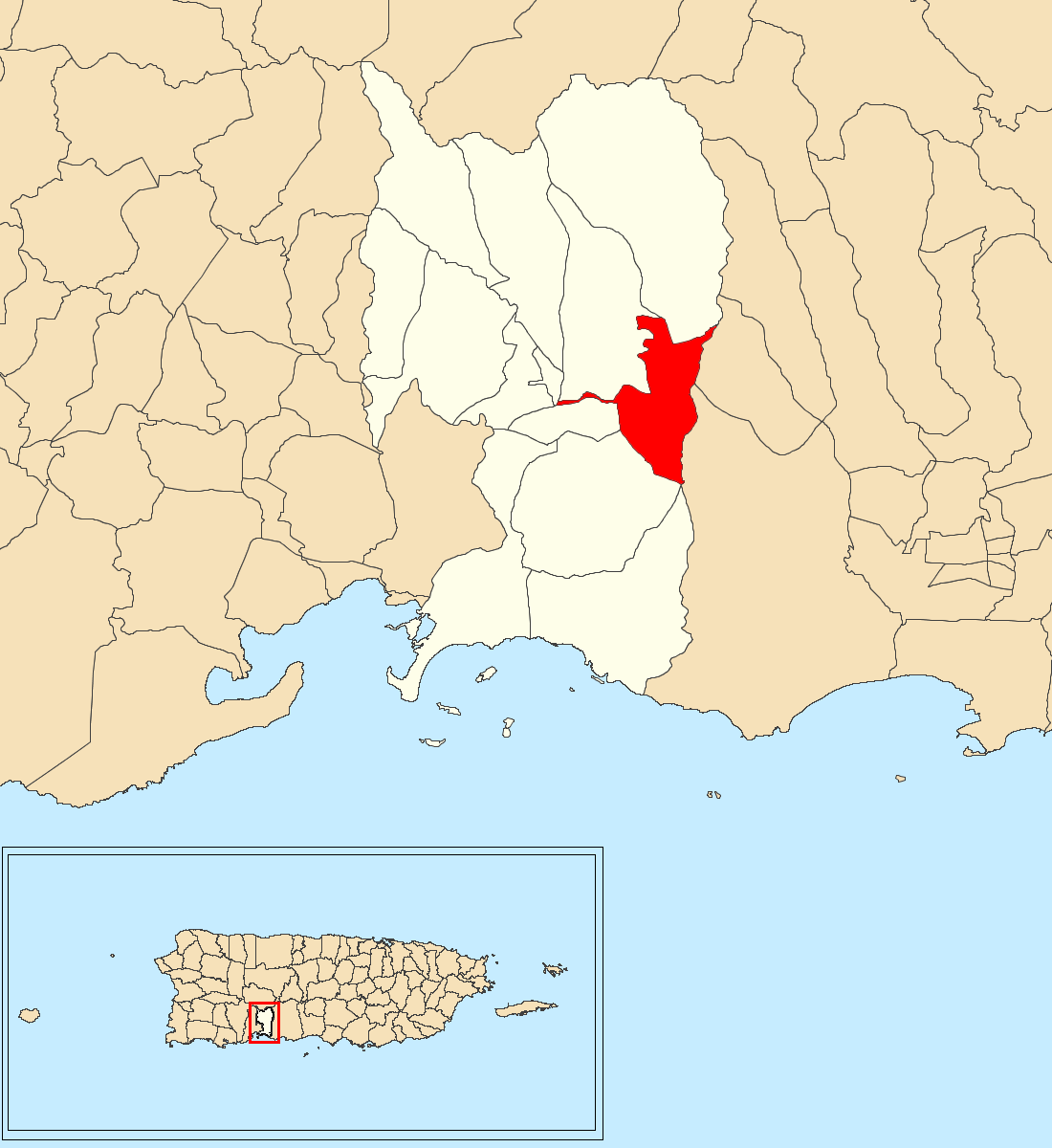
- Location of Tallaboa Alta within the municipality of Peñuelas shown in red

- Location of Puerto Rico
- Coordinates: 18°03′13″N 66°41′40″W
- Commonwealth: Puerto Rico
- Municipality: Peñuelas

Area
  - Total: 2.4 sq mi (6.2 km^{2})
  - Land: 2.4 sq mi (6.2 km^{2})
  - Water: 0 sq mi (0 km^{2})
- Elevation: 446 ft (136 m)

Population (2010)
  - Total: 3,784
  - Density: 1,576.7/sq mi (608.8/km^{2})
- Source: 2010 Census
- Time zone: UTC−4 (AST)

Tallaboa Alta Barrio is a barrio in the municipality of Peñuelas, Puerto Rico. Its population in 2010 was 3,784.

== History ==
Tallaboa was an important village, led by "beloved caciques", before the Spanish and European colonization of Puerto Rico in the late 15th century.

Tallaboa Alta was in Spain's gazetteers until Puerto Rico was ceded by Spain in the aftermath of the Spanish–American War under the terms of the Treaty of Paris of 1898 and became an unincorporated territory of the United States. In 1899, the United States Department of War conducted a census of Puerto Rico finding that the population of Tallaboa Alta barrio was 946.

Historical population
Census	Pop.	Note	%±
1900	946		—
1910	974		3.0%
1920	1,110		14.0%
1930	1,230		10.8%
1940	984		−20.0%
1950	740		−24.8%
1960	1,457		96.9%
1970	1,721		18.1%
1980	1,625		−5.6%
1990	2,567		58.0%
2000	4,037		57.3%
2010	3,784		−6.3%
U.S. Decennial Census; 1899 (shown as 1900) 1910-1930; 1930-1950 1980-2000 2010

== See also ==
- List of communities in Puerto Rico
