= Cuebas =

Barrio of Peñuelas, Puerto Rico

- Barrio
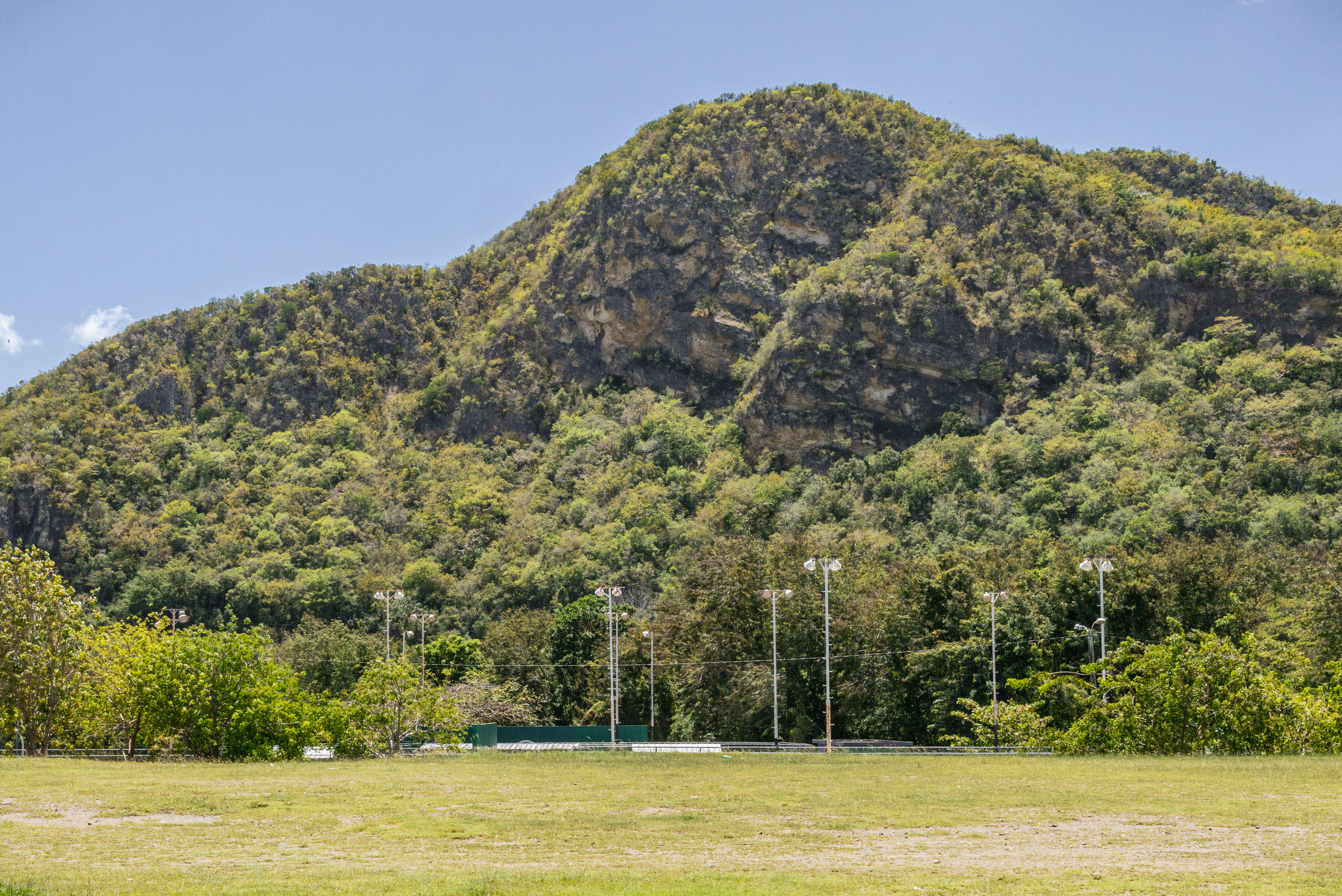
- Limestone hills of Peñuelas

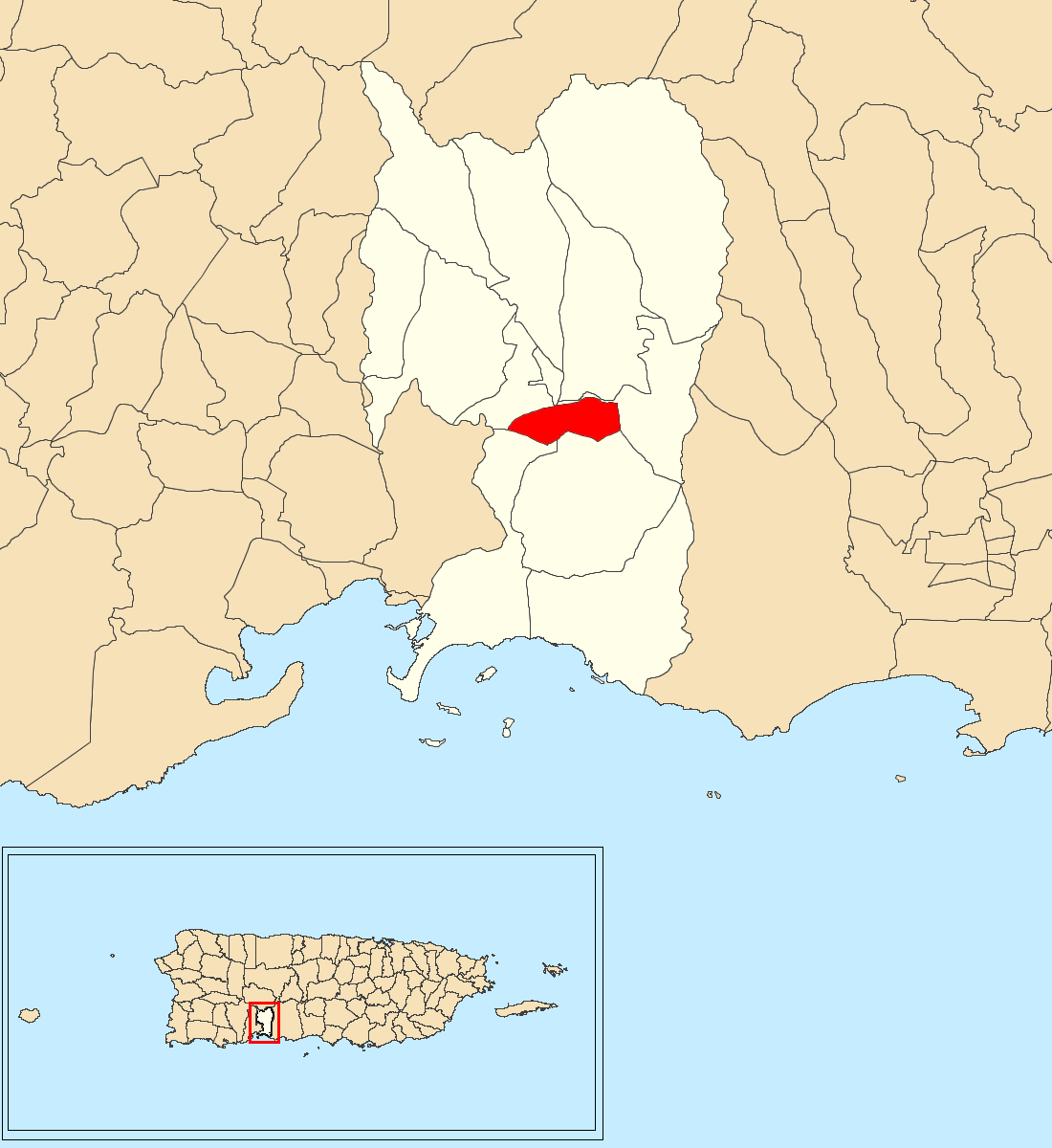
- Location of Cuebas within the municipality of Peñuelas shown in red

- Location of Puerto Rico
- Coordinates: 18°02′51″N 66°43′02″W
- Commonwealth: Puerto Rico
- Municipality: Peñuelas

Area
  - Total: 0.95 sq mi (2.5 km^{2})
  - Land: 0.95 sq mi (2.5 km^{2})
  - Water: 0 sq mi (0 km^{2})
- Elevation: 128 ft (39 m)

Population (2010)
  - Total: 449
  - Density: 477.7/sq mi (184.4/km^{2})
- Source: 2010 Census
- Time zone: UTC−4 (AST)

Cuebas is a barrio in the municipality of Peñuelas, Puerto Rico. Its population in 2010 was 449.

== History ==
Cuebas was in Spain's gazetteers until Puerto Rico was ceded by Spain in the aftermath of the Spanish–American War under the terms of the Treaty of Paris of 1898 and became an unincorporated territory of the United States. In 1899, the United States Department of War conducted a census of Puerto Rico finding that the combined population of Cuebas and Tallaboa Saliente barrios was 940.

Historical population
Census	Pop.	Note	%±
1910	400		—
1920	468		17.0%
1930	449		−4.1%
1940	491		9.4%
1950	407		−17.1%
1960	324		−20.4%
1970	340		4.9%
1980	389		14.4%
1990	427		9.8%
2000	430		0.7%
2010	449		4.4%
U.S. Decennial Census; 1900 (N/A) 1910-1930; 1930-1950 1980-2000 2010

== See also ==
- List of communities in Puerto Rico
