= Macaná, Guayanilla, Puerto Rico =

Barrio of Puerto Rico

Macaná
- Barrio
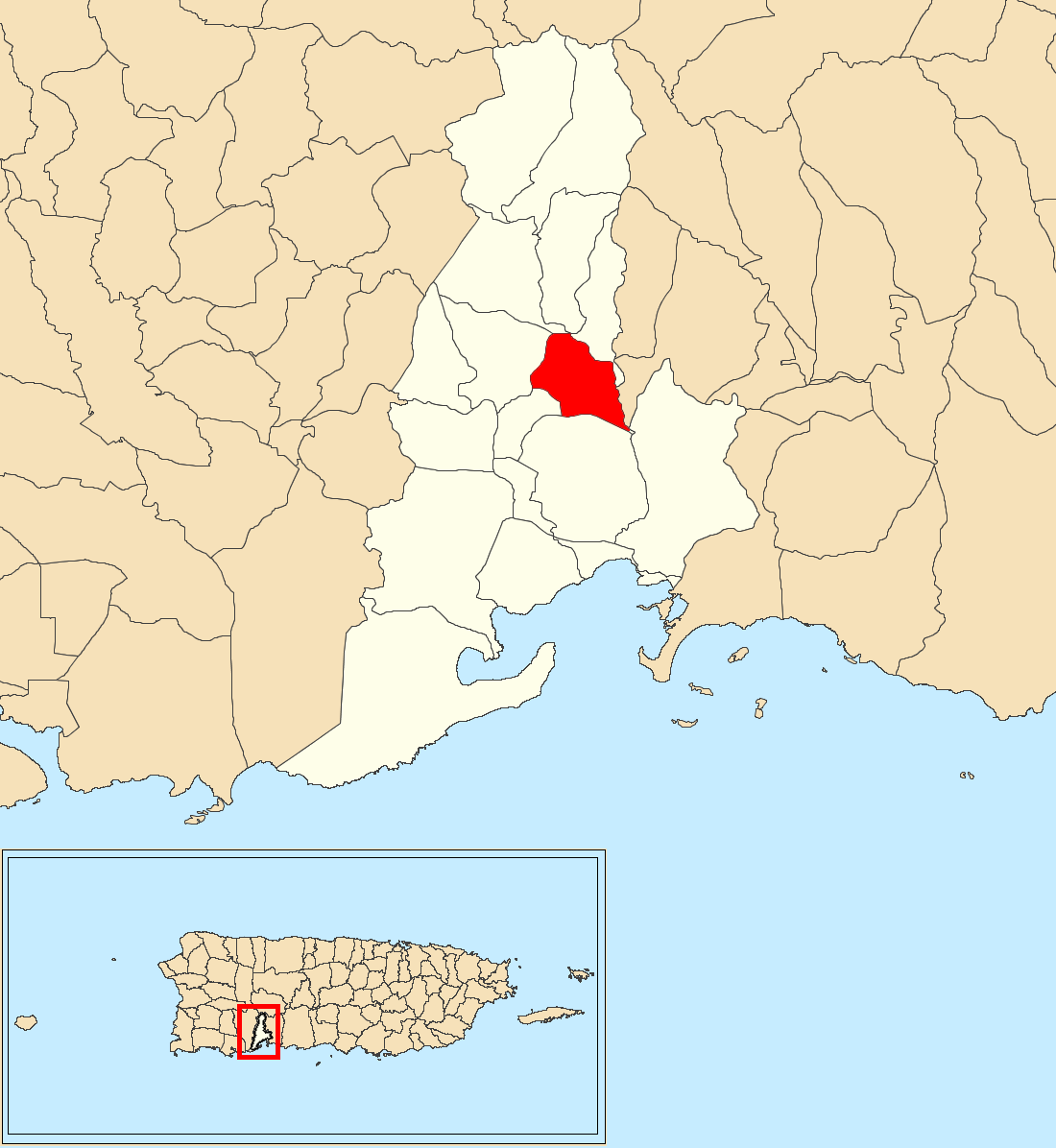
- Location of Macaná within the municipality of Guayanilla shown in red

- Location of Puerto Rico
- Coordinates: 18°03′02″N 66°46′41″W
- Commonwealth: Puerto Rico
- Municipality: Guayanilla

Area
  - Total: 1.43 sq mi (3.7 km^{2})
  - Land: 1.43 sq mi (3.7 km^{2})
  - Water: 0 sq mi (0 km^{2})
- Elevation: 427 ft (130 m)

Population (2010)
  - Total: 1,483
  - Density: 1,037.1/sq mi (400.4/km^{2})
- Source: 2010 Census
- Time zone: UTC−4 (AST)

Macaná is a rural barrio in the municipality of Guayanilla, Puerto Rico. Its population in 2010 was 1,483.

== Features and demographics ==
Macaná has 1.43 square miles (3.7 km^{2}) of land area and no water area. In 2010, its population was 1,483 with a population density of 1,037.1 inhabitants per square mile (400.4/km^{2}).

Historical population
Census	Pop.	Note	%±
1910	664		—
1920	750		13.0%
1930	849		13.2%
1940	954		12.4%
1950	752		−21.2%
1960	754		0.3%
1970	1,379		82.9%
1980	1,333		−3.3%
1990	1,195		−10.4%
2000	1,446		21.0%
2010	1,483		2.6%
U.S. Decennial Census; 1900 (N/A) 1910-1930; 1930-1950 1980-2000 2010

== History ==
Macaná was in Spain's gazetteers until Puerto Rico was ceded by Spain in the aftermath of the Spanish–American War under the terms of the Treaty of Paris of 1898 and became an unincorporated territory of the United States. In 1899, the United States Department of War conducted a census of Puerto Rico finding that the combined population of Macaná and Barrero barrios was 1,154.

== See also ==
- List of communities in Puerto Rico
