= Macaná, Peñuelas, Puerto Rico =

Barrio of Puerto Rico

Macaná
- Barrio
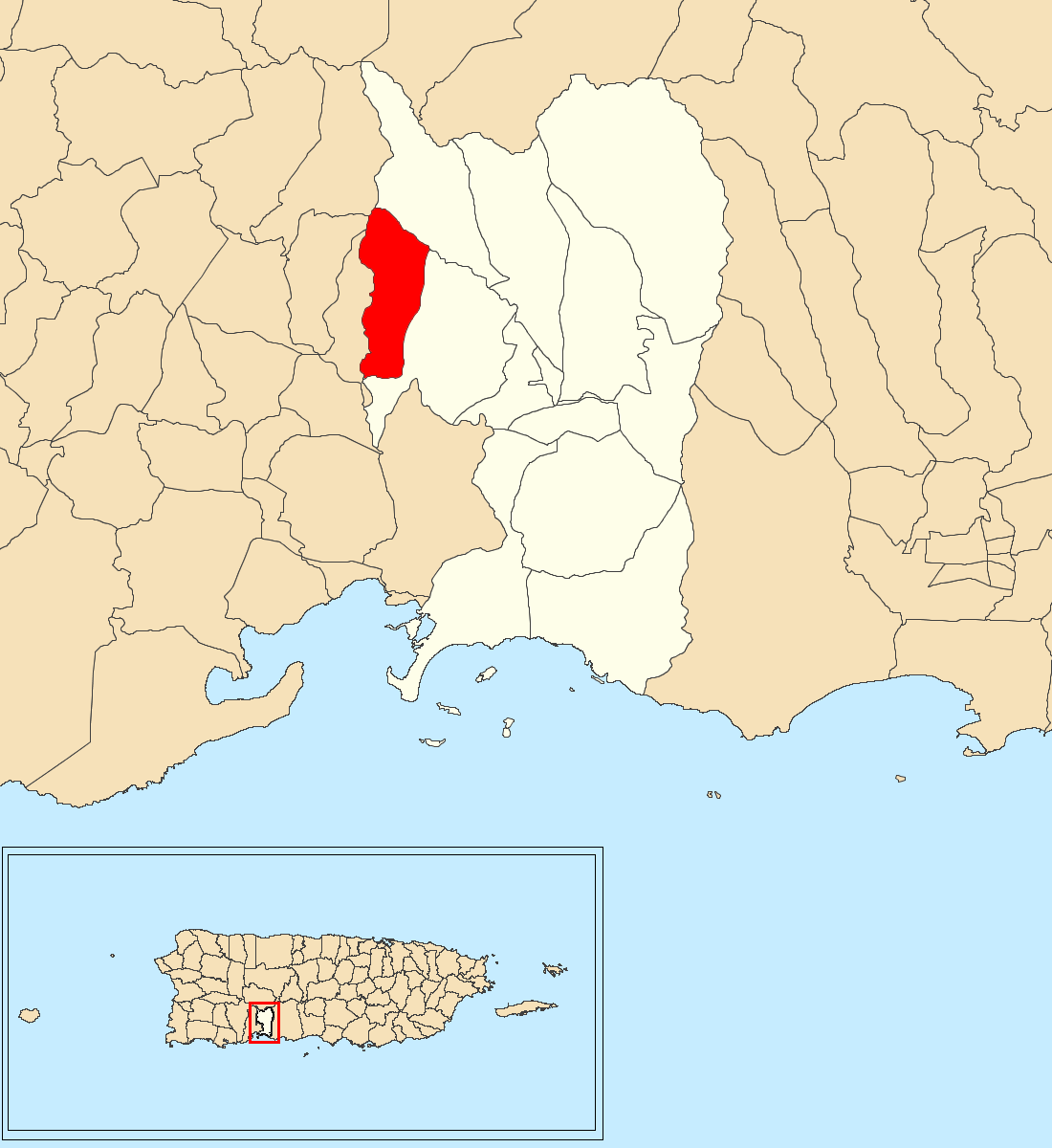
- Location of Macaná within the municipality of Peñuelas shown in red

- Location of Puerto Rico
- Coordinates: 18°04′40″N 66°45′42″W
- Commonwealth: Puerto Rico
- Municipality: Peñuelas

Area
  - Total: 2.17 sq mi (5.6 km^{2})
  - Land: 2.17 sq mi (5.6 km^{2})
  - Water: 0 sq mi (0 km^{2})
- Elevation: 1,161 ft (354 m)

Population (2010)
  - Total: 803
  - Density: 370/sq mi (140/km^{2})
- Source: 2010 Census
- Time zone: UTC−4 (AST)

Macaná is a barrio in the municipality of Peñuelas, Puerto Rico. Its population in 2010 was 803.

== History ==
Macaná was in Spain's gazetteers until Puerto Rico was ceded by Spain in the aftermath of the Spanish–American War under the terms of the Treaty of Paris of 1898 and became an unincorporated territory of the United States. In 1899, the United States Department of War conducted a census of Puerto Rico finding that the population of Macaná barrio was 1,025.

Historical population
Census	Pop.	Note	%±
1900	1,025		—
1910	897		−12.5%
1920	1,219		35.9%
1930	1,367		12.1%
1940	1,268		−7.2%
1950	1,584		24.9%
1960	1,107		−30.1%
1970	900		−18.7%
1980	828		−8.0%
1990	726		−12.3%
2000	826		13.8%
2010	803		−2.8%
U.S. Decennial Census; 1899 (shown as 1900) 1910-1930; 1930-1950 1980-2000 2010

== See also ==
- List of communities in Puerto Rico
