= Barrero, Guayanilla, Puerto Rico =

Barrio of Puerto Rico

Barrero
- Barrio
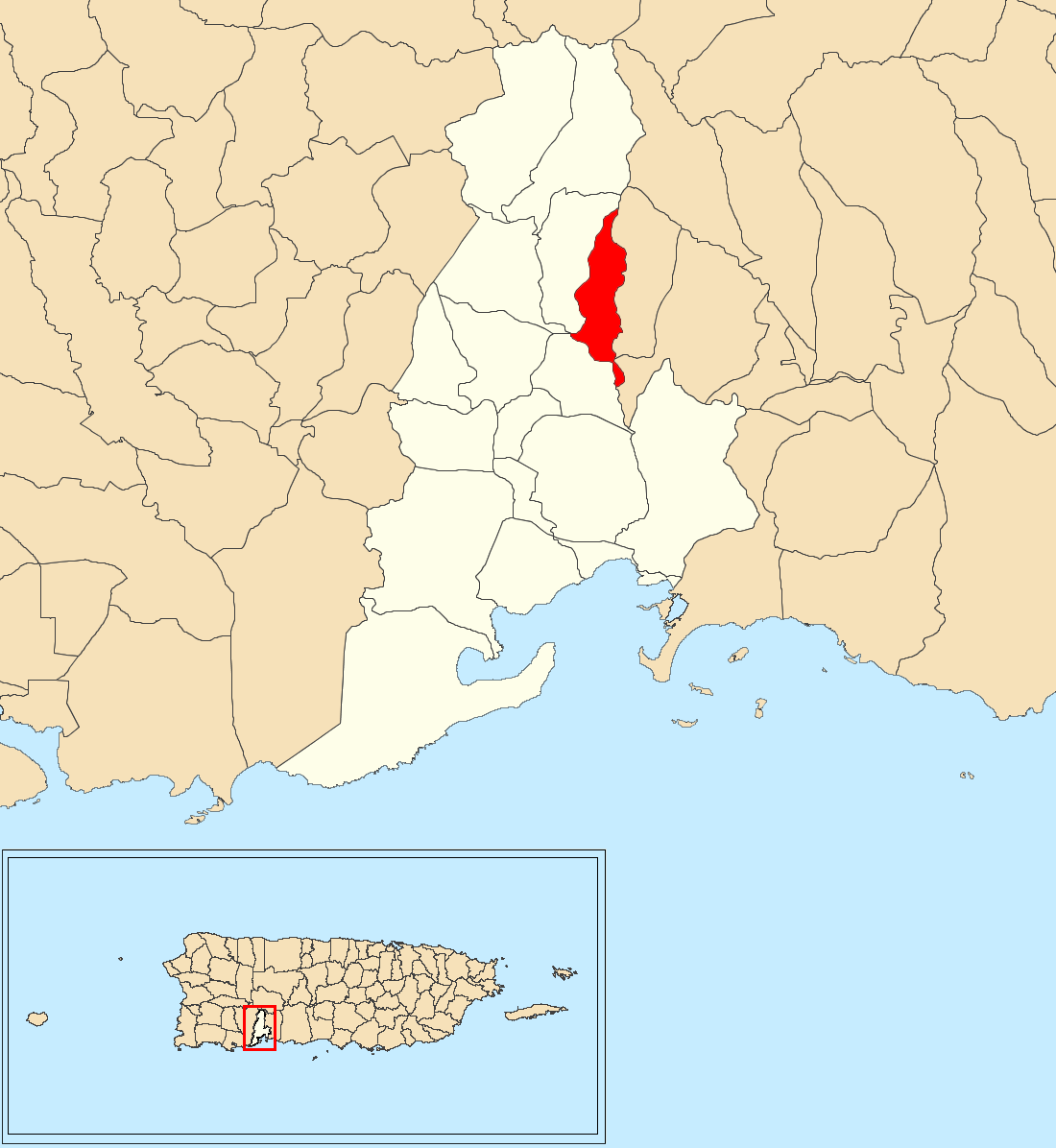
- Location of Barrero within the municipality of Guayanilla shown in red

- Location of Puerto Rico
- Coordinates: 18°04′08″N 66°46′17″W
- Commonwealth: Puerto Rico
- Municipality: Guayanilla

Area
  - Total: 1.28 sq mi (3.3 km^{2})
  - Land: 1.28 sq mi (3.3 km^{2})
  - Water: 0 sq mi (0 km^{2})
- Elevation: 656 ft (200 m)

Population (2010)
  - Total: 839
  - Density: 655.5/sq mi (253.1/km^{2})
- Source: 2010 Census
- Time zone: UTC−4 (AST)

Barrero is a rural barrio in the municipality of Guayanilla, Puerto Rico. Its population in 2010 was 839.

== Features and demographics ==
Barrero has 1.28 square miles (3.3 km^{2}) of land area and no water area. In 2010, its population was 839 with a population density of 655.5 inhabitants per square mile (253.1/km^{2}).

Historical population
Census	Pop.	Note	%±
1910	481		—
1920	646		34.3%
1930	599		−7.3%
1940	624		4.2%
1950	900		44.2%
1960	723		−19.7%
1970	477		−34.0%
1980	841		76.3%
1990	968		15.1%
2000	1,033		6.7%
2010	839		−18.8%
U.S. Decennial Census; 1900 (N/A) 1910-1930; 1930-1950 1980-2000 2010

== History ==
Barrero was in Spain's gazetteers until Puerto Rico was ceded by Spain in the aftermath of the Spanish–American War under the terms of the Treaty of Paris of 1898 and became an unincorporated territory of the United States. In 1899, the United States Department of War conducted a census of Puerto Rico finding that the combined population of Macaná barrio and Barrero barrio was 1,154.

== See also ==
- List of communities in Puerto Rico
