= Tallaboa =

Tallaboa may refer to:

- Tallaboa Alta, Peñuelas, Puerto Rico, a barrio
- Tallaboa Poniente, Peñuelas, Puerto Rico, a barrio
- Tallaboa Saliente, Peñuelas, Puerto Rico, a barrio
- Tallaboa River, a river in Peñuelas, Puerto Rico
