= Guayanés River (Peñuelas, Puerto Rico) =

River of Puerto Rico

Coordinates: 18.0505187°N 66.7207300°W

- Native name: Río Guayanes (Spanish)

Location
- Commonwealth: Puerto Rico
- Municipality: Peñuelas

Physical characteristics
- Source
  - elevation: 128 ft
- Mouth
  - location: Tallaboa River

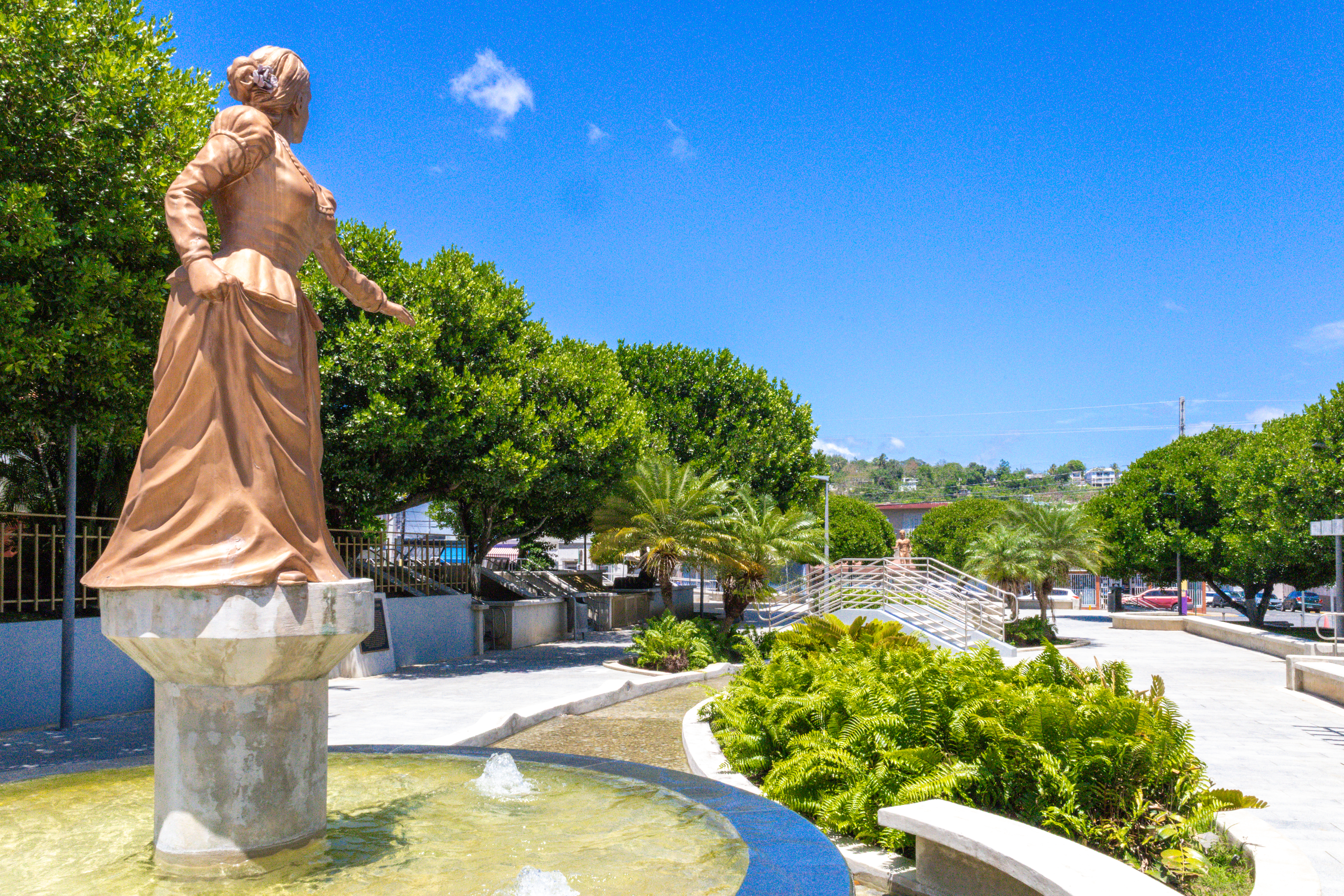
Monument to the river and its legend in the Peñuelas town square.

The Guayanés River (Spanish: Río Guayanés), is a river of Peñuelas, Puerto Rico. Its source lies in the western Cordillera Central in barrio Jaguas of Peñuelas, crossing the municipality from north to south and passing Peñuelas Pueblo before flowing into the Tallaboa River. The river is the source of a local Romeo and Juliet-like legend.

== See also ==
- List of rivers of Puerto Rico
