= Félix Aguilar Observatory =

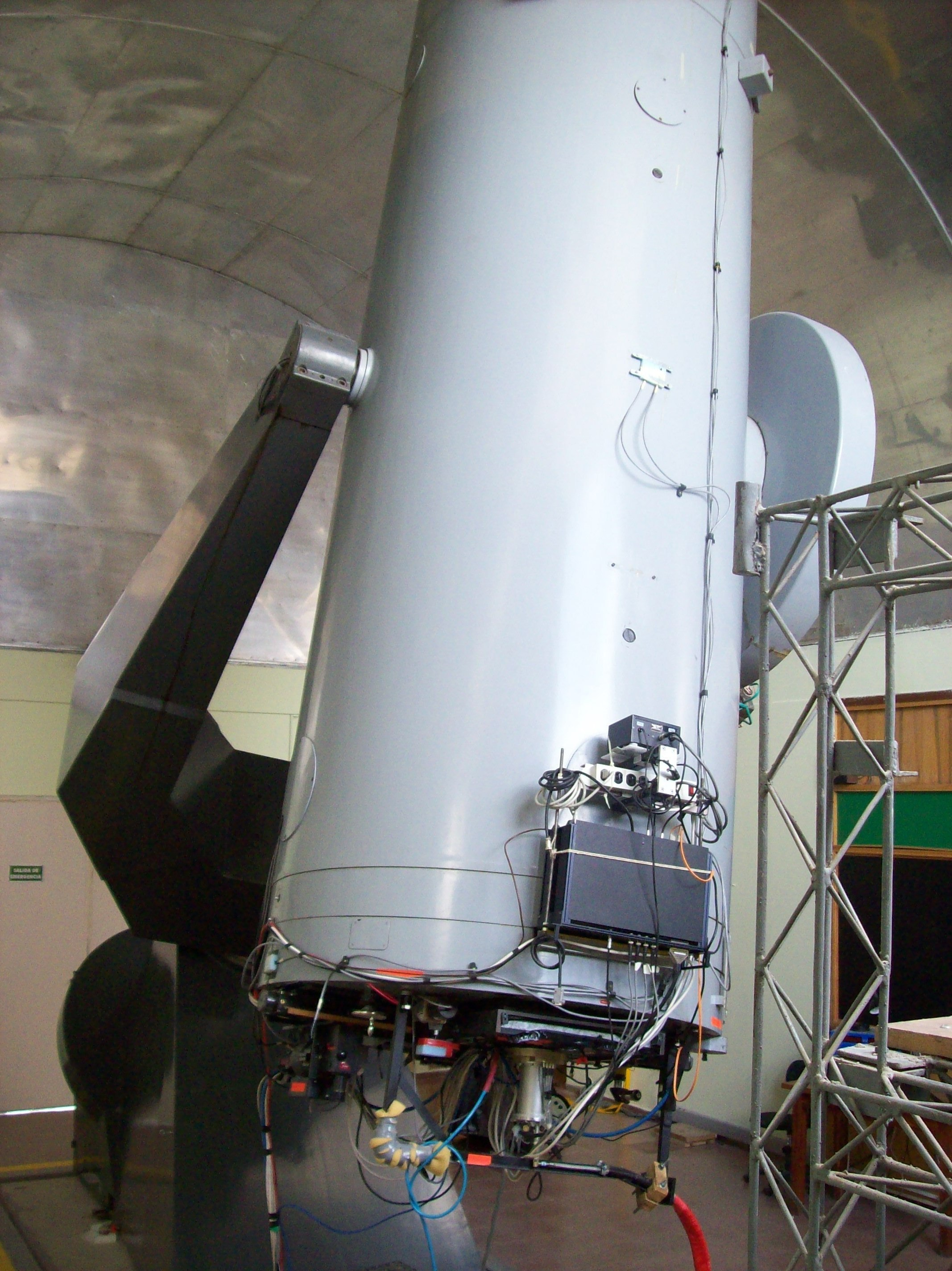
- Alternative names: Felix Aguilar Observatory
- Named after: Félix Aguilar
- Organization: National University of San Juan
- Observatory code: 808
- Location: San Juan Province, Argentina
- Coordinates: 31.8023°S 69.3265°W
- Altitude: 2,420 meters (7,940 ft)
- Established: 1960
- Website: www.oafa.fcefn.unsj-cuim.edu.ar

Telescopes
- unnamed telescope: 0.8 m reflector
- unnamed double astrograph: 0.5 m solar telescope (×2)
- Mirror Coronagraph for Argentina: solar telescope
- H-Alpha Solar Telescope of Argentina: solar telescope
- ROA Automated Meridian Telescope: astrograph
- Related media on Commons

Félix Aguilar Observatory (Spanish: Observatorio Astronómico Félix Aguilar [oβseɾβaˈtoɾjo astɾoˈnomiko ˈfeliɣs aɣiˈlaɾ]; OAFA) is an astronomical observatory established in 1953, in San Juan Province, Argentina. In 1974, it was renamed to Carlos Ulrrico Cesco Astronomical Station (Spanish: Estación Astronómica Carlos Ulrrico Cesco [estaˈθjon astɾoˈnomika ˈkaɾlos ulˈriko ˈθesko]; EACUC).

Its primary observing facility is located in El Leoncito National Park in the west of San Juan Province. Also located in El Leoncito Park is the Leoncito Astronomical Complex. The observatory is operated by the School of Physical and Natural Sciences at the National University of San Juan in San Juan, Argentina. The original OAFA observatory buildings are located at the west end of the city.

OAFA is named after Félix Aguilar (1884–1943), an Argentine astronomer and engineer who was director of the La Plata Astronomical Observatory from 1919 to 1921, and again from 1934 until his death. EACUC was renamed after Carlos Ulrrico Cesco on the 25th anniversary of the beginning of observations in honour of his contributions to the founding and operation of the observatory.

The main-belt asteroid 3083 OAFA, was named after the discovery of the Felix Aguilar Observatory. The official naming citation was published on 21 November 1991 (M.P.C. 19333).

== History ==
In 1947, research started at the Lick Observatory in California to study the Northern Milky Way's structure by determining the accurate positions and apparent motions of stars. There was a need to extend that investigation to the Southern Hemisphere, and in 1960, Yale University obtained initial funding of 750 k$ for the purpose of building a southern observatory for that purpose from the Ford Foundation. Following a survey of potential sites, the observatory was built at El Leoncito, Argentina, near Barreal in the province of San Juan, in the eastern foothills of the Andes mountains at an elevation of approximately 2400 m (8000 ft). The site was provided under a long-term lease by the University of Cuyo and the observatory was jointly operated by the University of Cuyo's Observatorio Astronómico "Félix Aguilar" (OAFA) in San Juan and the Yale-Columbia Southern Observatory, Inc (YCSO). A residence was constructed adjacent to the grounds of the OAFA in San Juan for the technical support and housing of the YCSO personnel while they were in San Juan.

The first survey of the Southern sky was made between the years 1965 and 1974, with the financial support of the National Science Foundation (NSF). During that period, the US Naval Observatory (USNO) relocated a meridian circle telescope to El Leoncito to extend their catalogue of stellar positions to the Southern Hemisphere. The USNO returned that telescope to Washington following the completion of its project in 1974. At about the same time, Columbia University withdrew from the YCSO corporation and it became the Yale Southern Observatory, Inc. on January 23, 1975.

About two years earlier, the University of Cuyo had split into several regionally based units. The one based in San Juan became known as the National University of San Juan (UNSJ) and it assumed the administration of the OAFA and partnership with the YCSO and then the YSO. In 1990 the El Leoncito Observatory was renamed The Dr. Carlos U. Cesco Observatory on the occasion of the 25th anniversary of the beginning of observations, in honour of Dr. Cesco's many contributions to the founding and operation of the Observatory.

During the period 1974-1983, El Leoncito was run by OAFA under the terms of an agreement signed by the OAFA and the YSO. In 1983, a new ten-year agreement was negotiated that allowed the Southern Sky survey to be repeated, and this was again extended for another ten-year period in 1993. Repeat observations for the survey began in 1987, but Eastman Kodak stopped making the photographic plates used in the survey after only one-third of the second epoch photography had been completed; in 1997 the NSF funded a CCD detector system to replace the photographic plates, and preliminary observations with it began after it was installed in March 1999.

== Telescopes ==
The principal telescope of EACUC is a double astrograph consisting of two lenses each 20-inches (50.8 cm) in diameter, one designed for blue light and the other for yellow light. The lenses focus the light separately onto two photographic plates with dimensions of 17×17 inches (43×43 cm). The photographic plates are purchased in the U.S., shipped to Argentina, exposed in the telescope, developed, and then shipped back to the U.S. In New Haven, Connecticut, the plates are measured with a precision measuring machine.

In 2025, Argentina suspended construction of the China Argentina Radio Telescope at the Félix Aguilar Observatory due to U.S. concerns about dual-use.

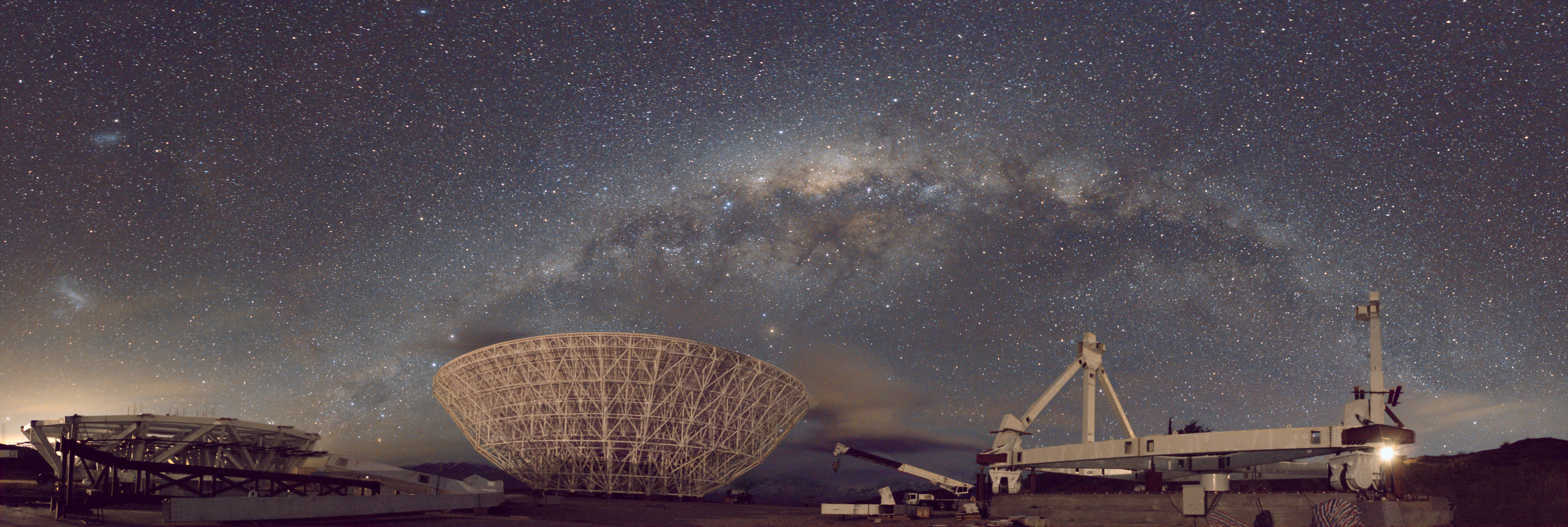
The China Argentina Radio Telescope under construction

== See also ==
- Leoncito Astronomical Complex
- Argentine National Observatory
- List of astronomical observatories
