= El Leoncito National Park =

National Park in Argentina

- Parque Nacional El Leoncito
- IUCN category II (national park)
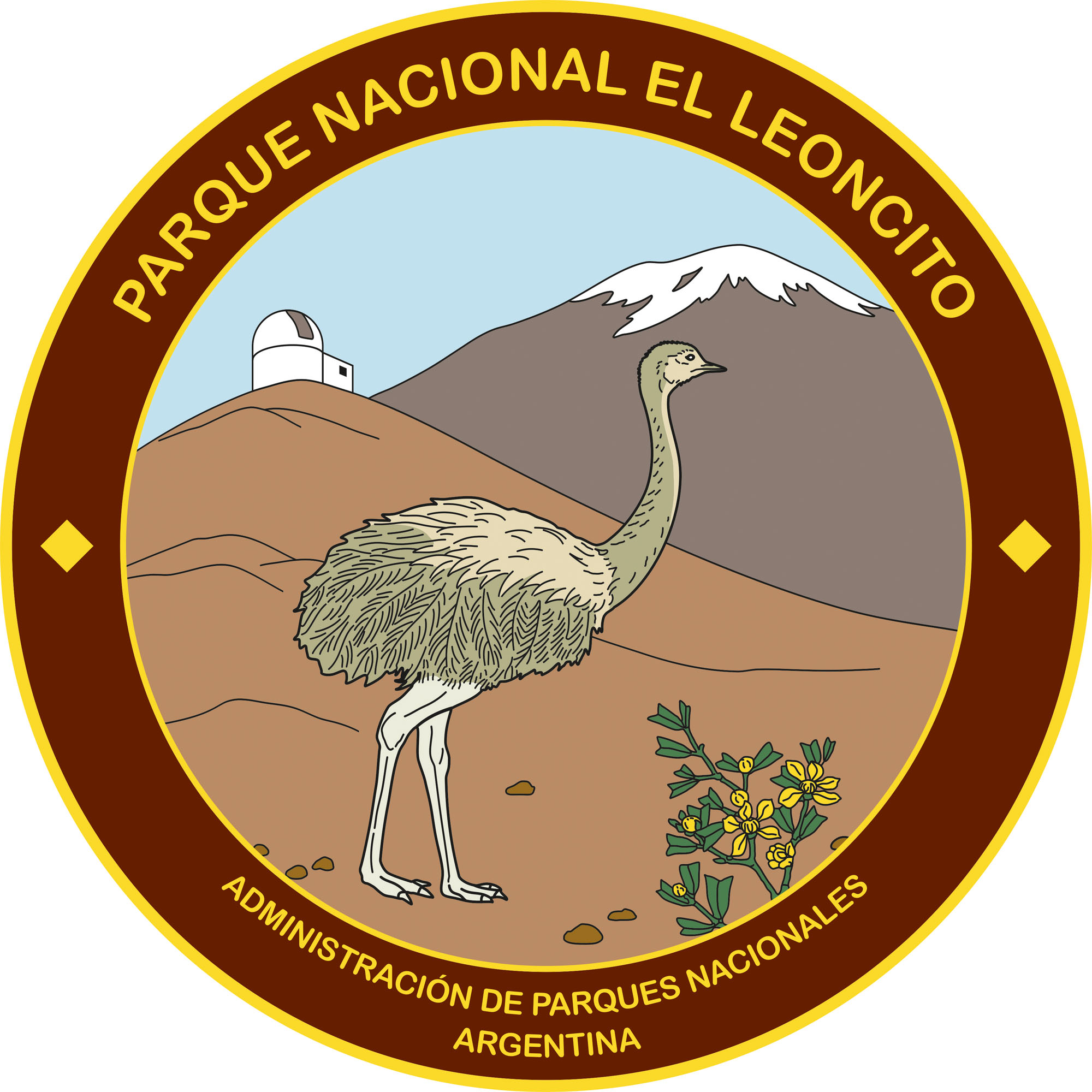
- Emblem of the El Leoncito National Park

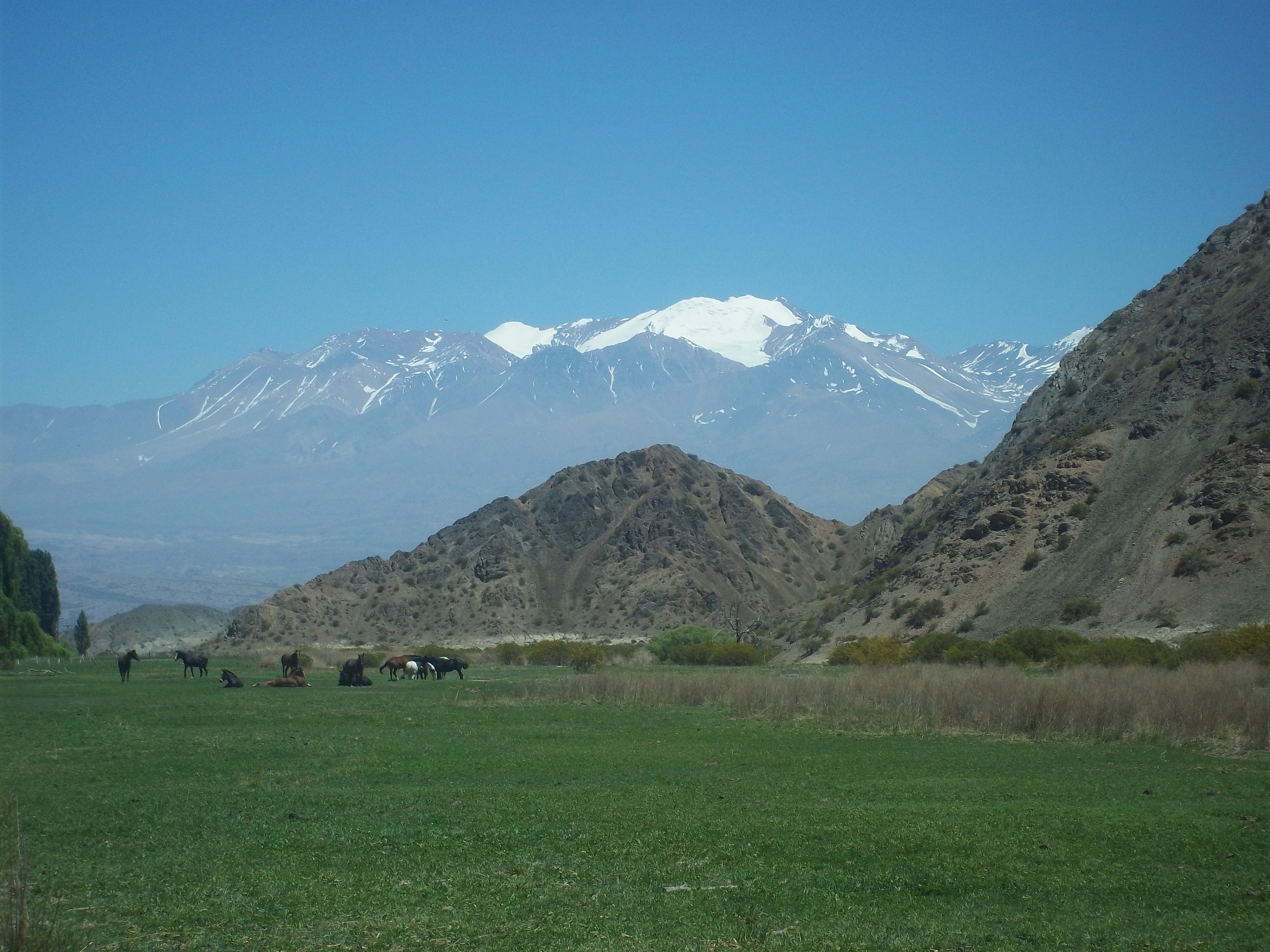
- Horses roaming in the park with snow-capped Andes in the distance

- Location within Argentina
- Location: San Juan Province, Argentina
- Nearest city: Barreal
- Coordinates: 31°48′S 69°22′W
- Area: 89,706 ha (346.36 sq mi)
- Established: September 18, 2002
- Governing body: Argentine National Parks Administration

El Leoncito National Park (Spanish: Parque Nacional El Leoncito) is a federal protected area in San Juan Province, Argentina. Established on 18 September 2002, it houses a representative sample of the Central Andean Puna and the Southern Andean steppe biodiversity in good state of conservation, as well as historical and paleontological sites (including a portion of the Inca road system). It has an area of 89,706 ha (897.06 km^{2}; 346.36 sq mi)

== Description ==
El Leoncito is located on the western slopes of the Sierra del Tontal in the Calingasta Department, 34 km (21 mi) from Barreal.

The lack of atmospheric pollution in this isolated place and the dry weather guarantee at least 300 days of unmatched sky transparency per year, making it particularly suitable for astronomy research: within the park there are two astronomical observatories: the Leoncito Astronomical Complex (CASLEO) and the Félix Aguilar Observatory (2,552 m (8,373 ft) above sea level)

The area of the current national park lay within the jurisdiction of the aforementioned Leoncito Astronomical Complex, under the Ministry of Science, Technology and Innovation. Safeguarding the atmospheric quality was a central concern for the astronomical center, which in turn required careful administration of the ecological environment. Thus in 1994 it was decided to place the area under management of the National Parks Administration as a strict natural reserve. On 18 September 2002 it was further promoted to national park status with the enactment of national law 25656 after its territory was ceded by the San Juan Province to the federal state.

The climate is cold, with permanent ice in the high Andean region. In the Puna the weather is cold and very dry with large temperature amplitude. Overall, the average annual rainfall is 200 mm (7.9 in).

The park has almost no infrastructure for tourists, so it is recommended to stock up before visiting. There is free camping with a stove, tables, grills, barbecue, toilets and hot showers. Besides visiting the astronomical observatories, there are trails to local water streams and waterfalls, most of them of low difficulty and short length.

El Leoncito National Park scenery

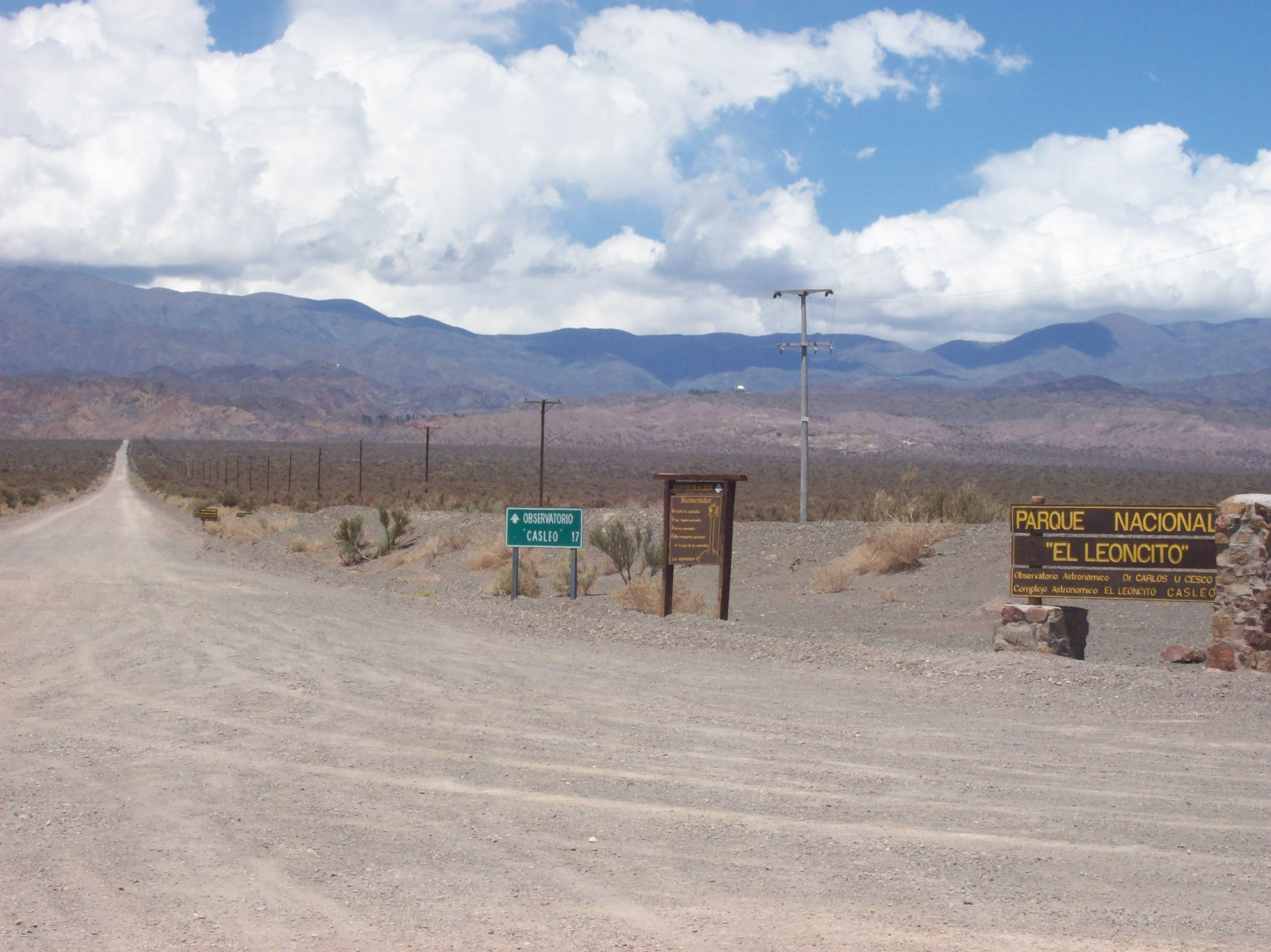
Road access to the park. In the background, the Sierra del Tontal

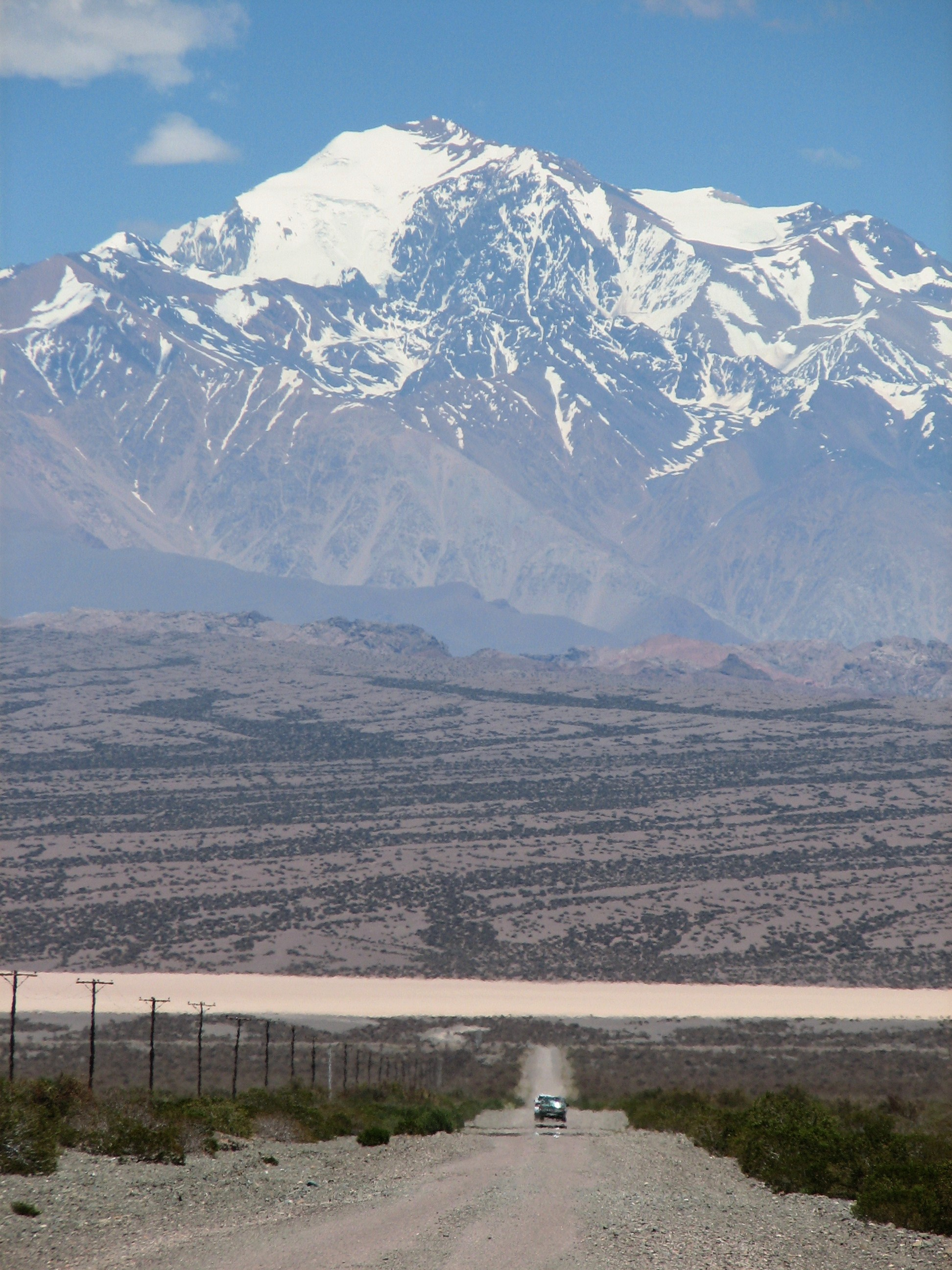
Pampa del Leoncito and Cerro Mercedario in the background

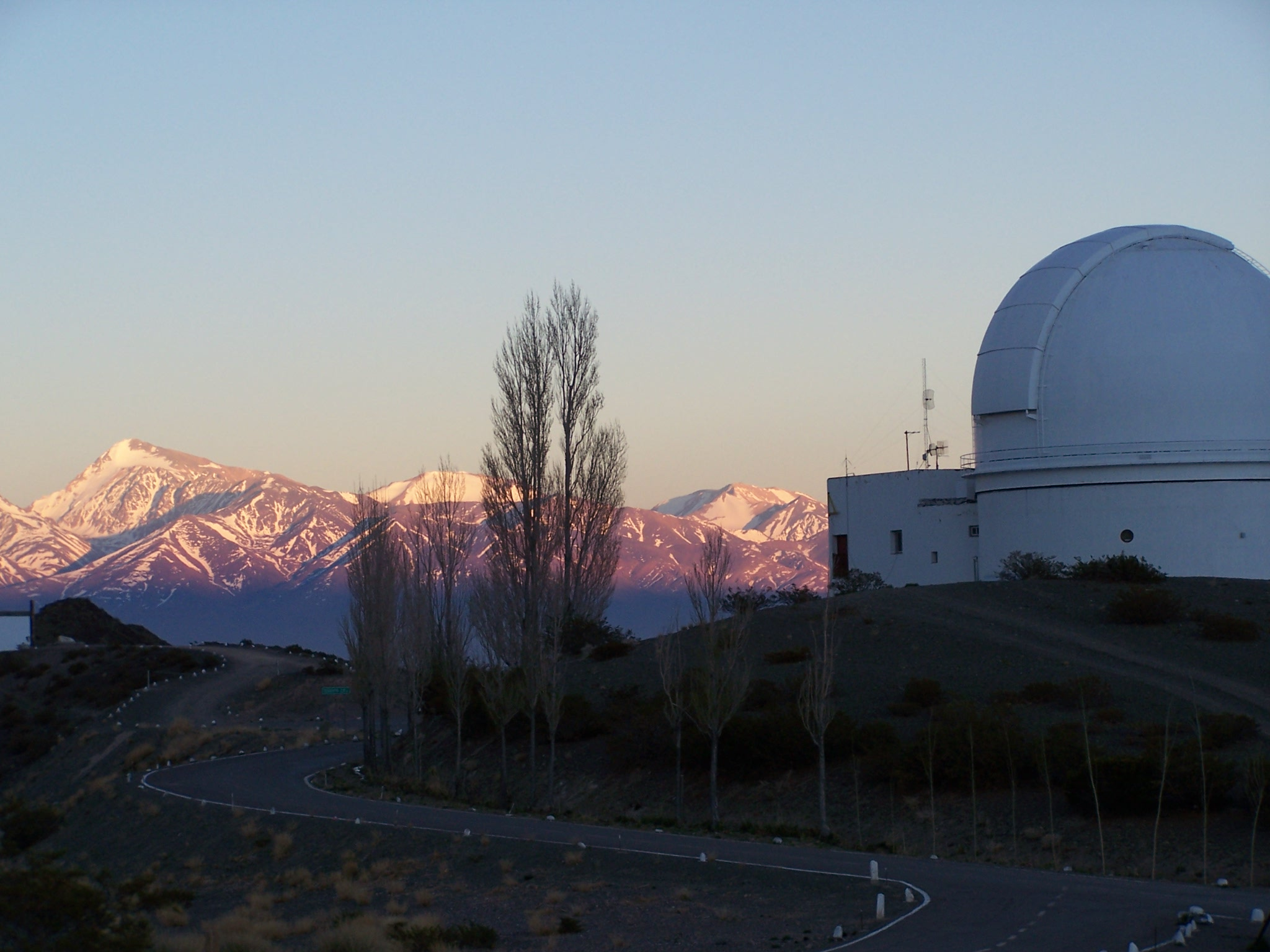
Leoncito Astronomical Complex at dawn

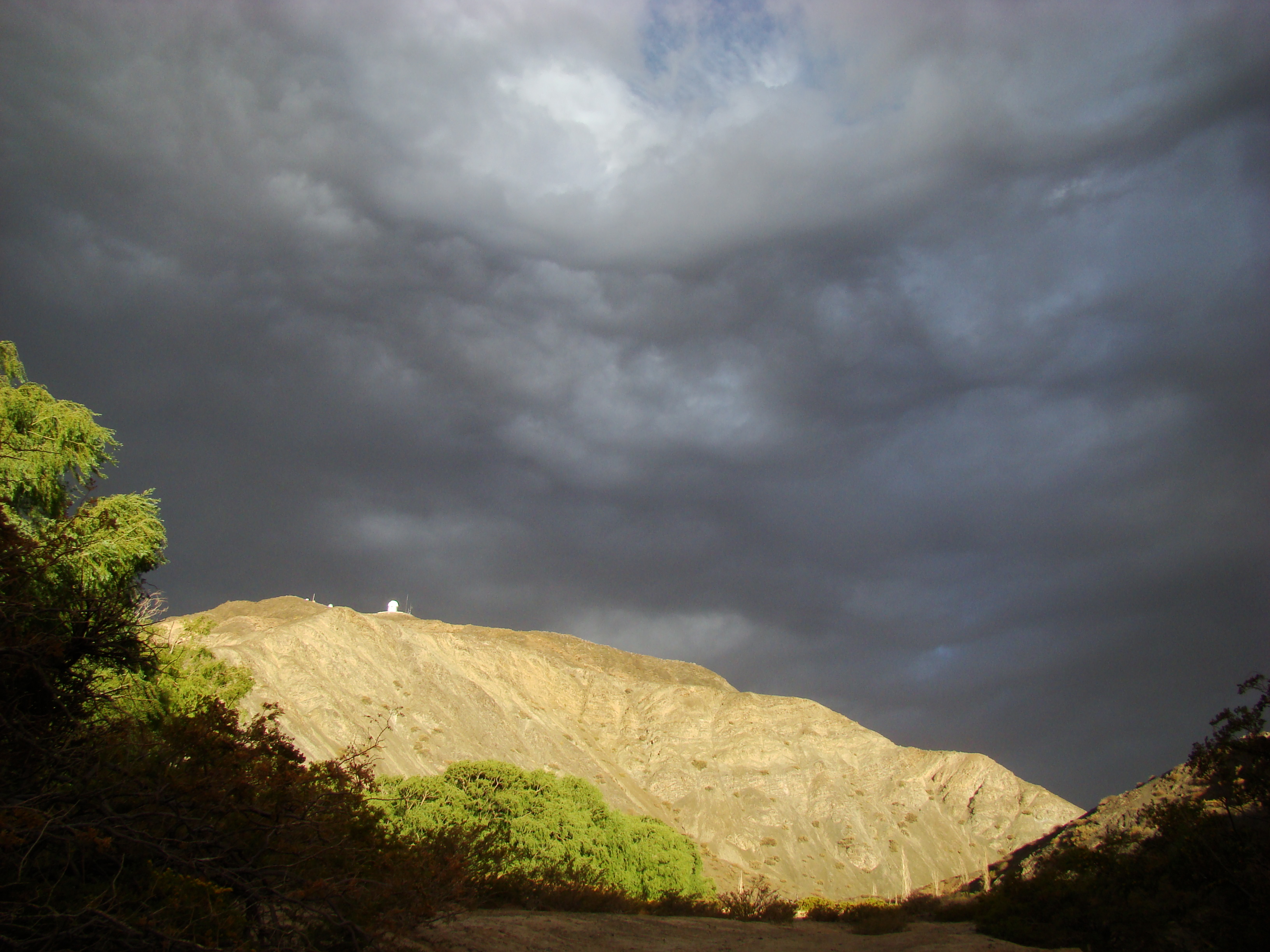
Astronomy research facilities

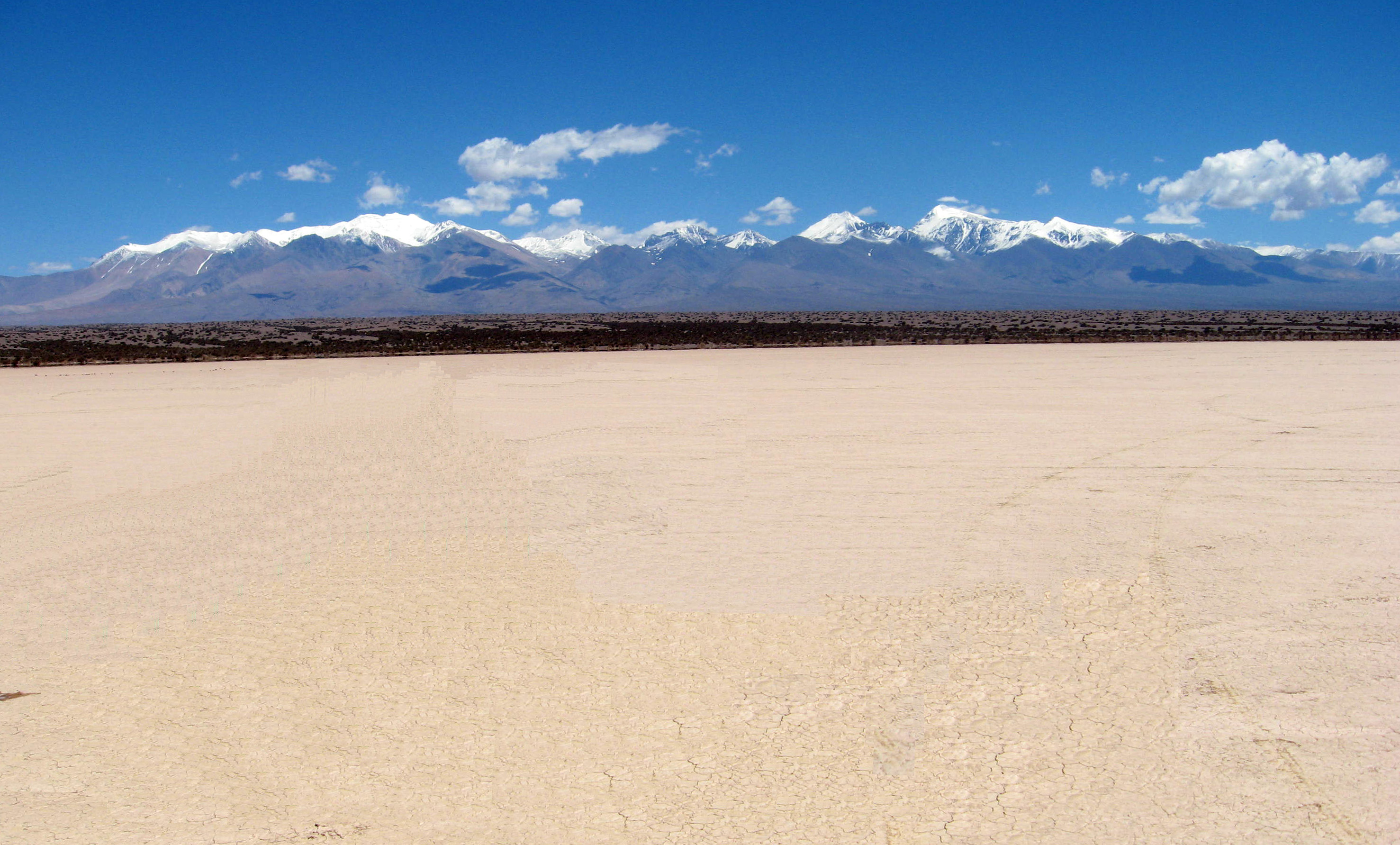
Pampa del Leoncito

== Biodiversity ==
The flora is mostly made up of shrubs, typical of dry mountainous areas. The fauna include important species like the guanaco and birds of prey such as the peregrine falcon.
