= Puerto Rico Highway 516 =

Highway in Puerto Rico

Highway 516
- Ruta 516

Route information
- Maintained by Puerto Rico DTPW
- Length: 3.1 km (1.9 mi)

Major junctions
- West end: Sector Santas Pascuas in Rucio–Guaraguao
- PR-391 in Rucio–Guaraguao
- East end: PR-123 in Guaraguao

Location
- Country: United States
- Territory: Puerto Rico
- Municipalities: Peñuelas, Ponce

Highway system
- Roads in Puerto Rico; List
← PR-515	→ PR-518

Puerto Rico Highway 516 (PR-516) is a tertiary state highway in the northern area of barrio Guaraguao in Ponce, Puerto Rico, near Ponce's border with Adjuntas's barrio Portugués. The road travels east to west. It starts at its intersection with PR-123 and heads west to end at Ponce's border with Peñuelas, from where PR-391 picks up into the municipality of Peñuelas. The road runs through dense mountain vegetation into the interior regions of barrio Guaraguao.

== Major intersections ==
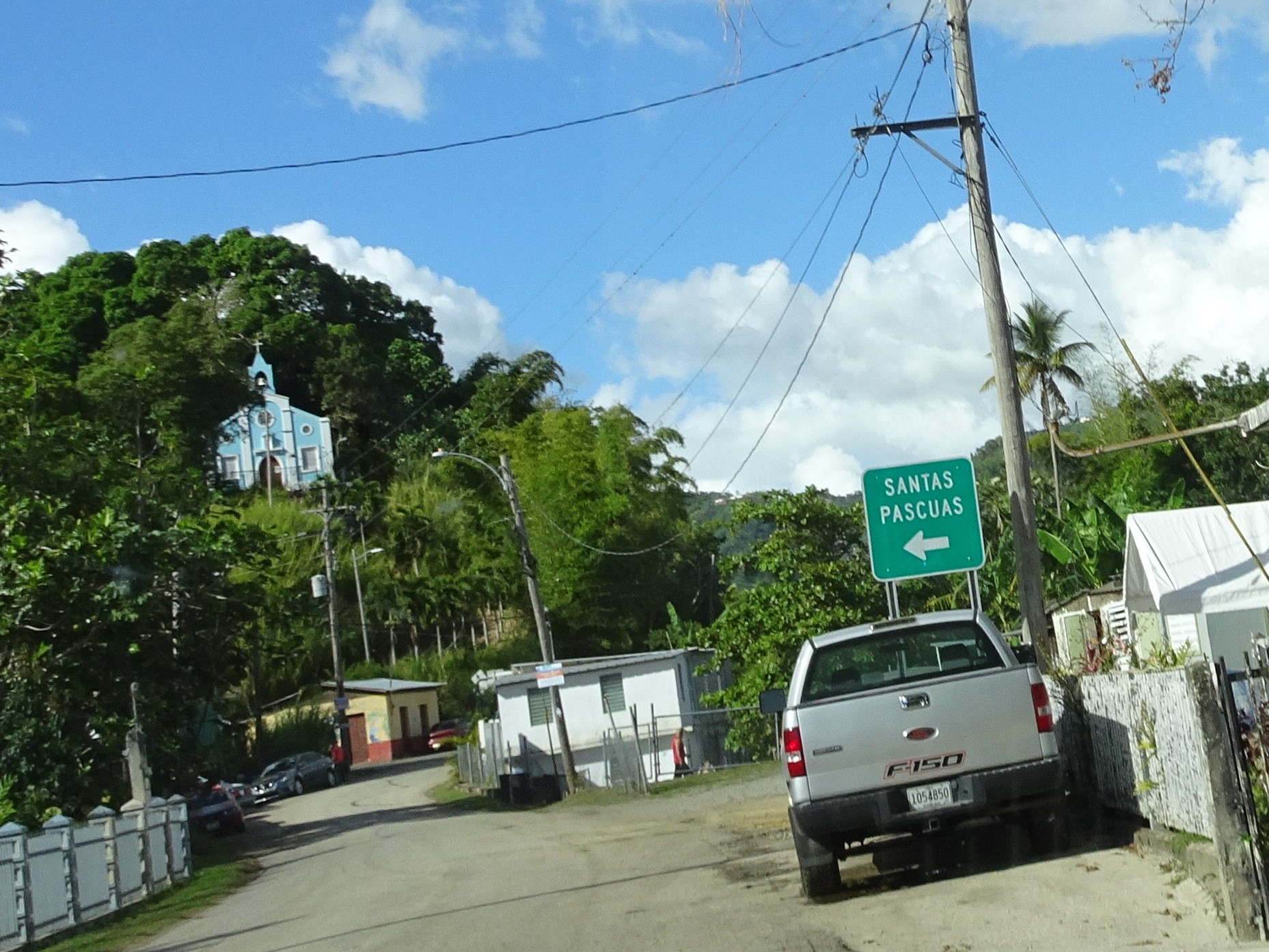
PR-123 north near its junction with PR-516

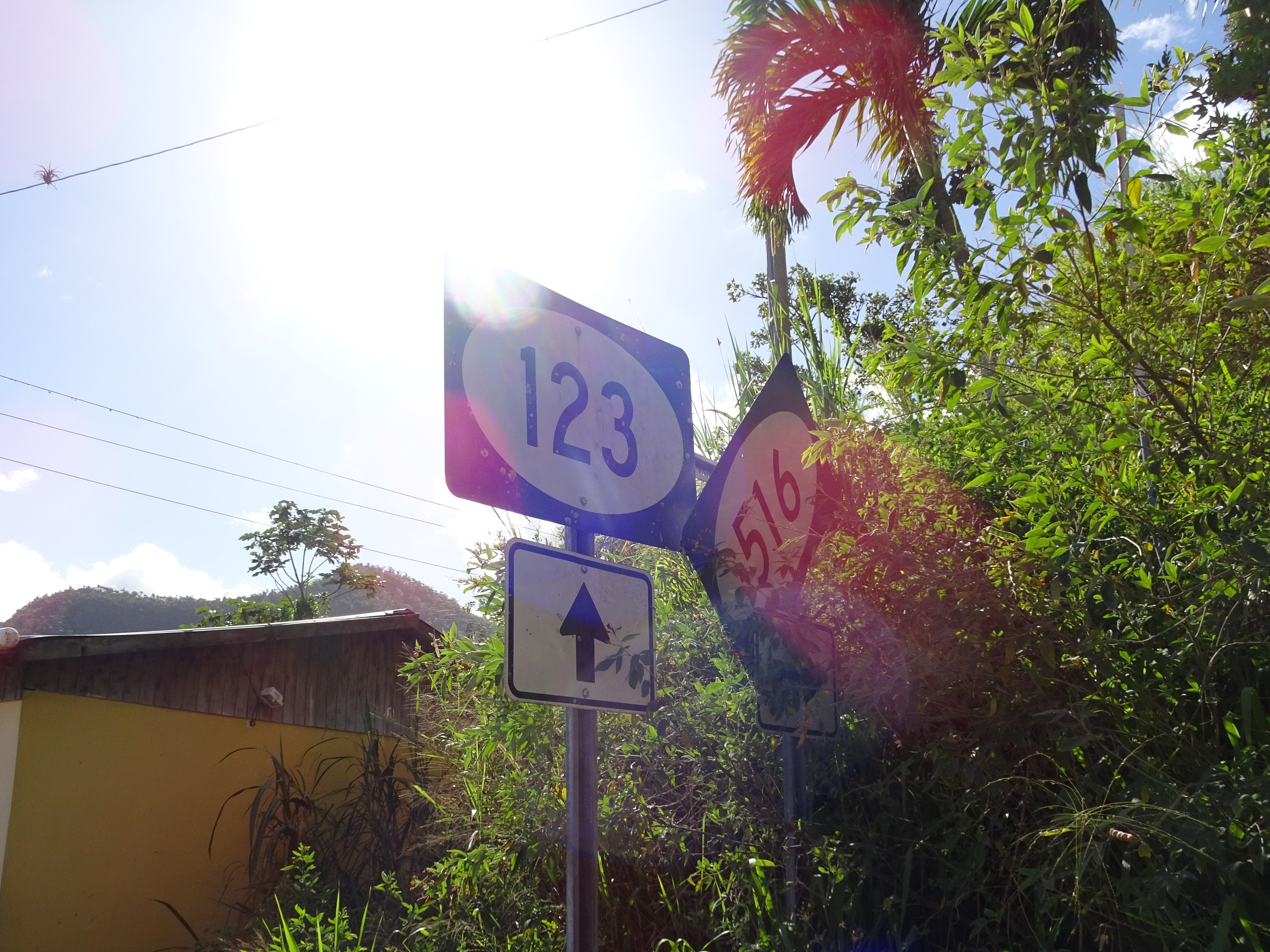
PR-123 south at its junction with PR-516

Municipality	Location	km	mi	Destinations	Notes
Peñuelas–Ponce municipal line	Rucio–Guaraguao line	3.1	1.9	Western terminus of PR-516 at Sector Santas Pascuas	
Peñuelas–Ponce municipal line	Rucio–Guaraguao line	2.7	1.7	PR-391 – Peñuelas	
Ponce	Guaraguao	0.0	0.0	PR-123 – Ponce, Adjuntas	Eastern terminus of PR-516
1.000 mi = 1.609 km; 1.000 km = 0.621 mi

== See also ==
- List of highways in Ponce, Puerto Rico
