= List of highways numbered 516 =

The following highways are numbered 516:

== Canada ==
- Ontario Highway 516

== United Kingdom ==
- A516 road

== United States ==
- Interstate 516
- New Mexico State Road 516
- Pennsylvania Route 516
- Florida State Road 516

Territories

- Puerto Rico Highway 516

Preceded by 515	Lists of highways 516	Succeeded by 517
