= Peñuelas barrio-pueblo =

Historical and administrative center (seat) of Peñuelas, Puerto Rico

Peñuelas barrio-pueblo Pueblo de Peñuelas
- Municipality Seat
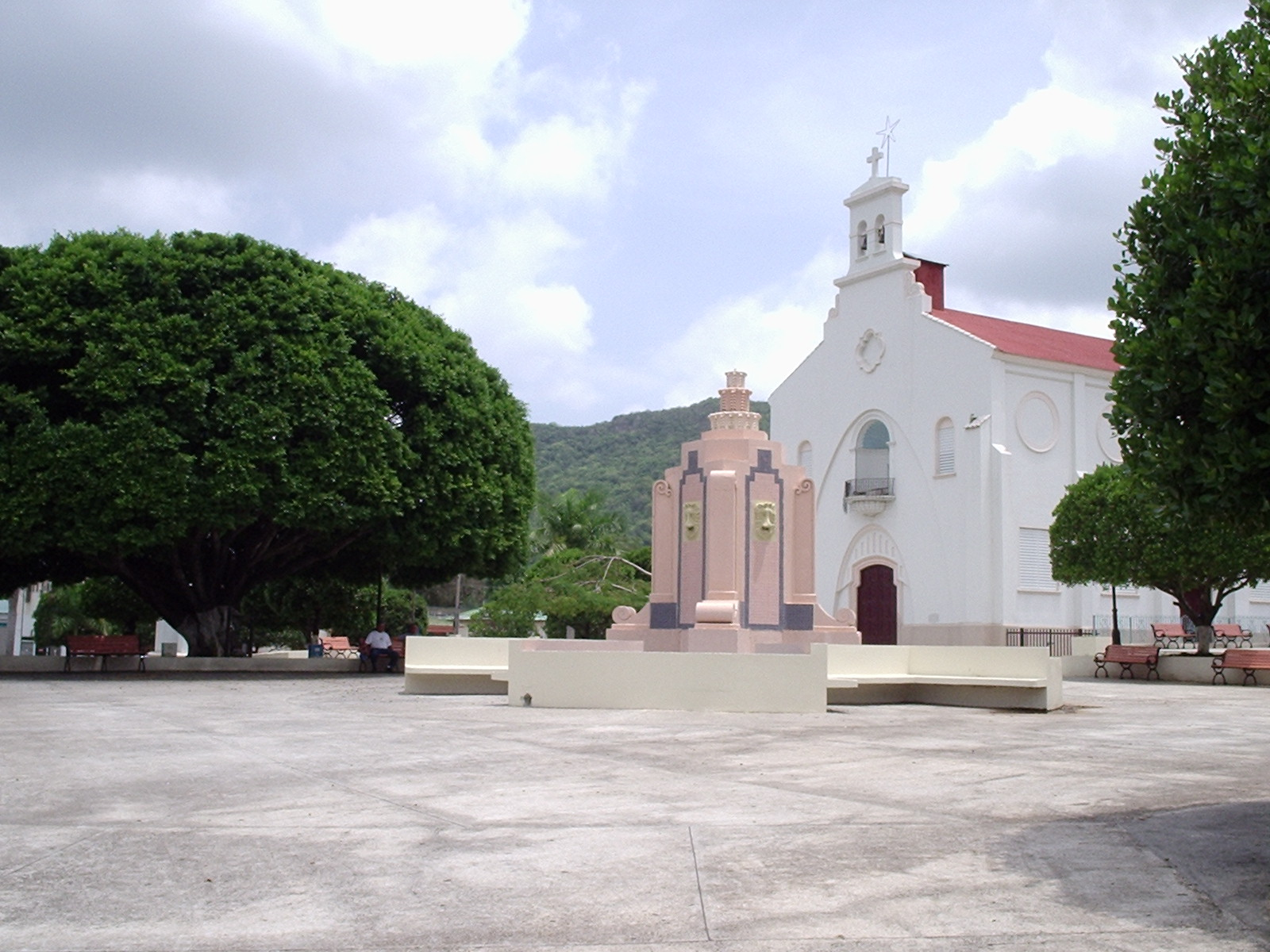
- Parroquia San José, and plaza

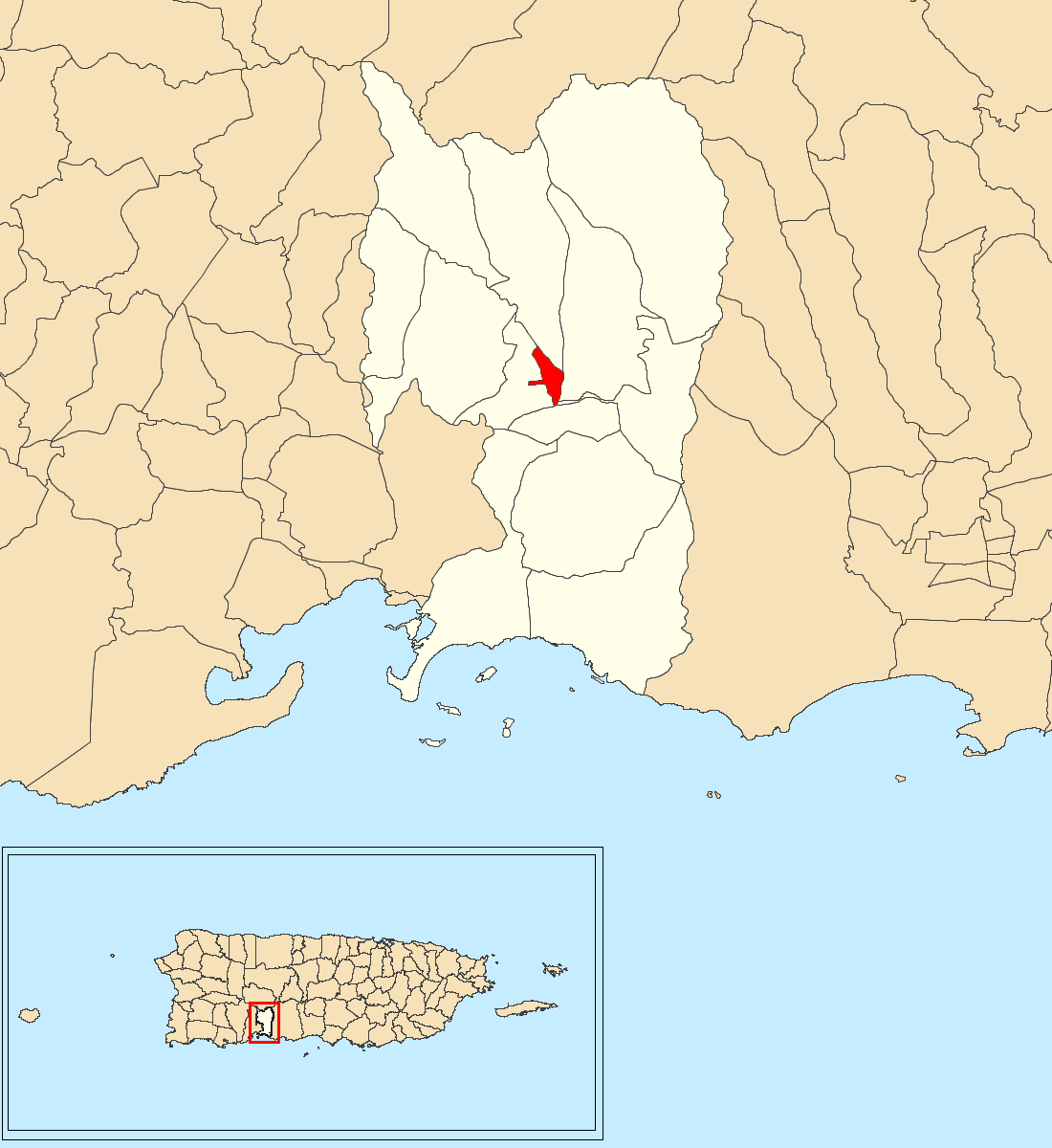
- Location of Peñuelas barrio-pueblo within the municipality of Peñuelas shown in red

- Location of Puerto Rico
- Coordinates: 18°03′26″N 66°43′21″W
- Commonwealth: Puerto Rico
- Municipality: Peñuelas

Area
  - Total: 0.25 sq mi (0.65 km^{2})
  - Land: 0.25 sq mi (0.65 km^{2})
  - Water: 0 sq mi (0 km^{2})
- Elevation: 203 ft (62 m)

Population (2010)
  - Total: 1,422
  - Density: 5,688/sq mi (2,196/km^{2})
- Source: 2010 Census
- Time zone: UTC−4 (AST)

Peñuelas barrio-pueblo is a barrio and the administrative center (seat) of Peñuelas, a municipality of Puerto Rico. Its population in 2010 was 1,422.

As was customary in Spain, in Puerto Rico, the municipality has a barrio called pueblo which contains a central plaza, the municipal buildings (city hall), and a Catholic church. Fiestas patronales (patron saint festivals) are held in the central plaza every year.

== The central plaza and its church ==
The central plaza, or square, is a place for official and unofficial recreational events and a place where people can gather and socialize from dusk to dawn. The Laws of the Indies, Spanish law, which regulated life in Puerto Rico in the early 19th century, stated the plaza's purpose was for "the parties" (celebrations, festivities) (Spanish: a propósito para las fiestas), and that the square should be proportionally large enough for the number of neighbors (Spanish: grandeza proporcionada al número de vecinos). These Spanish regulations also stated that the streets nearby should be comfortable portals for passersby, protecting them from the elements: sun and rain.

Located across the central plaza in Peñuelas barrio-pueblo is the Parroquia San José, a Roman Catholic church.

== History ==
Peñuelas barrio-pueblo was in Spain's gazetteers until Puerto Rico was ceded by Spain in the aftermath of the Spanish–American War under the terms of the Treaty of Paris of 1898 and became an unincorporated territory of the United States. In 1899, the United States Department of War conducted a census of Puerto Rico finding that the population of Peñuelas Pueblo was 1,129.

Historical population
Census	Pop.	Note	%±
1900	1,129		—
1910	1,042		−7.7%
1920	1,343		28.9%
1930	1,318		−1.9%
1940	1,462		10.9%
1950	2,395		63.8%
1960	2,261		−5.6%
1970	0		−100.0%
1980	2,279		—
1990	1,823		−20.0%
2000	1,609		−11.7%
2010	1,422		−11.6%
U.S. Decennial Census; 1899 (shown as 1900) 1910-1930; 1930-1950 1980-2000 2010

== Gallery ==
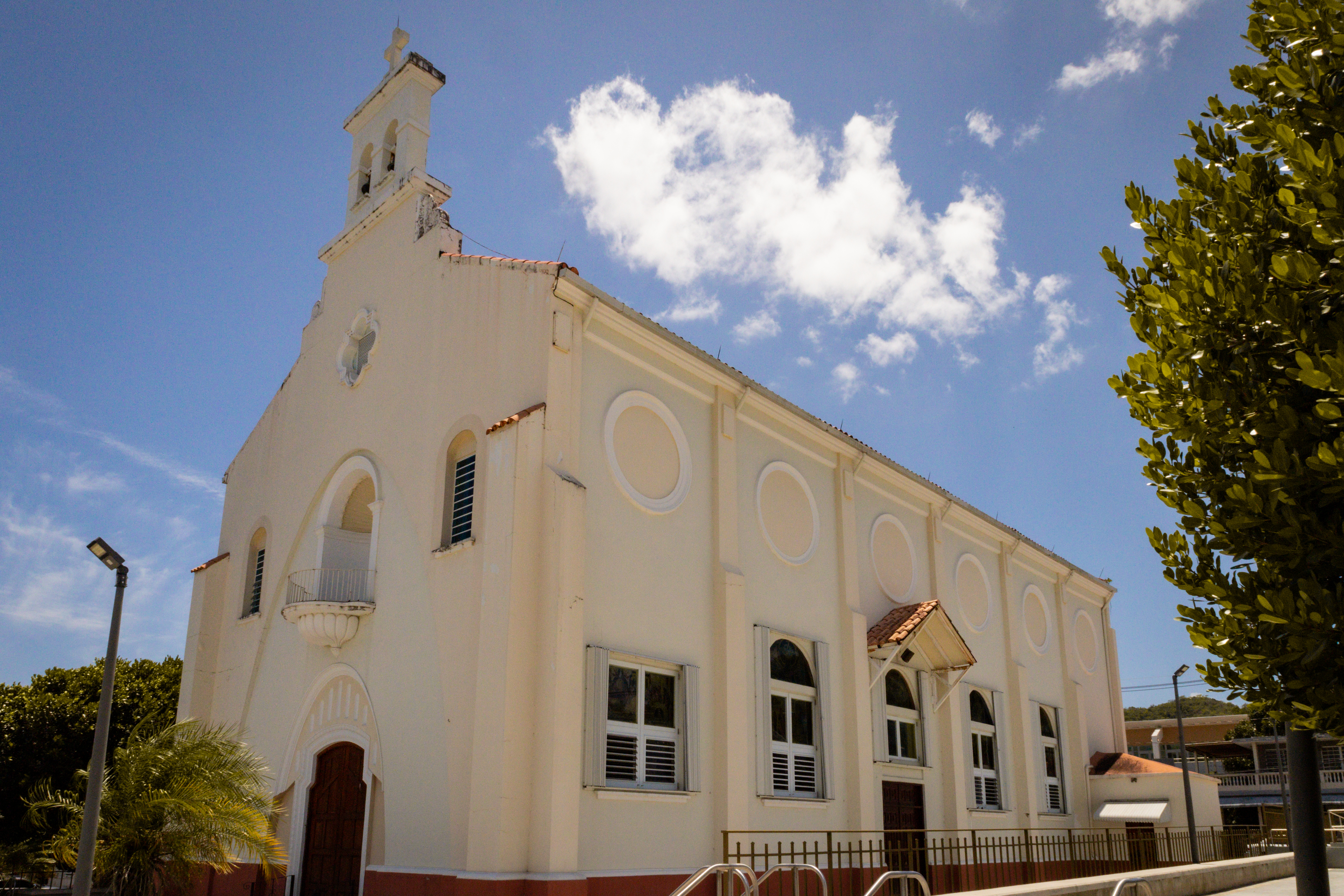
Parroquia San José de Peñuelas

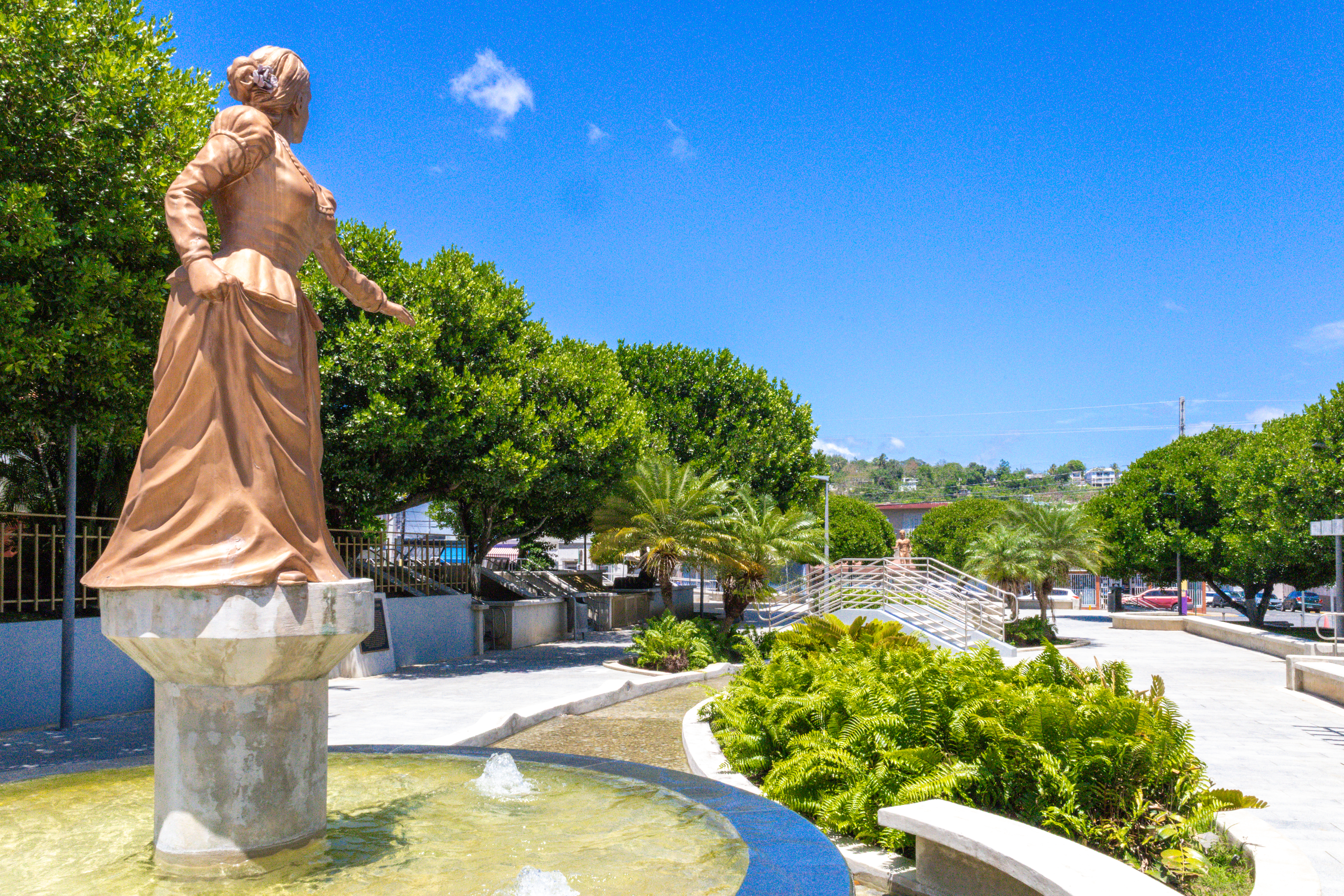
Sculpture dedicated to the legend of the Guayanés.

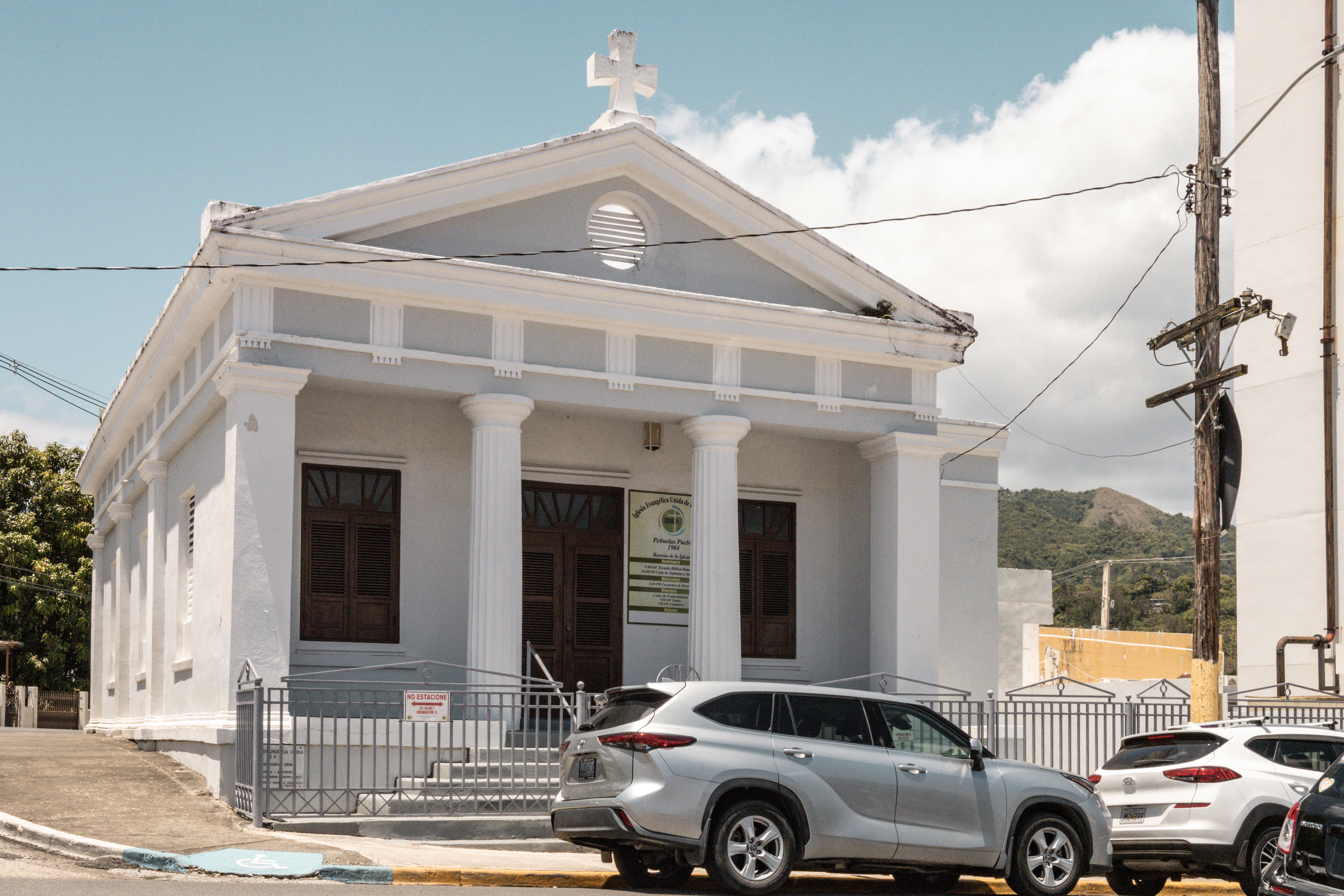
Historic United Evangelical Church

== See also ==
- List of communities in Puerto Rico
