= List of highways numbered 517 =

The following highways are numbered 517:

== Ireland ==
- R517 regional road

== United States ==
- SR 517
- LA 517
- MD 517
- PR-517
- FM 517

Preceded by 516	Lists of highways 517	Succeeded by 518
