= List of highways numbered 515 =

Route 515, or Highway 515, may refer to:

== Afghanistan ==
- Route 515 (Afghanistan) in Farah Province

== Canada ==
- Alberta Highway 515
- New Brunswick Route 515
- Ontario Highway 515 (former)

== India ==
- National Highway 515 (India)

== United Kingdom ==
- A515 road

== United States ==
- Interstate 515 (concurrent with U.S. routes 93 and 95)
- Lake County, California County Route 515
- Brevard, Florida County Route 515
- Georgia State Route 515
- Maryland Route 515
- County Route 515 (New Jersey)
- North Carolina Highway 515 (former)
- Ohio State Route 515
- Pennsylvania Route 515 (former)
- Virginia State Route 515 (former)
- Washington State Route 515

Territories

- Puerto Rico Highway 515

Preceded by 514	Lists of highways 515	Succeeded by 516
