= List of highways numbered 514 =

The following highways are numbered 514:

== Canada ==
- Alberta Highway 514
- Newfoundland and Labrador Route 514
- Ontario Highway 514 (former)

== United States ==
- Florida State Road 514
- Maryland Route 514
- County Route 514
- Ohio State Route 514
- Pennsylvania Route 514
- Puerto Rico Highway 514
- Washington State Route 514 (former)

| Preceded by 513 | Lists of highways 514 | Succeeded by 515 |
