= List of highways numbered 510 =

The following highways are numbered 510:

== Canada ==
- Alberta Highway 510
- New Brunswick Route 510
- Newfoundland and Labrador Route 510
- Ontario Highway 510

== Costa Rica ==
- National Route 510

== Ireland ==
- R510 regional road

== United States ==
- Interstate 510
  - Interstate 510 (Arizona) (cancelled proposal)
- Florida State Road 510
- Maryland Route 510
- County Route 510 (New Jersey)
- Ohio State Route 510
- Washington State Route 510

Territories

- Puerto Rico Highway 510

Preceded by 509	Lists of highways 510	Succeeded by 511
