= Quebrada Ceiba =

Barrio of Peñuelas, Puerto Rico

- Barrio
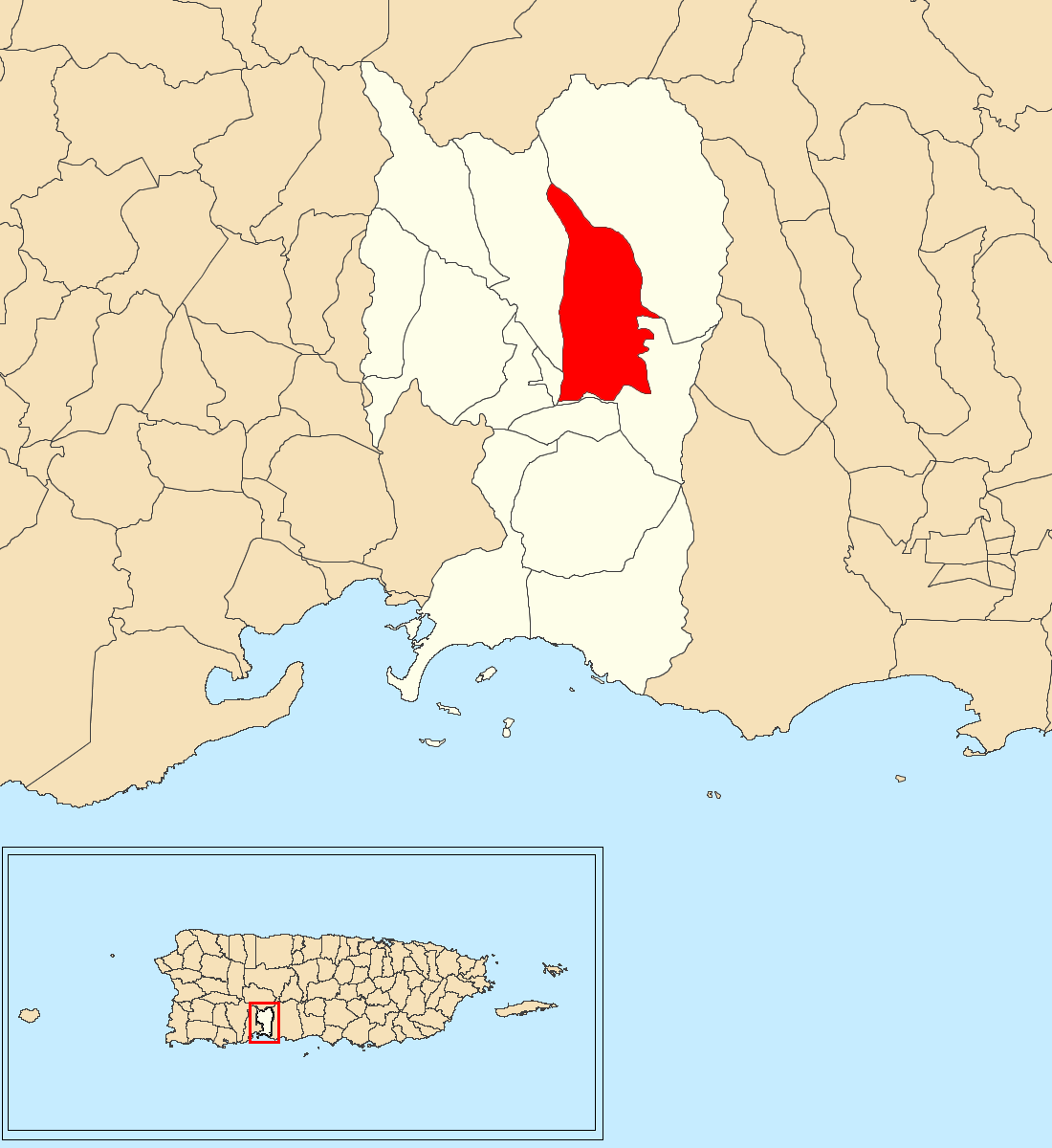
- Location of Quebrada Ceiba within the municipality of Peñuelas shown in red

- Location of Puerto Rico
- Coordinates: 18°04′43″N 66°42′33″W
- Commonwealth: Puerto Rico
- Municipality: Peñuelas

Area
  - Total: 3.88 sq mi (10.0 km^{2})
  - Land: 3.88 sq mi (10.0 km^{2})
  - Water: 0 sq mi (0 km^{2})
- Elevation: 571 ft (174 m)

Population (2010)
  - Total: 4,731
- Source: 2010 Census
- Time zone: UTC−4 (AST)

Quebrada Ceiba is a barrio in the municipality of Peñuelas, Puerto Rico. Its population in 2010 was 4,731.

== History ==
Quebrada Ceiba was in Spain's gazetteers until Puerto Rico was ceded by Spain in the aftermath of the Spanish–American War under the terms of the Treaty of Paris of 1898 and became an unincorporated territory of the United States. In 1899, the United States Department of War conducted a census of Puerto Rico finding that the population of Quebrada Ceiba barrio was 1,006.

Historical population
Census	Pop.	Note	%±
1900	1,006		—
1910	1,070		6.4%
1920	1,405		31.3%
1930	1,421		1.1%
1940	1,711		20.4%
1950	1,701		−0.6%
1960	1,219		−28.3%
1970	1,268		4.0%
1980	2,892		128.1%
1990	5,080		75.7%
2000	5,345		5.2%
2010	4,731		−11.5%
U.S. Decennial Census; 1899 (shown as 1900) 1910-1930; 1930-1950 1980-2000 2010

== See also ==
- List of communities in Puerto Rico
