= List of highways numbered 511 =

The following highways are numbered 511:

== Canada ==
- Alberta Highway 511
- Ontario Highway 511 (former)

== United Kingdom ==
- A511 road

== United States ==
- U.S. Route 511 (former)
- Florida State Road 511 (former)
- County Road 511 (Brevard County, Florida)
- Nevada State Route 511 (former)
- County Route 511 (New Jersey)
- Ohio State Route 511
- Farm to Market Road 511

Territories

- Puerto Rico Highway 511

Preceded by 510	Lists of highways 511	Succeeded by 512
