= List of highways numbered 513 =

The following highways are numbered 513:

== Canada ==
- Alberta Highway 513
- Manitoba Provincial Road 513
- Newfoundland and Labrador Route 513
- Ontario Highway 513 (former)

== India ==
- National Highway 513 (India)

== United States ==
- Florida State Road 513
- Indiana State Road 513
- Maryland Route 513
- Nevada State Route 513 (former)
- County Route 513 (New Jersey)
- New Mexico State Road 513
- Ohio State Route 513
- Pennsylvania Route 513
- Puerto Rico Highway 513
- Washington State Route 513

Preceded by 512	Lists of highways 513	Succeeded by 514
