= Santo Domingo, Peñuelas, Puerto Rico =

Barrio of Puerto Rico

Santo Domingo
- Barrio
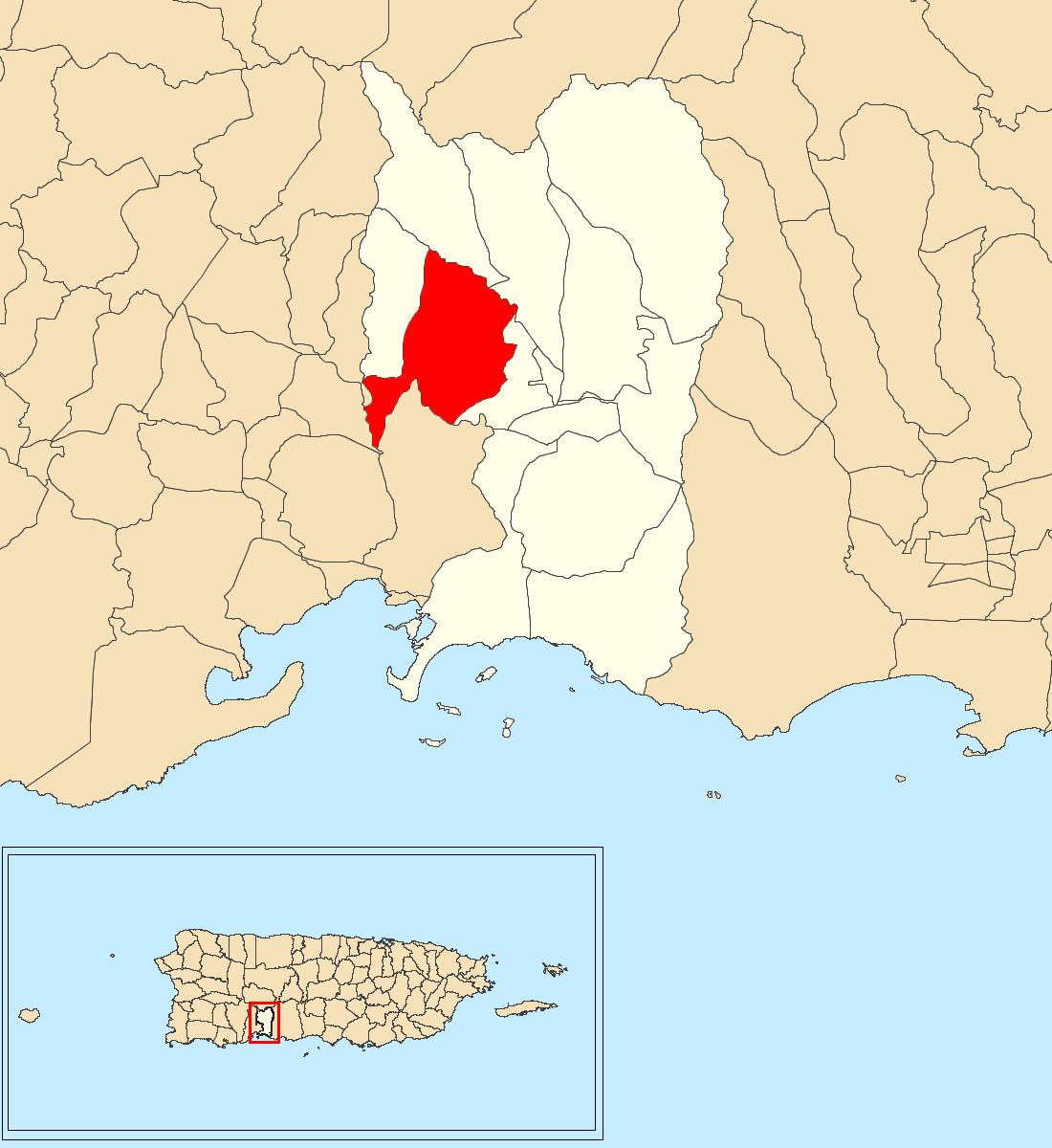
- Location of Santo Domingo within the municipality of Peñuelas shown in red

- Location of Puerto Rico
- Coordinates: 18°03′51″N 66°44′50″W
- Commonwealth: Puerto Rico
- Municipality: Peñuelas

Area
  - Total: 4.01 sq mi (10.4 km^{2})
  - Land: 4.01 sq mi (10.4 km^{2})
  - Water: 0 sq mi (0 km^{2})
- Elevation: 446 ft (136 m)

Population (2010)
  - Total: 5,761
  - Density: 1,436.7/sq mi (554.7/km^{2})
- Source: 2010 Census
- Time zone: UTC−4 (AST)

Santo Domingo is a barrio in the municipality of Peñuelas, Puerto Rico. Its population in 2010 was 5,761.

== Geography ==
The barrio is located near the source of the 2019-20 Puerto Rico earthquakes and suffered from flooding that took place after Hurricane Isaias in 2020.

== History ==
Santo Domingo was in Spain's gazetteers until Puerto Rico was ceded by Spain in the aftermath of the Spanish–American War under the terms of the Treaty of Paris of 1898 and became an unincorporated territory of the United States. In 1899, the United States Department of War conducted a census of Puerto Rico finding that the population of Santo Domingo barrio was 812.

Historical population
Census	Pop.	Note	%±
1900	812		—
1910	962		18.5%
1920	1,062		10.4%
1930	1,105		4.0%
1940	1,469		32.9%
1950	1,847		25.7%
1960	980		−46.9%
1970	2,396		144.5%
1980	3,687		53.9%
1990	5,726		55.3%
2000	6,792		18.6%
2010	5,761		−15.2%
U.S. Decennial Census; 1899 (shown as 1900) 1910-1930; 1930-1950 1980-2000 2010

== Santo Domingo community ==
Santo Domingo is one of several communities located in Santo Domingo barrio. As of 2000, Santo Domingo community had a population of 3,633 living in a land area of 2.14 square miles (5.5 km^{2}).

== See also ==
- List of communities in Puerto Rico
