= Tallaboa Saliente =

Barrio of Peñuelas, Puerto Rico

- Barrio
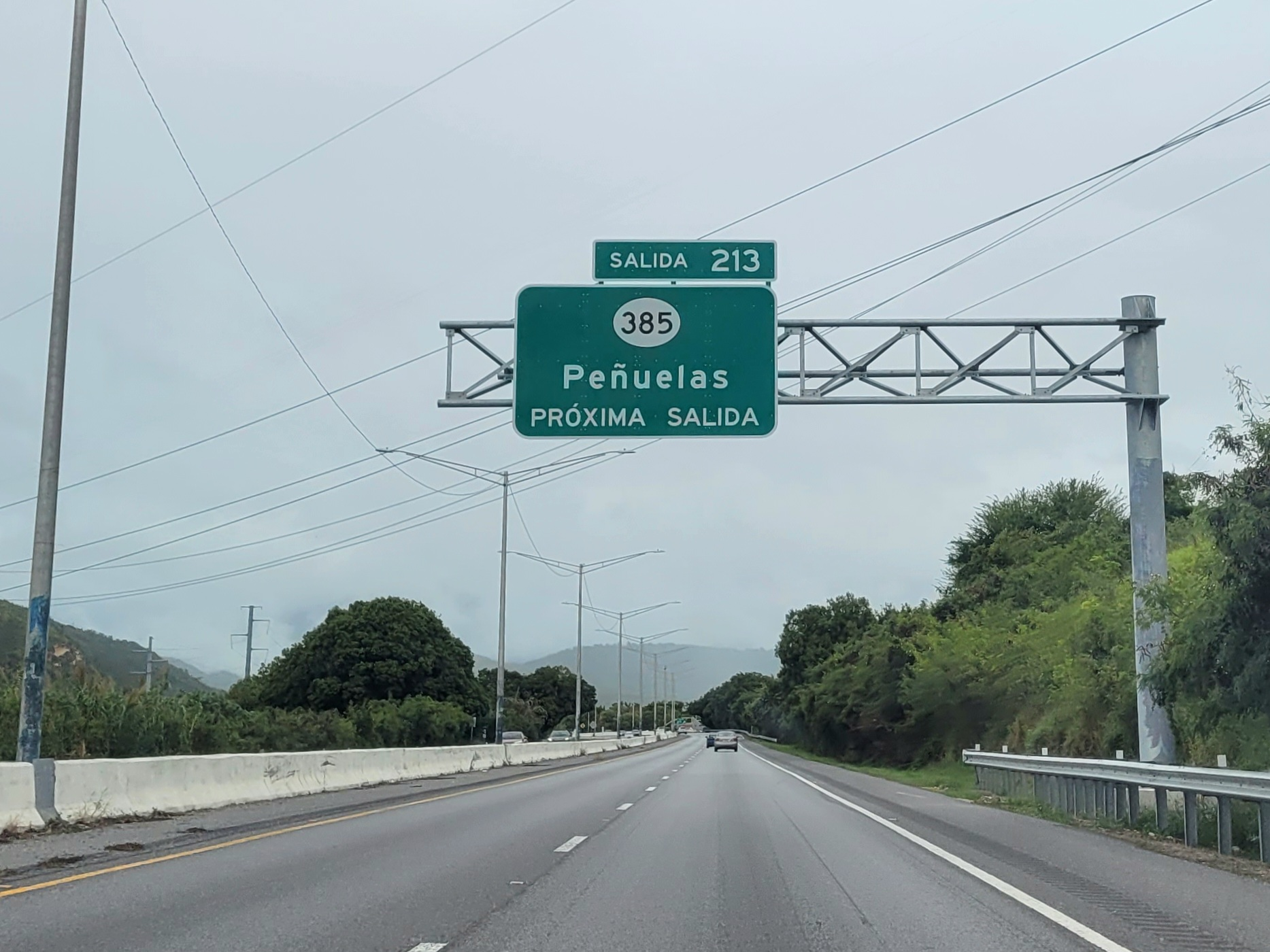
- Puerto Rico Highway 2 between Encarnación and Tallaboa Saliente

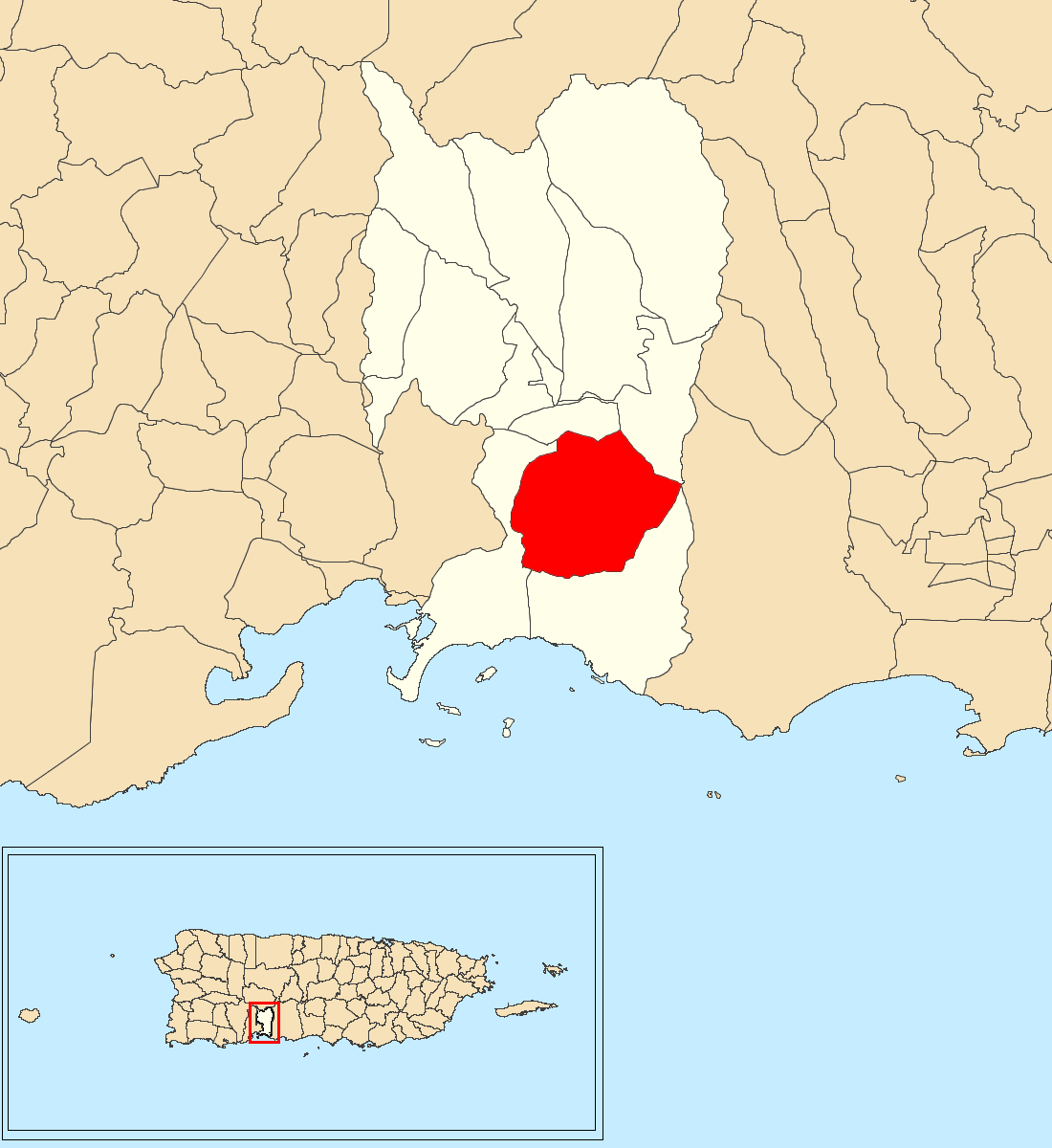
- Location of Tallaboa Saliente within the municipality of Peñuelas shown in red

- Location of Puerto Rico
- Coordinates: 18°01′47″N 66°42′20″W
- Commonwealth: Puerto Rico
- Municipality: Peñuelas

Area
  - Total: 4.80 sq mi (12.4 km^{2})
  - Land: 4.79 sq mi (12.4 km^{2})
  - Water: 0.01 sq mi (0.026 km^{2})
- Elevation: 433 ft (132 m)

Population (2010)
  - Total: 244
  - Density: 50.9/sq mi (19.7/km^{2})
- Source: 2010 Census
- Time zone: UTC−4 (AST)

Tallaboa Saliente is a barrio in the municipality of Peñuelas, Puerto Rico. Its population in 2010 was 244.

== History ==
Tallaboa was an important village, led by "beloved caciques", before the Spanish and European colonization of Puerto Rico in the late 15th century.

Tallaboa Saliente was in Spain's gazetteers until Puerto Rico was ceded by Spain in the aftermath of the Spanish–American War under the terms of the Treaty of Paris of 1898 and became an unincorporated territory of the United States. In 1899, the United States Department of War conducted a census of Puerto Rico finding that the combined population of Tallaboa Saliente and Cuebas barrios was 940.

Historical population
| Census | Pop. | Note | %± |
|---|---|---|---|
| 1910 | 612 | | — |
| 1920 | 383 | | −37.4% |
| 1930 | 419 | | 9.4% |
| 1940 | 343 | | −18.1% |
| 1950 | 518 | | 51.0% |
| 1960 | 673 | | 29.9% |
| 1970 | 758 | | 12.6% |
| 1980 | 678 | | −10.6% |
| 1990 | 354 | | −47.8% |
| 2000 | 342 | | −3.4% |
| 2010 | 244 | | −28.7% |
U.S. Decennial Census; 1900 (N/A) 1910-1930; 1930-1950 1980-2000 2010

== See also ==
- List of communities in Puerto Rico
