= List of highways numbered 512 =

The following highways in the United States are numbered 512:

== United Kingdom ==
- A512 road

== United States ==
- SR 512 / CR 512 (Florida)
- LA 512 (Louisiana)
- MD 512 (former) (Maryland)
- SR 512 (Nevada)
- PA 512 (Pennsylvania)
- PR-512 (Puerto Rico)
- SC 512 (South Carolina)
- FM 512 (Texas)
- SR 512 (Washington)

Preceded by 511	Lists of highways 512	Succeeded by 513
