= List of highways numbered 519 =

The following highways are numbered 519:

== Ireland ==
- R519 Regional Road

== United Kingdom ==
- A519 road

== United States ==
- SR 519
- LA 519
- MD 519 (former)
- PA 519
- PR-519
- FM 519
- SR 519

| Preceded by 518 | Lists of highways 519 | Succeeded by 520 |
