= List of highways numbered 518 =

Route 518, or Highway 518, may refer to:

== Canada ==
- Manitoba Provincial Road 518
- Ontario Highway 518

== United Kingdom ==
- A518 road

== United States ==
- Florida State Road 518
- County Road 518 (Pasco County, Florida)
- Louisiana Highway 518
- Maryland Route 518
- Montana Secondary Highway 518
- Nevada State Route 518
- County Route 518 (New Jersey)
- New Mexico State Road 518
- Ohio State Route 518
- Pennsylvania Route 518
- South Carolina Highway 518 (former)
- Farm to Market Road 518, Texas
- Texas State Highway Loop 518
- Virginia State Route 518 (1928)
- Washington State Route 518

Territories

- Puerto Rico Highway 518

Preceded by 517	Lists of highways 518	Succeeded by 519
