= List of highways numbered 520 =

The following highways are numbered 520:

== Canada ==
- Alberta Highway 520
- Manitoba Provincial Road 520
- Newfoundland and Labrador Route 520
- Highway 520 (Ontario)
- Quebec Autoroute 520

== India ==
- National Highway 520 (India)

== Ireland ==
- R520 regional road

== United Kingdom ==
- A520 road

== United States ==
- Interstate 520
- Florida State Road 520
- Georgia State Route 520
- Indiana State Road 520
- Nevada State Route 520 (former)
- County Route 520 (New Jersey)
- Ohio State Route 520
- Pennsylvania Route 520
- Puerto Rico Highway 520
- South Carolina Highway 520 (former)
- Farm to Market Road 520
- Texas State Highway Loop 520
- Virginia State Route 520 (former)
- Washington State Route 520

Preceded by 519	Lists of highways 520	Succeeded by 521
