= Encarnación, Peñuelas, Puerto Rico =

Barrio of Puerto Rico

Encarnación
- Barrio
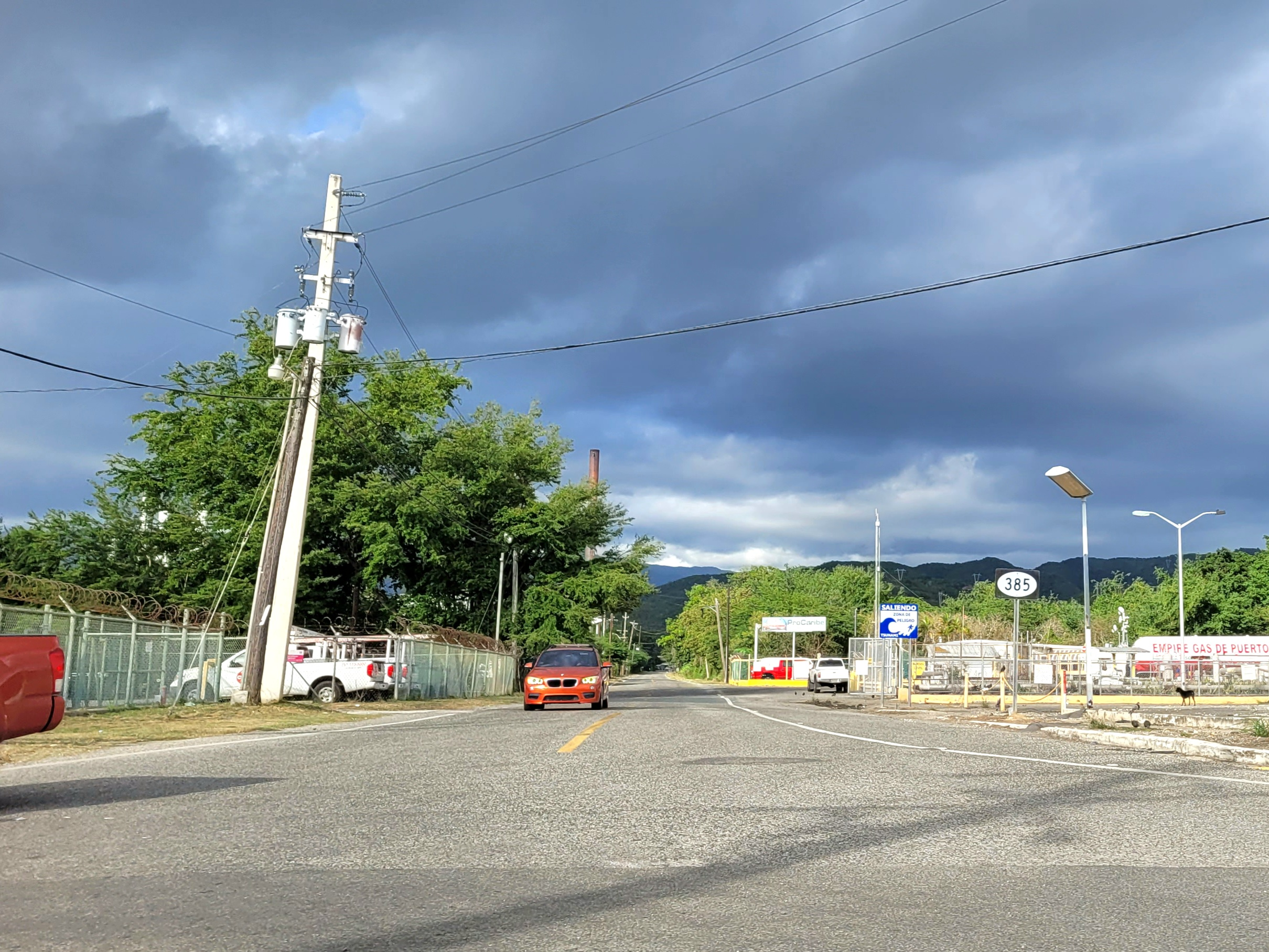
- Puerto Rico Highway 385 between Encarnación and Tallaboa Poniente

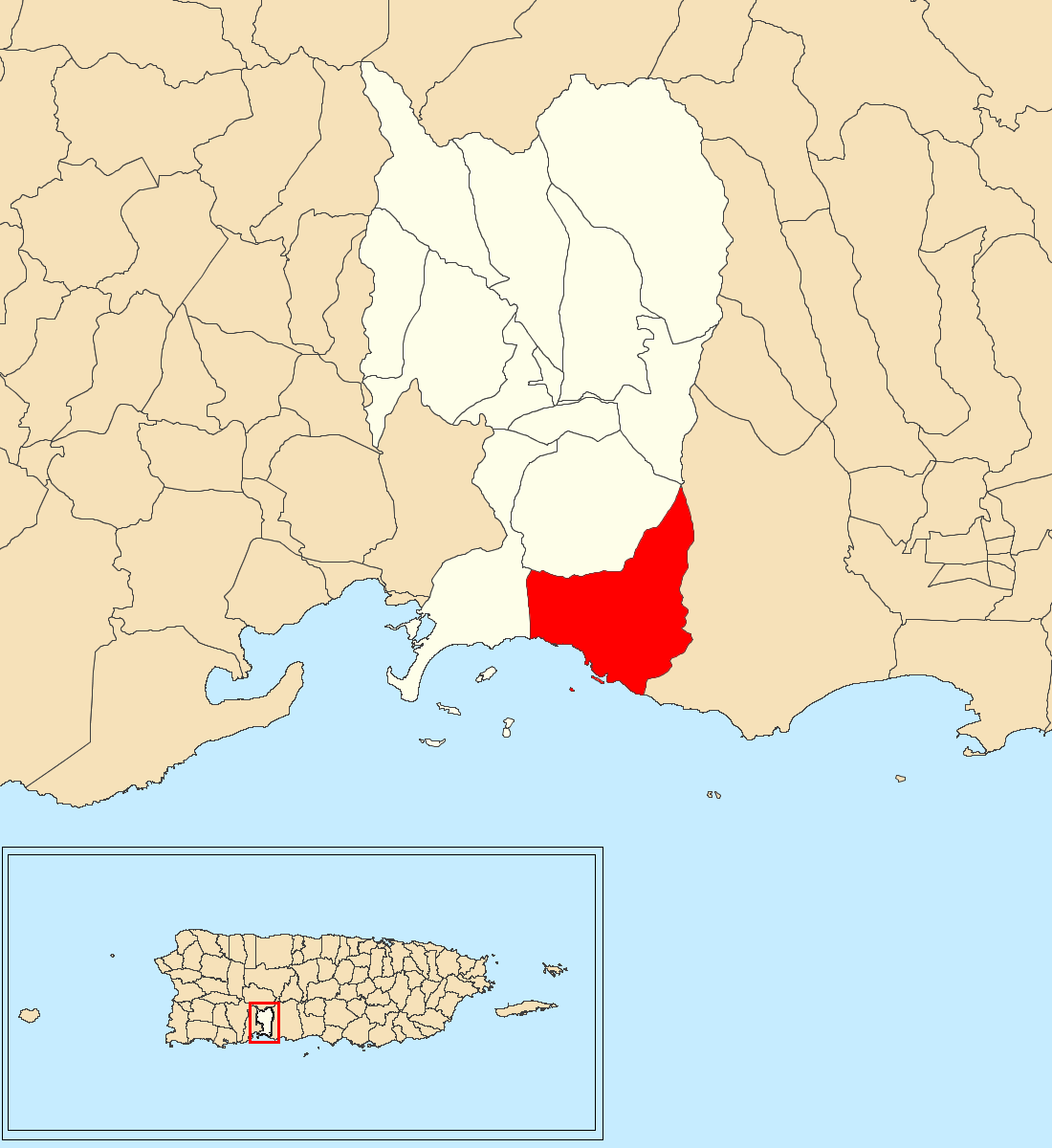
- Location of Encarnación within the municipality of Peñuelas shown in red

- Location of Puerto Rico
- Coordinates: 17°59′29″N 66°42′17″W
- Commonwealth: Puerto Rico
- Municipality: Peñuelas

Area
  - Total: 8.19 sq mi (21.2 km^{2})
  - Land: 4.90 sq mi (12.7 km^{2})
  - Water: 3.29 sq mi (8.5 km^{2})
- Elevation: 157 ft (48 m)

Population (2010)
  - Total: 1,378
  - Density: 281.2/sq mi (108.6/km^{2})
- Source: 2010 Census
- Time zone: UTC−4 (AST)

Encarnación is a barrio in the municipality of Peñuelas, Puerto Rico. Its population in 2010 was 1,378.

== History ==
Encarnación was in Spain's gazetteers until Puerto Rico was ceded by Spain in the aftermath of the Spanish–American War under the terms of the Treaty of Paris of 1898 and became an unincorporated territory of the United States. In 1899, the United States Department of War conducted a census of Puerto Rico finding that the combined population of Encarnación and Coto barrios was 1,271.

Historical population
Census	Pop.	Note	%±
1910	509		—
1920	396		−22.2%
1930	277		−30.1%
1940	407		46.9%
1950	459		12.8%
1960	1,327		189.1%
1970	1,429		7.7%
1980	1,838		28.6%
1990	1,156		−37.1%
2000	1,344		16.3%
2010	1,378		2.5%
U.S. Decennial Census; 1900 (N/A) 1910-1930; 1930-1950 1980-2000 2010

== Tallaboa ==
Tallaboa is a community in Encarnación and in 2010 had a total population of 925 inhabitants living in a land area of 0.51 square miles (1.3 km^{2}).

== See also ==
- List of communities in Puerto Rico
