= Peñuelas, Puerto Rico =

Town and municipality in Puerto Rico

Peñuelas Municipio Autónomo de Peñuelas
- Town and Municipality
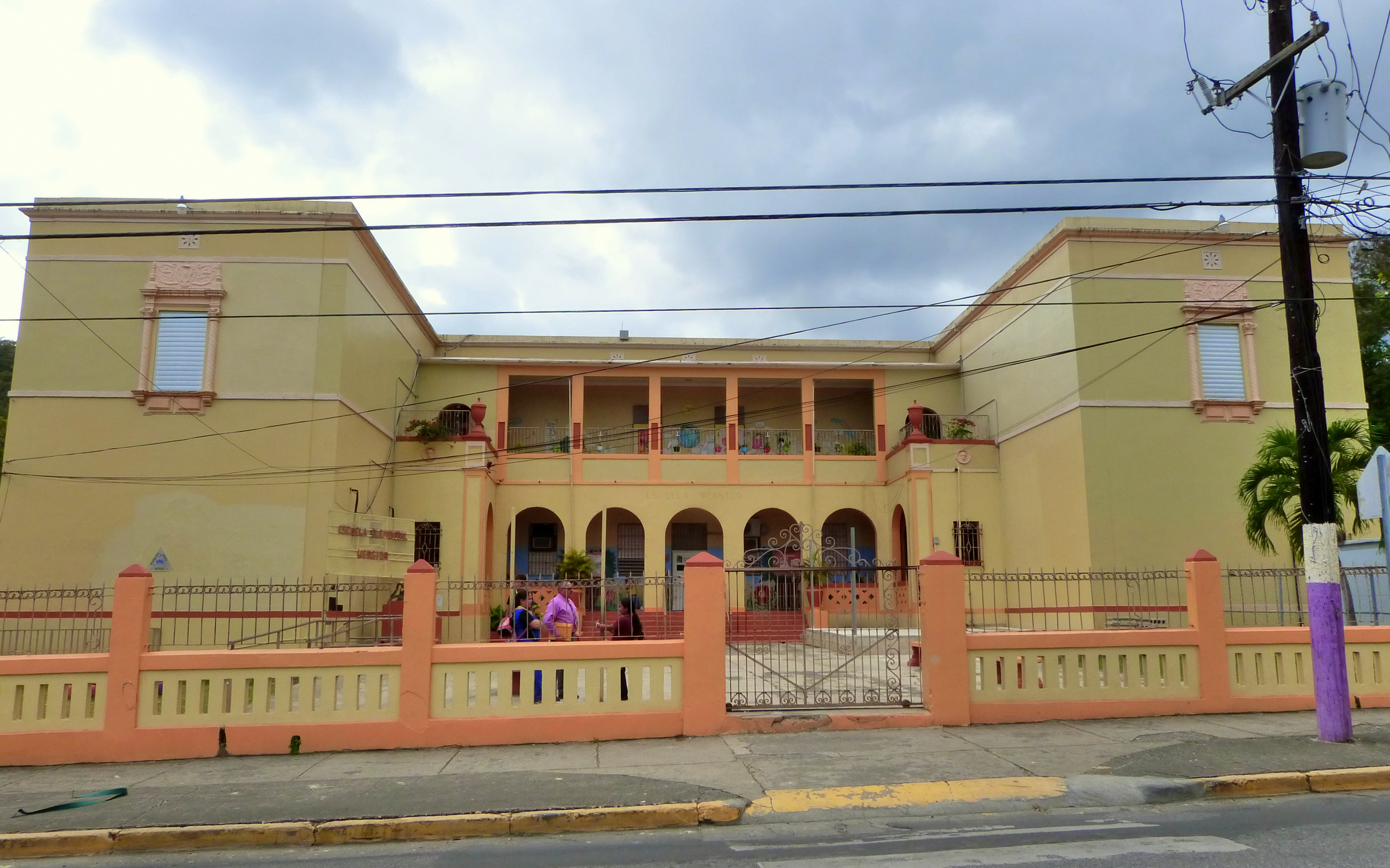
- Daniel Webster School in Peñuelas

- Flag Coat of arms
- Nicknames: "La Capital del Güiro" ("The Güiro Capital"), "El Valle de los Flamboyanes" ("The Valley of the Poinciana Trees")
- Anthem: "Así es mi pueblo"
- Map of Puerto Rico highlighting Peñuelas Municipality
- Coordinates: 18°3′34″N 66°43′21″W
- Sovereign state: United States
- Commonwealth: Puerto Rico
- Settled: 1754
- Founded: August 15, 1793
- Founder: Diego de Alvarado
- Barrios: 13 barrios: Barreal; Coto; Cuebas; Encarnación; Jaguas; Macaná; Peñuelas barrio-pueblo; Quebrada Ceiba; Rucio; Santo Domingo; Tallaboa Alta; Tallaboa Poniente; Tallaboa Saliente

Government
  - Mayor: Sr. Gregory Gonzalez Souchet (PPD)
  - Senatorial dist.: 5 - Ponce

Area
  - Total: 53.06 sq mi (137.42 km^{2})
  - Land: 44 sq mi (114 km^{2})
  - Water: 9.04 sq mi (23.42 km^{2})

Population (2020)
  - Total: 20,399
  - Estimate (2025): 19,325 ▼
  - Rank: 59th in Puerto Rico
  - Density: 463/sq mi (179/km^{2})
  - Ethnic groups (2000 Census): 83.3% European; 4.5% African; 0.3% Arawak; 0.1% Asian; 0.1% Native Hawaiian/PI; 9.4% Some other ethnicity 2.4% Two or more ethnicities
- Demonym: Peñolanos
- Time zone: UTC−4 (AST)
- ZIP Code: 00624
- Area code: 787/939
- Website: www.municipiodepenuelas.com

Peñuelas (Spanish pronunciation: [peˈɲwelas], locally [peˈɲwelaʔ]) is a town and municipality in Puerto Rico located in the Peñuelas Valley on the southern coast of the island, south of Adjuntas, east of Guayanilla, west of Ponce and north of the Caribbean Sea. Peñuelas is spread over 12 barrios and Peñuelas Pueblo (the downtown area and the administrative center of the city). It is part of the Yauco Metropolitan Statistical Area. Peñuelas is known as "La Capital del Güiro" (The Güiro Capital) and "El Valle de los Flamboyanes" (The Valley of the Royal Poinciana trees). In 2020, Peñuelas had a population of 20,399.

== History ==
In 1754, a group of workers had settled over the Bay of Tallaboa. Later gradually retreated deeper into the valley, heading to the most fertile land which would then be part of the town of Peñuelas. For the year 1788, approximately 80 families inhabiting the valley, which focused mainly on agriculture and livestock. Peñuelas Township was founded August 25, 1793 by Diego de Alvarado.

By 1874, the town had been developed and had a population of 9,206, according to a census of that year. The town had four main roads, some streets, a brick church and the town hall, which also served as a prison, barracks and a cemetery.

On March 1, 1902 the Legislative Assembly of Puerto Rico approved a law to consolidate certain municipal districts, so Peñuelas neighborhoods were attached to the municipality of Ponce. In 1905, the same Assembly repealed the law and Peñuelas became once again a municipality.

The first incident of the Puerto Rican Nationalist Party Revolt of 1950 occurred during the early hours of October 29, 1950 in Peñuelas when the insular police of that town surrounded the house of the mother of Melitón Muñiz Santos, the president of the Peñuelas chapter of the Nationalist Party in the barrio Macaná, under the pretext that he was storing weapons for the Nationalist Revolt. Without warning, the police fired upon the Nationalists in the house and a firefight between both factions ensued, which resulted in the death of two Nationalists and the wounding of six police officers. Nationalists Melitón Muñiz Santos, Roberto Jaume Rodríguez, Estanislao Lugo Santiago, Marcelino Turell, William Gutiérrez and Marcelino Berríos were arrested and accused of participating in an ambush against the local insular police.

On September 20, 2017 Hurricane Maria struck the island of Puerto Rico. In Peñuelas, an estimated 1,500 homes were completely destroyed and 500 were partially destroyed. With its winds and rainfall, the hurricane triggered numerous landslides in northern Peñuelas.

== Geography ==
Peñuelas is located on the southern coast, slightly west of the center. The highest point in the municipality of Peñuelas is an unnamed southern slope of Monte Guilarte that rises to 3,445 feet (1,050 m) of elevation, located at the municipal boundary with Adjuntas and Guayanilla. Other notable mountains in Peñuelas include Cerro Garrote (3,356 ft / 1,023 m), Cerrote de Peñuelas (3,307 ft / 1,008 m), Cerro El Peligro (2,890 ft / 880 m), and Cerro Mata de Plátano (2,673 ft / 815 m). Rivers of Peñuelas include the Guayanés, the Macaná and the Tallaboa Rivers.

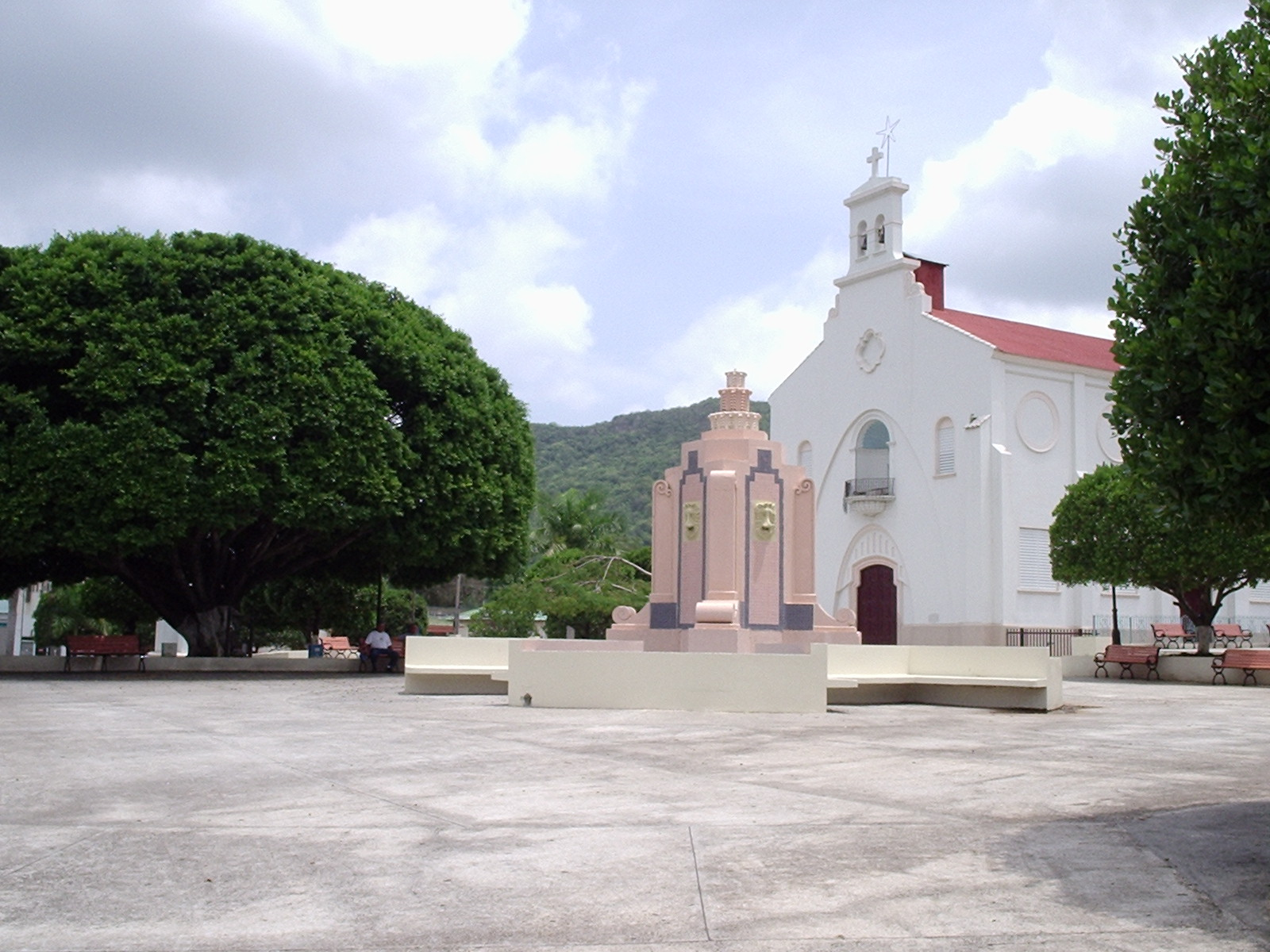
Peñuelas Roman Catholic Church

=== Barrios ===
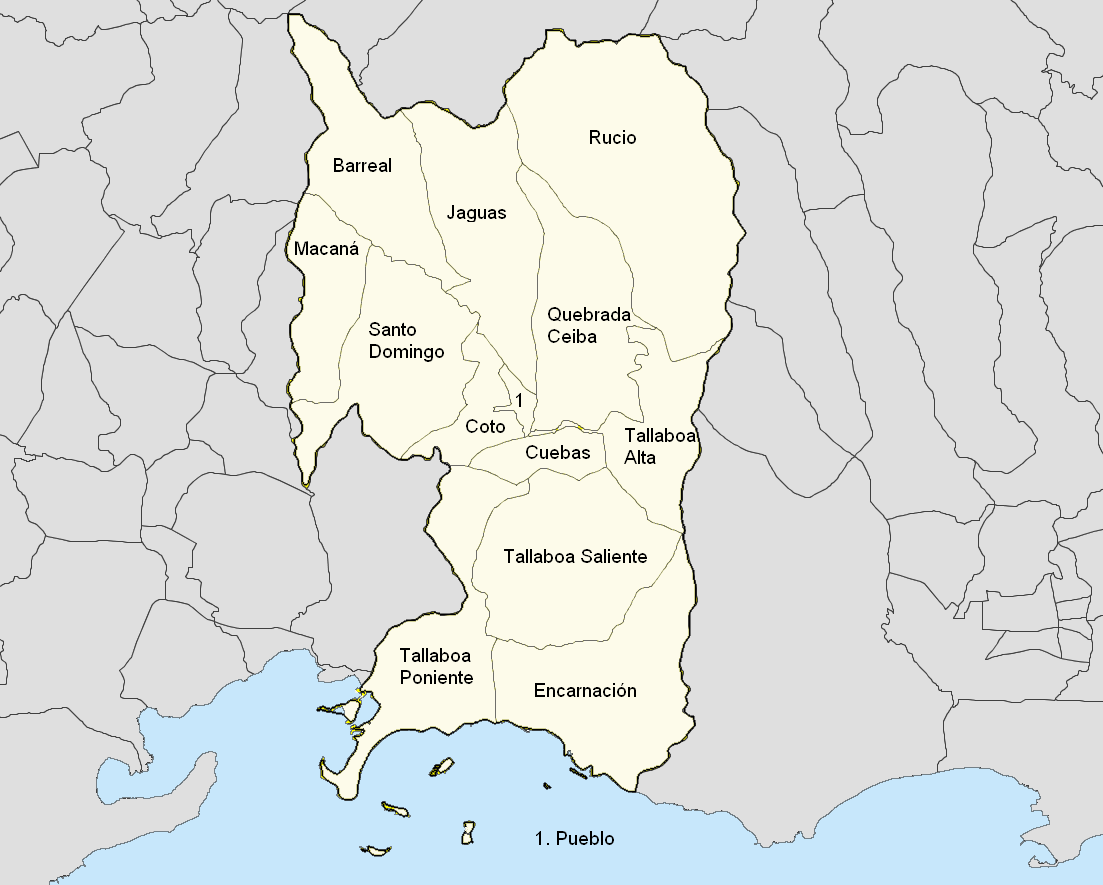
Subdivisions of Peñuelas.

Like all municipalities of Puerto Rico, Peñuelas is subdivided into barrios. The municipal buildings, central square and large Catholic church are located in a barrio referred to as "el pueblo".

1. Barreal
2. Coto
3. Cuebas
4. Encarnación
5. Jaguas
6. Macaná
7. Peñuelas barrio-pueblo
8. Quebrada Ceiba
9. Rucio
10. Santo Domingo
11. Tallaboa Alta
12. Tallaboa Poniente
13. Tallaboa Saliente

Within barrios are communities: For example, the Santo Domingo comunidad ('community') in Santo Domingo barrio and the Tallaboa community in the barrio of Encarnación.

=== Sectors ===
Barrios (which are, in contemporary times, roughly comparable to minor civil divisions) and subbarrios, are further subdivided into smaller areas called sectores (sectors in English). The types of sectores may vary, from normally sector to urbanización to reparto to barriada to residencial, among others.

=== Special Communities ===
Comunidades Especiales de Puerto Rico (Special Communities of Puerto Rico) are marginalized communities whose citizens are experiencing a certain amount of social exclusion. A map shows these communities occur in nearly every municipality of the commonwealth. Of the 742 places that were on the list in 2014, the following barrios, communities, sectors, or neighborhoods were in Peñuelas: Maldonado neighborhood (Los Chinos), Santo Domingo barrio, Comunidad Caracoles, and Comunidad La Moca in Tallaboa Alta.

== Demographics ==
Puerto Rico was ceded by Spain in the aftermath of the Spanish–American War under the terms of the Treaty of Paris of 1898 and became a territory of the United States. In 1899, the United States Department of War conducted a census of Puerto Rico finding that the population of Peñuelas was 12,129.

Historical population
Census	Pop.	Note	%±
1900	12,129		—
1910	11,991		−1.1%
1920	13,598		13.4%
1930	13,278		−2.4%
1940	14,789		11.4%
1950	14,931		1.0%
1960	14,887		−0.3%
1970	15,973		7.3%
1980	19,116		19.7%
1990	22,515		17.8%
2000	26,719		18.7%
2010	24,282		−9.1%
2020	20,399		−16.0%
2025 (est.)	19,325	▼	−5.3%
U.S. Decennial Census; 1899 (shown as 1900) 1910-1930; 1930-1950 1960-2000 2010 2020

== Tourism ==
=== Landmarks and places of interest ===
There are 15 beaches in Peñuelas. The main attractions in Peñuelas are:

- Charco La Soplaera (a natural water pool)
- El Convento Cave
- Don Angel Pacheco Monument
- Guilarte Forest
- Unknown Soldier's Monument
- Parque de Bombas (the old firehouse)
- La Negra Cocola is an 0-4-2T Baldwin Steam Locomotive on display in the main town square
- Peñuelas Museum of Art and History

== Economy ==
=== Industry ===
Manufacturing, refinery.

== Government ==
All municipalities in Puerto Rico are administered by a mayor, elected every four years. The current mayor of Peñuelas is Josean González Febres, of the New Progressive Party (PNP). He was first elected at the 2024 general elections.

The city belongs to the Puerto Rico Senatorial district V, which is represented by two Senators. In 2024, Marially González Huertas and Jamie Barlucea, from the Popular Democratic Party and New Progressive Party, respectively, were elected as District Senators.

== Symbols ==
The municipio has an official flag and coat of arms.

=== Flag ===
It has a rectangular bottom in canary yellow and stands for the sun, symbol of the physical life. In the center it has a purple or violet cross: symbol of Christianity and its ecclesiastical order; it represents the spiritual life. The cross purple extends to all the points of the yellow rectangle.

=== Coat of arms ===
The adornment above the shield, a stone wall, represents the perpetuity. The cross represents Santo Cristo de la Salud that "stopped the sea from flooding Peñuelas". The purple arm represents the priesthood and the town of Peñuelas. The canary yellow represents the sun. The blue and white symbolize the choppy sea and the regal ensign represents the faith in Christianity, "In God We Trust".

== Culture ==
=== Festivals and events ===
Peñuelas celebrates its patron saint festival in late October / early November. The Fiestas Patronales de San Jose is a religious and cultural celebration that generally features parades, games, artisans, amusement rides, regional food, and live entertainment.

Other festivals and events celebrated in Peñuelas include:

- Endless Fun Festival – April
- Festival of the Cross – May
- National Güiro Festival – May
- Festival of the Flamboyan Tree – Summer
- Children's Festival – August
- Folk Festival – October
- The Cantatas – December

== Sports ==
Peñuelas AA Amateur Baseball team is called Los Petroleros de Peñuelas (The Peñuelas' Oilers.) The origin of this name dates back to the days when Peñuelas was home to a major petro-chemical complex known as CORCO. Although CORCO closed operations in 1980, the name stuck throughout the years.

Also known as Luis "Tite" Arroyo's hometown, a baseball hero. Another hometown hero is Ivelisse Echevarria, who was inducted into the International Federation Softball Hall of Fame in 2003 and is considered by many to be the greatest softball pitcher born in Puerto Rico. Myrian "Betty" Segarra, who was inducted into the International Federation Softball Hall of Fame in 2003 and the best first base in the woman softball in Puerto Rico.

== Transportation ==
Peñuelas' public bus service ("la guagua") connects passengers to Ponce city (east) and Guayanilla (west).

There are 24 bridges in Peñuelas.

== Education ==
6 Elementary schools, 4 Intermediate Schools, 1 High School

== See also ==
- List of Puerto Ricans
- History of Puerto Rico
- Did you know-Puerto Rico?
