= Rucio =

Barrio of Peñuelas, Puerto Rico

- Barrio
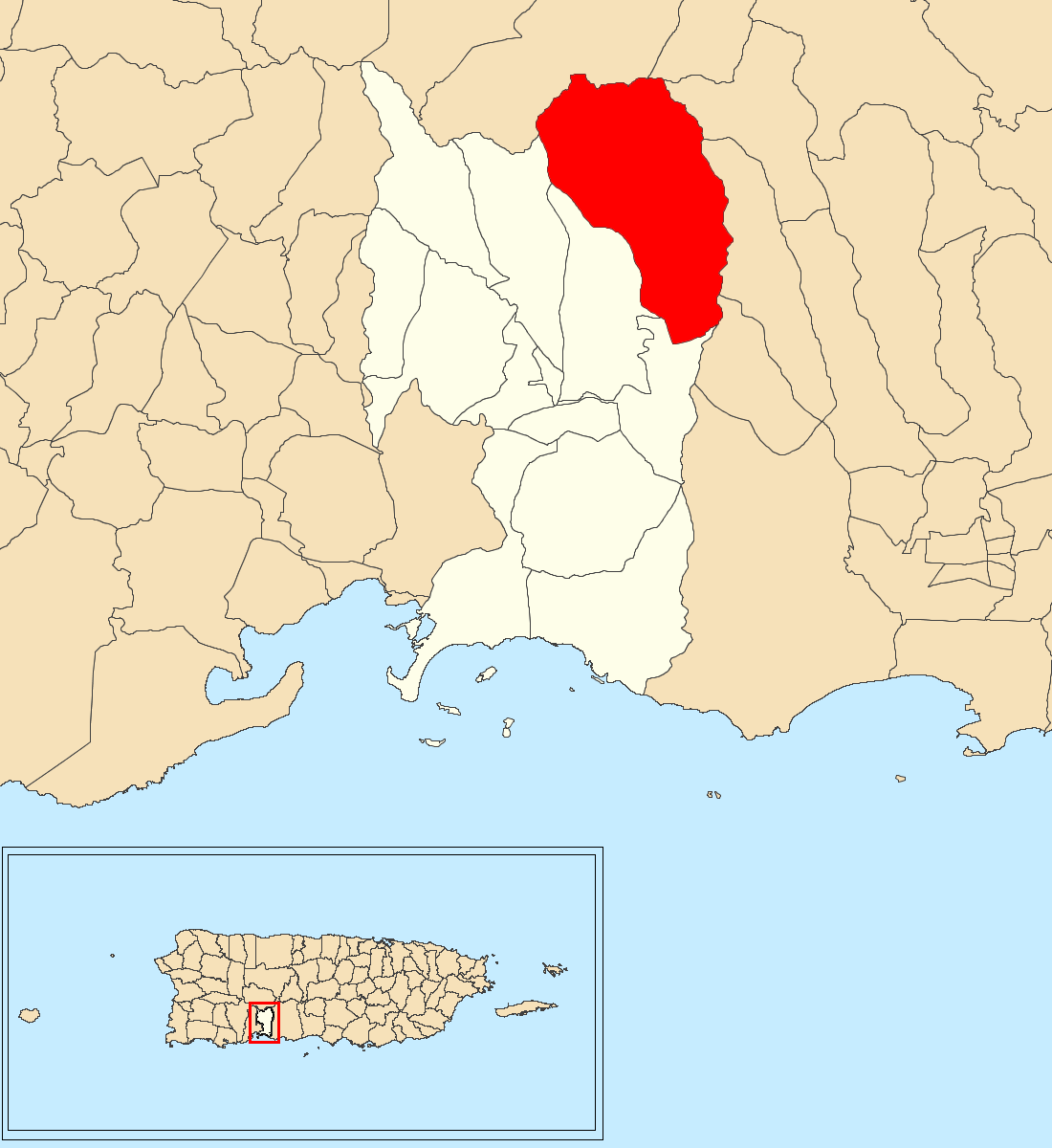
- Location of Rucio within the municipality of Peñuelas shown in red

- Location of Puerto Rico
- Coordinates: 18°06′07″N 66°41′46″W
- Commonwealth: Puerto Rico
- Municipality: Peñuelas

Area
  - Total: 8.49 sq mi (22.0 km^{2})
  - Land: 8.49 sq mi (22.0 km^{2})
  - Water: 0 sq mi (0 km^{2})
- Elevation: 1,611 ft (491 m)

Population (2010)
  - Total: 1,064
  - Density: 125.3/sq mi (48.4/km^{2})
- Source: 2010 Census
- Time zone: UTC−4 (AST)

Rucio is a barrio in the municipality of Peñuelas, Puerto Rico. Its population in 2010 was 1,064.

== History ==
Rucio was in Spain's gazetteers until Puerto Rico was ceded by Spain in the aftermath of the Spanish–American War under the terms of the Treaty of Paris of 1898 and became an unincorporated territory of the United States. In 1899, the United States Department of War conducted a census of Puerto Rico finding that the population of Rucio barrio was 2,233.

Historical population
Census	Pop.	Note	%±
1900	2,233		—
1910	1,958		−12.3%
1920	2,012		2.8%
1930	1,814		−9.8%
1940	1,688		−6.9%
1950	1,472		−12.8%
1960	1,261		−14.3%
1970	1,023		−18.9%
1980	995		−2.7%
1990	906		−8.9%
2000	1,124		24.1%
2010	1,064		−5.3%
U.S. Decennial Census; 1899 (shown as 1900) 1910-1930; 1930-1950 1980-2000 2010

== See also ==
- List of communities in Puerto Rico
