= Jaguas, Peñuelas, Puerto Rico =

Barrio of Puerto Rico

Jaguas
- Barrio
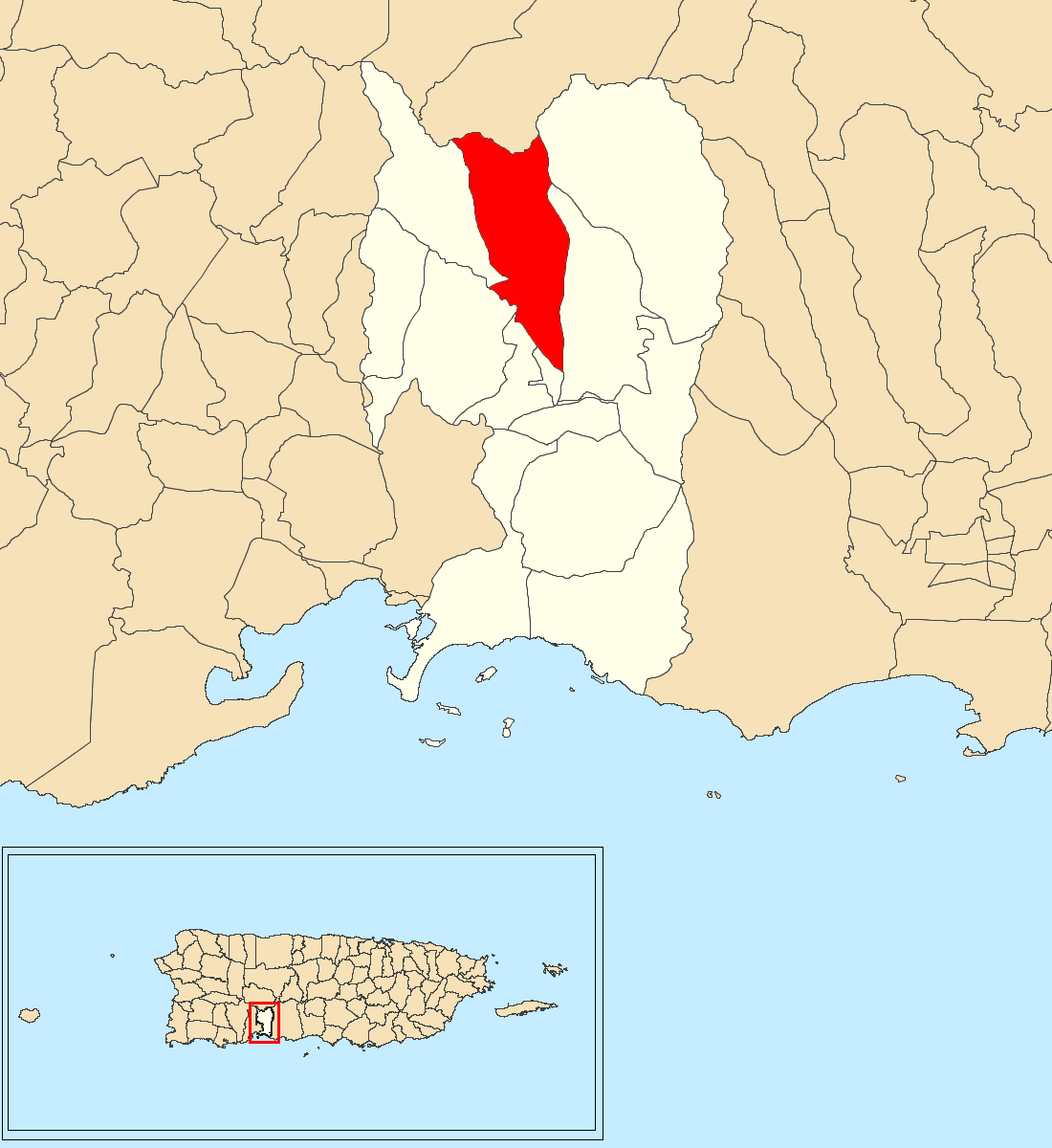
- Location of Jaguas within the municipality of Peñuelas shown in red

- Location of Puerto Rico
- Coordinates: 18°05′23″N 66°43′35″W
- Commonwealth: Puerto Rico
- Municipality: Peñuelas

Area
  - Total: 4.04 sq mi (10.5 km^{2})
  - Land: 4.03 sq mi (10.4 km^{2})
  - Water: 0.01 sq mi (0.026 km^{2})
- Elevation: 1,745 ft (532 m)

Population (2010)
  - Total: 2,211
  - Density: 548.6/sq mi (211.8/km^{2})
- Source: 2010 Census
- Time zone: UTC−4 (AST)

Jaguas is a barrio in the municipality of Peñuelas, Puerto Rico. Its population in 2010 was 2,211.

== History ==
Jaguas was in Spain's gazetteers until Puerto Rico was ceded by Spain in the aftermath of the Spanish–American War under the terms of the Treaty of Paris of 1898 and became an unincorporated territory of the United States. In 1899, the United States Department of War conducted a census of Puerto Rico finding that the population of Jaguas barrio was 971.

Historical population
Census	Pop.	Note	%±
1900	971		—
1910	1,015		4.5%
1920	1,205		18.7%
1930	1,240		2.9%
1940	1,665		34.3%
1950	1,562		−6.2%
1960	1,577		1.0%
1970	1,397		−11.4%
1980	1,752		25.4%
1990	1,872		6.8%
2000	2,662		42.2%
2010	2,211		−16.9%
U.S. Decennial Census; 1899 (shown as 1900) 1910-1930; 1930-1950 1980-2000 2010

== See also ==
- List of communities in Puerto Rico
