= Tallaboa River =

River of Puerto Rico

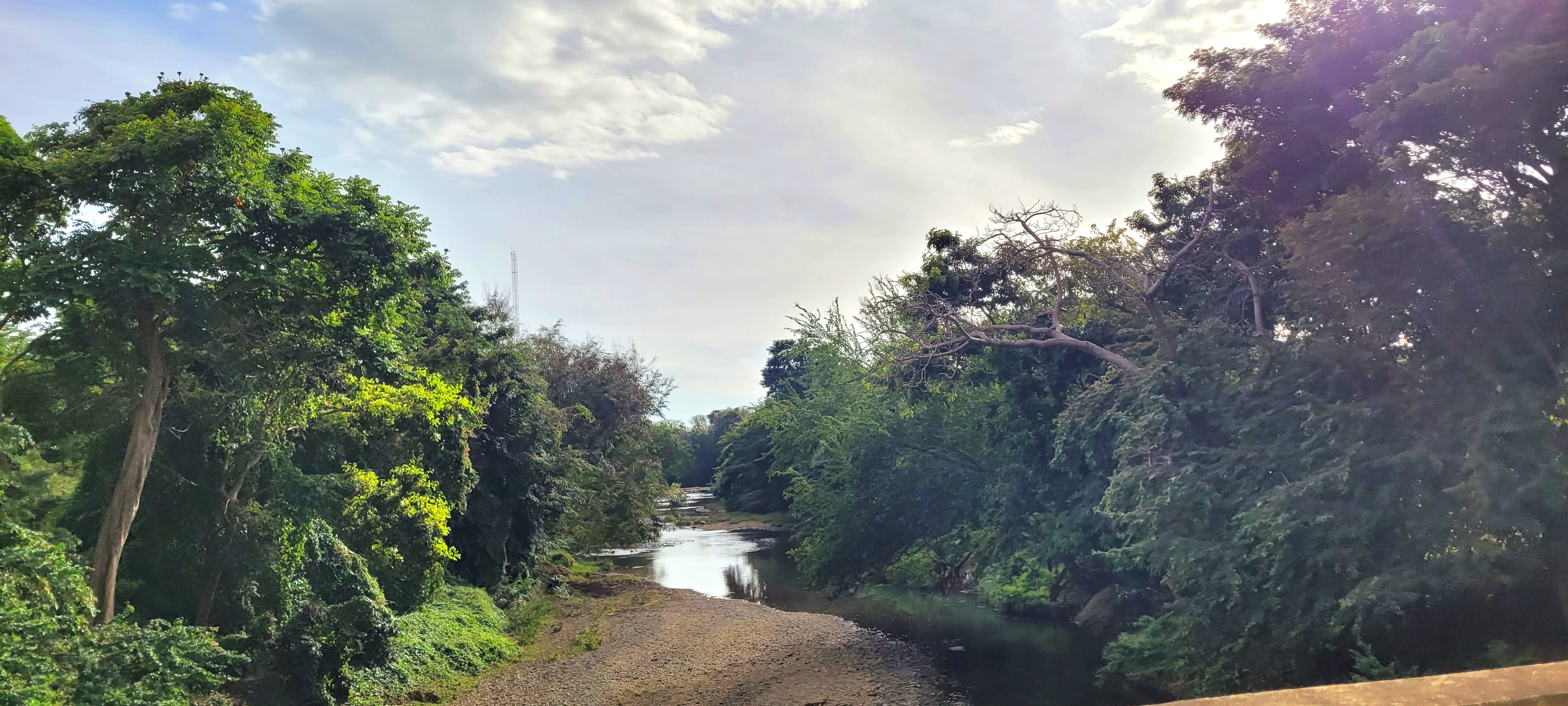
- Tallaboa River from Puerto Rico Highway 127
- Native name: Río Tallaboa (Spanish)

Location
- Commonwealth: Puerto Rico
- Municipality: Peñuelas

Physical characteristics
- Source
  - coordinates: 17.9902440°N 66.7360080°W

The Tallaboa River (Spanish: Río Tallaboa; pron. ta-ya-BO-ah), is a river in Peñuelas, Puerto Rico.

== See also ==
- List of rivers of Puerto Rico
