= Barreal =

Barrio of Peñuelas, Puerto Rico

- Barrio
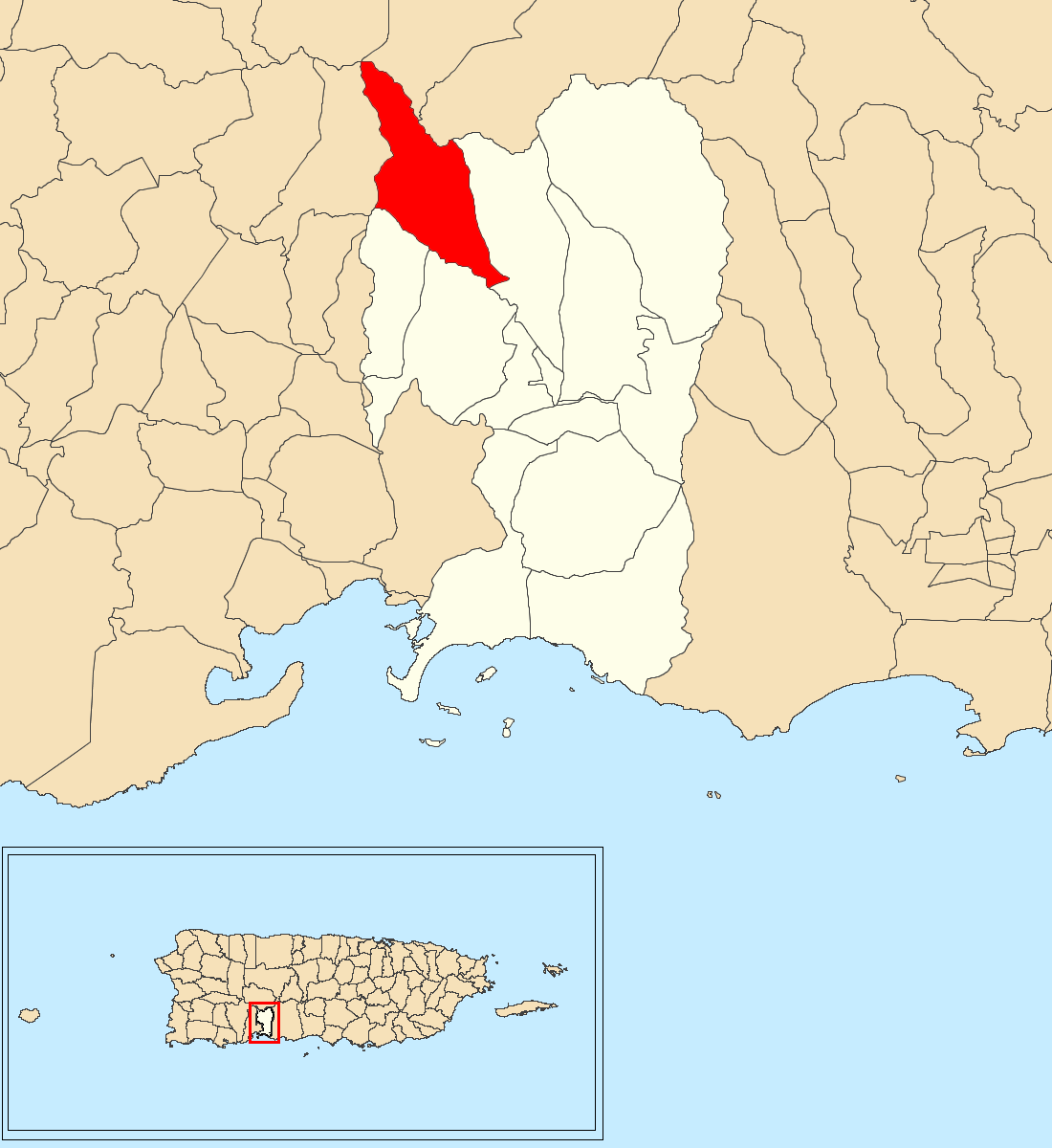
- Location of Barreal within the municipality of Peñuelas shown in red

- Location of Puerto Rico
- Coordinates: 18°06′18″N 66°45′11″W
- Commonwealth: Puerto Rico
- Municipality: Peñuelas

Area
  - Total: 3.56 sq mi (9.2 km^{2})
  - Land: 3.56 sq mi (9.2 km^{2})
  - Water: 0 sq mi (0 km^{2})
- Elevation: 3,094 ft (943 m)

Population (2010)
  - Total: 272
  - Density: 76.4/sq mi (29.5/km^{2})
- Source: 2010 Census
- Time zone: UTC−4 (AST)

Barreal is a barrio in the municipality of Peñuelas, Puerto Rico. Its population in 2010 was 272.

== History ==
Barreal was in Spain's gazetteers until Puerto Rico was ceded by Spain in the aftermath of the Spanish–American War under the terms of the Treaty of Paris of 1898 and became an unincorporated territory of the United States. In 1899, the United States Department of War conducted a census of Puerto Rico finding that the population of Barreal barrio was 922.

Historical population
Census	Pop.	Note	%±
1900	922		—
1910	766		−16.9%
1920	919		20.0%
1930	754		−18.0%
1940	961		27.5%
1950	723		−24.8%
1960	781		8.0%
1970	534		−31.6%
1980	423		−20.8%
1990	366		−13.5%
2000	267		−27.0%
2010	272		1.9%
U.S. Decennial Census; 1899 (shown as 1900) 1910-1930; 1930-1950 1980-2000 2010

== See also ==
- List of communities in Puerto Rico
