= Hacienda Buena Vista =

Museum and historic coffee plantation in Ponce, Puerto Rico

- U.S. National Register of Historic Places
- U.S. Historic district
- Puerto Rico Historic Sites and Zones
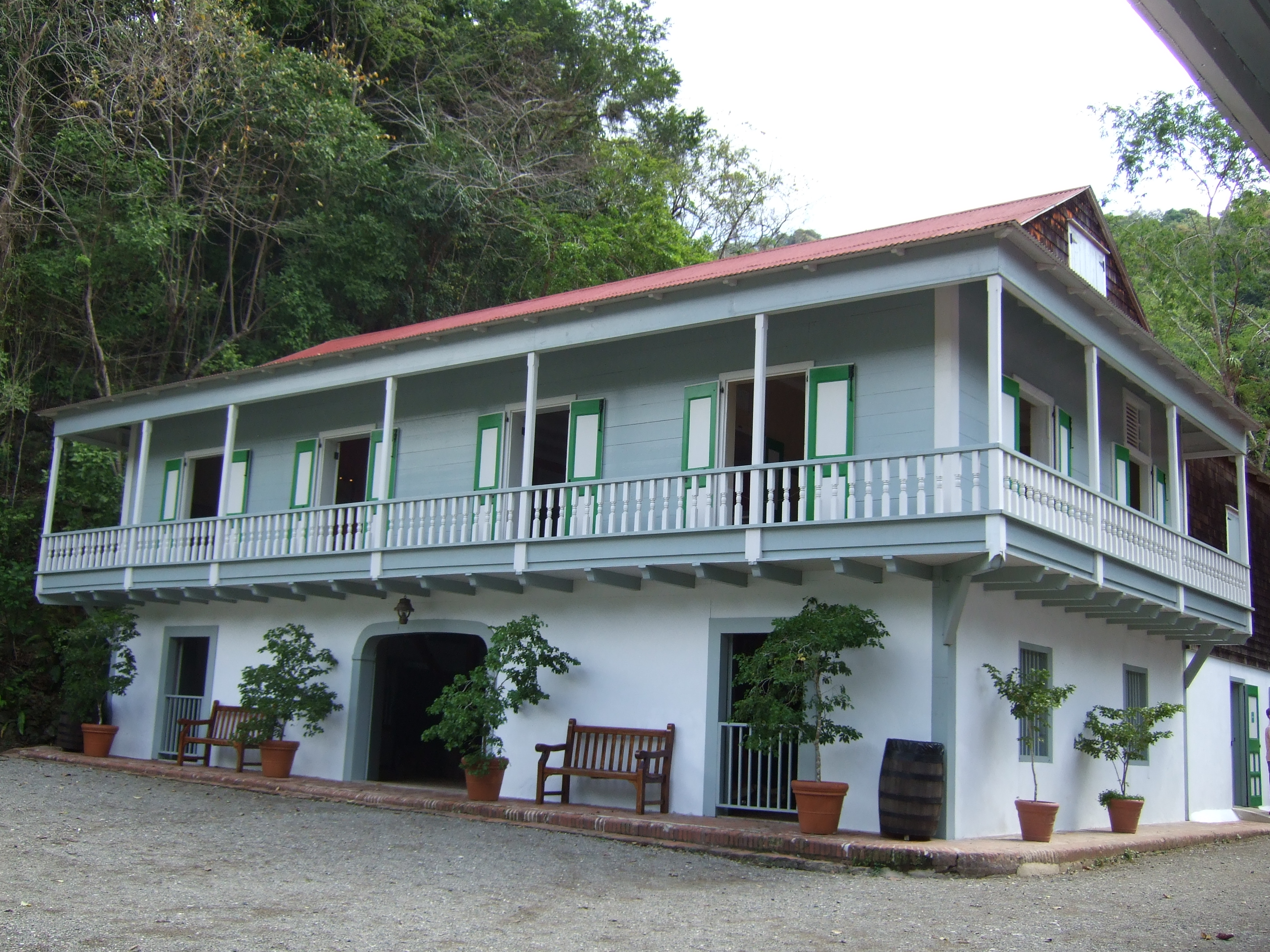
- The Manor House at Hacienda Buena Vista
- Location: Barrio Magueyes, PR-123, Km 16.8
- Nearest city: Ponce, Puerto Rico
- Area: 482 cuerdas (approx. 468 acres)
- Built: 1833
- Architectural style: Spanish Colonial and Ponce Creole
- NRHP reference No.: 91001499
- RNSZH No.: 2001-(RS)-23-JP-SH

Significant dates
- Added to NRHP: 17 October 1994
- Designated RNSZH: May 16, 2001

Hacienda Buena Vista, also known as Hacienda Vives (or Buena Vista Plantation in English), was a coffee plantation located in Barrio Magueyes, Ponce, Puerto Rico. The original plantation dates from the 19th century. The plantation was started by Don Salvador de Vives in 1833.

The Hacienda is located on 81.79 acres (331,000 m^{2}) of fertile land that includes a humid subtropical forest some 7 miles (11 km) north of Ponce on Route PR-123, in Corral Viejo, a subbarrio of Barrio Magueyes. The plantation house was built in the Spanish Colonial style, with the surrounding buildings being built in the local Criollo style. The original Hacienda covered 482 cuerdas (approx. 468 acres).

It is now owned by the Fideicomiso de Conservación de Puerto Rico (Puerto Rico Conservation Trust), which operates it as a museum which it opened in 1986.

== Significance ==
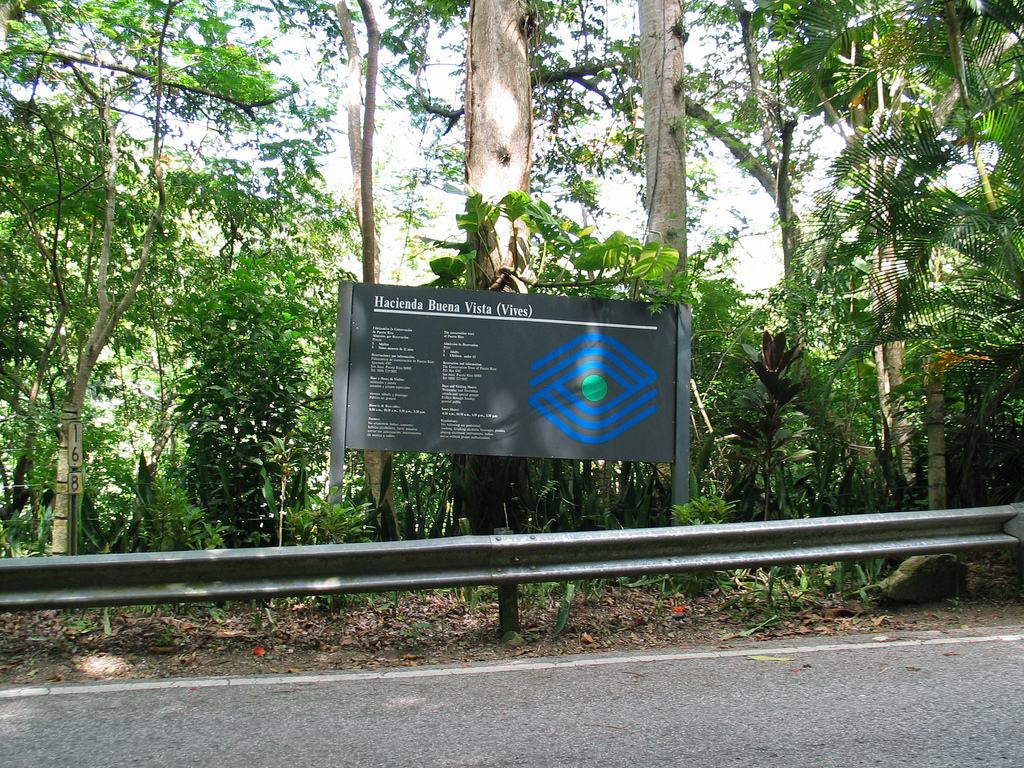
Entrance sign at Hacienda Buena Vista on Puerto Rico Highway 123 (PR-123) in Barrio Magueyes, Ponce, Puerto Rico

The Hacienda is significant for various reasons. First, it contains the only remaining example of the Barker hydraulic turbine, which was the first reaction type turbine ever made. It was nominated as a Mechanical Engineering landmark by the American Society of Mechanical Engineers in July 1994.

The second reason Hacienda Buena Vista is significant is that it offers one of the best remaining examples of a Puerto Rican coffee plantation. This is important because in the latter part of the nineteenth century the coffee produced in Puerto Rico and exported to Europe and the United States was considered among the finest in the world. It is said to have even been the favorite at the Vatican at the time. Hacienda Buena Vista is also significant because it shows the evolution of the coffee industry in the region. Various periods can be appreciated. These range from the cultivation of produce such as plantains (1833–1845); to the production of flour (from rice and corn) (1847–1872). These products were staples for the subsistence of the local population.

== Brief history ==
Hacienda Buena Vista was started as a truck farm to produce mostly plantains, bananas, corn and avocados, by Don Salvador de Vives in 1833. De Vives was a Catalan immigrant arriving from Venezuela and he set up the farm to sell its produce in the Ponce market and in the sugarcane estates along the southern coast. Originally, the Vives estate covered 500 acres (2.0 km^{2}).

In 1845, the son of Don Salvador added a corn mill operation to the profitable fruit and vegetable production. Later, Don Salvador's grandson oversaw the addition of coffee growing and processing to the plantains and cornmeal, taking advantage of the great coffee-growing boom of the 1880s and 1890s. Don Salvador's son and grandson introduced some of the most innovative farm machinery on the island, powered by a nearby 100-foot (30 m) waterfall. Eventually Hacienda Buena Vista would become one of the most successful plantations in the mountains of Puerto Rico.

A series of hurricanes and the failing coffee market brought operations at the Hacienda to a standstill by 1900, and gradually Hacienda Buena Vista fell into disrepair and was partially abandoned.

By 1937 agriculture had seriously declined in Puerto Rico, and the plantation was abandoned, becoming mostly a weekend country house for the Vives heirs. Worker barracks, outbuildings and equipment deteriorated rapidly under the humid tropical climate and rainfall.

In 1984, the Puerto Rico Conservation Trust bought 86 of the original 500 acres (2.0 km^{2}), with the intention of restoring it. Despite the grave deterioration of the coffee-processing machinery and the farm buildings, the Conservation Trust managed to restore the estate so that it could be used to educate the public about the golden era of fine coffee growing in the mountains of Puerto Rico. The original owners donated many of the furnishings, and the Conservation Trust purchased other authentic pieces.

Hacienda Buena Vista is today a well-known educational destination. The machinery of the original Hacienda has been put in motion again, farm animals roam the grounds, the farmhouse rooms have been furnished, and the scent of freshly roasted coffee fills the surrounding air. Visitors can take tours through the old Vives country home and explore the plantation buildings and grounds. Authentic 19th-century farm machinery is exhibited that shows how a coffee plantation worked in the 1880s.

== Salvador Vives ==
=== Migration from Venezuela ===
Salvador Vives arrived in Puerto Rico from Venezuela fleeing the struggle for independence going on in that country at the beginning of the nineteenth century. At the time he was a 12-year Spanish career officer from the province of Catalonia in Spain, who had been stationed in Caracas, until he was forced to leave after the defeat of the Spanish Army in the battle of Carabobo in 1821. It was thus that Vives traveled from Venezuela to Puerto Rico on 27 June 1821 with his wife Isabel Diaz and son Carlos. Accompanying him were also two slaves. He settled in the southern port city of Ponce, where the sugar industry was booming.

=== Early Puerto Rico years ===
With no capital to buy sugarcane-growing land, Salvador Vives worked for the municipal government of Ponce during the 1820s and 1830s in assisting other displaced Spanish emigrants and also as a public notary. By 1838 he had enough money to purchase 482 acres (1.95 km^{2}) of hilly, undeveloped, tropical forest land in barrio Magueyes, to the north of the city of Ponce, and near the Canas River.

The land consisted mostly mountainous terrain with thick forest, and far from the town. Fortunately, Vives was able to purchase the lands relatively cheap for the lands in greatest demand at that time were the rich flatlands near the coast that provided the perfect conditions for the sugar-growing industry. The development of a new road in that area, PR-123, would also guarantee that products from Vives' future farm could be bought down for sale to the marketplace in Ponce with relative easy. The construction of the farm-to-market PR-123 road would prove to be a factor in the success of Vives' hacienda.

== Vives’ Hacienda ==
Plan of Hacienda Buena Vista as it existed in the 19th century.

=== As a fruits and vegetables hacienda ===
Hacienda Buena Vista grew plantains, beans, yams, and corn which were bought at Plaza del Mercado Isabel II in Ponce by the area sugar plantation owners to feed the slave labor force of their plantations. The hacienda also grew other crops, including cotton, coffee, and rice and it also raised cattle, oxen, mules and horses in the limited lower pastures of the hacienda, in the vicinity of the hacienda's buildings complex. Initially, the hacienda's principal crop was plantain (Musa acuminata × balbisiana). By 1845 there were 40 acres (160,000 m^{2}) growing this crop. This acreage grew steadily from the mid-1820s to the early 1840s. Between 1852 and 1860 the production of plantains at the farm had increased from 329,200 to 475,380.

=== First mill is installed ===
In 1837 Vives purchased a corn mill, a coffee depulper, a cotton gin, and a rice husking machine, all animal-powered, to process its agricultural goods. During the 1840s the hacienda's economic activity had diversified into produce production and corn flour distribution throughout Puerto Rico's central coastal region. The purchase and installation of the corn mill proved to be a great investment for Vives. Not only did his financial earnings multiplied, but he was also able to gain enough prominence to be elected mayor of Ponce, between 1841 and 1845. He served three terms as mayor. During his terms as mayor, Vives had the District Court Center moved from Coamo to Ponce, he also had the City Hall built, and arranged for the official coat of arms of the city with the Spanish crown.

=== First water-powered corn mill ===
After Salvador Vives' death in 1845, his son Carlos took over the management of the hacienda. "Carlos perceived the production of corn meal to feed sugar plantation slaves would be of enough economic importance to finance the construction of a water-powered corn mill to replace the animal-powered corn mill built by his father. Built between 1845 and 1847, the new corn mill installed by Carlos Vives had a sixteen-foot-diameter wooden water wheel that moved the gears for the grinding stones of the corn mill. Carlos powered the new corn mill with water derived from the waterfall on the Canas River that traveled through a 2,600-foot-long (790 m) water canal, which was begun in 1847 and completed in 1851. Within the corn mill structure, Carlos also built a corn toasting room where corn was dried before it was milled. Carlos completed many of the hacienda structures and buildings that today are part of the complex, including the slave quarters, the manor house, the warehouse, and the carriage house with stables for horses and mules."

=== The turbine-driven corn mill ===
The building of the now-historic Barker engine also came under son Carlos Vives tenancy: "In 1847, with the demand for milled corn rising given the increase in sugar plantation slaves around Ponce, Carlos constructed another building for a new corn mill powered with a hydraulic turbine from the West Point Foundry, in Cold Spring, New York. The turbine was patented in the United States, in 1843, by James Whitelaw, of Scotland. The flour from Hacienda Buena Vista gained islandwide prominence due to its excellent quality. From 1847 to 1873, the corn flour of the hacienda reigned supreme over other local mills. Shortly afterwards, a corn mill to pulverize the corn was mounted, and the hacienda's white and yellow corn flour received the gold medal for excellence in the second public exposition celebrated in San Juan in June 1855." In 1860, the hacienda won awards again at the Puerto Rico Exposition Fair.

=== Rise and fall of coffee as a main product ===
Carlos Vives died in 1872. Around this time the sales volume of corn meal, one of the hacienda's primary products, began to decline. Instead of demand for corn meal, world demand for Puerto Rican coffee, was starting to become as significant an export crop as sugar for which Vives could not afford the price of the lands. Envisioning a future for coffee production, in 1892 Carlos's eldest son (also named Salvador Vives like his grandfather) installed coffee depulping and bean husking machine in the old corn mill and ran them both using the original mill wheel. "Production of corn meal and coffee provided a diversified economic basis for the continued success of the hacienda."

Some of the best Puerto Rican coffee was produced in the central mountain area of the island around Yauco, Ponce, Lares, Maricao, Utuado, and Cayey. The Vives’ family hacienda lands were also ideal for coffee production. Towards the end of the nineteenth century, Hacienda Buena Vista produced and processed over 5 tons of coffee a year, just for export to Europe. The good days of coffee production at Hacienda Buena Vista, however, came to an end during the dawn of the 20th century when a series of three yearly natural and politico-economic disasters took place, and coffee production in all of Puerto Rico fell from 338 tons to only 8 tons per year.

In 1899, hurricane San Ciriaco struck a hard blow to coffee production in Puerto Rico. After this hurricane, Puerto Rico would never become a coffee exporter again. To exacerbate this, in 1900 the worldwide price of coffee fell to levels that made it considerably more difficult to compete. The third blow came in 1901, when Puerto Rico was included into the United States Customs System, setting the local coffee production at a competitive disadvantage over its European markets. It also dropped Puerto Rico's favored status in US markets. To compensate, the Salvador Vives switched to a successful orange growing program for the New York City market. This new phase of agriculture continued until 1956.

== Description of the hacienda ==
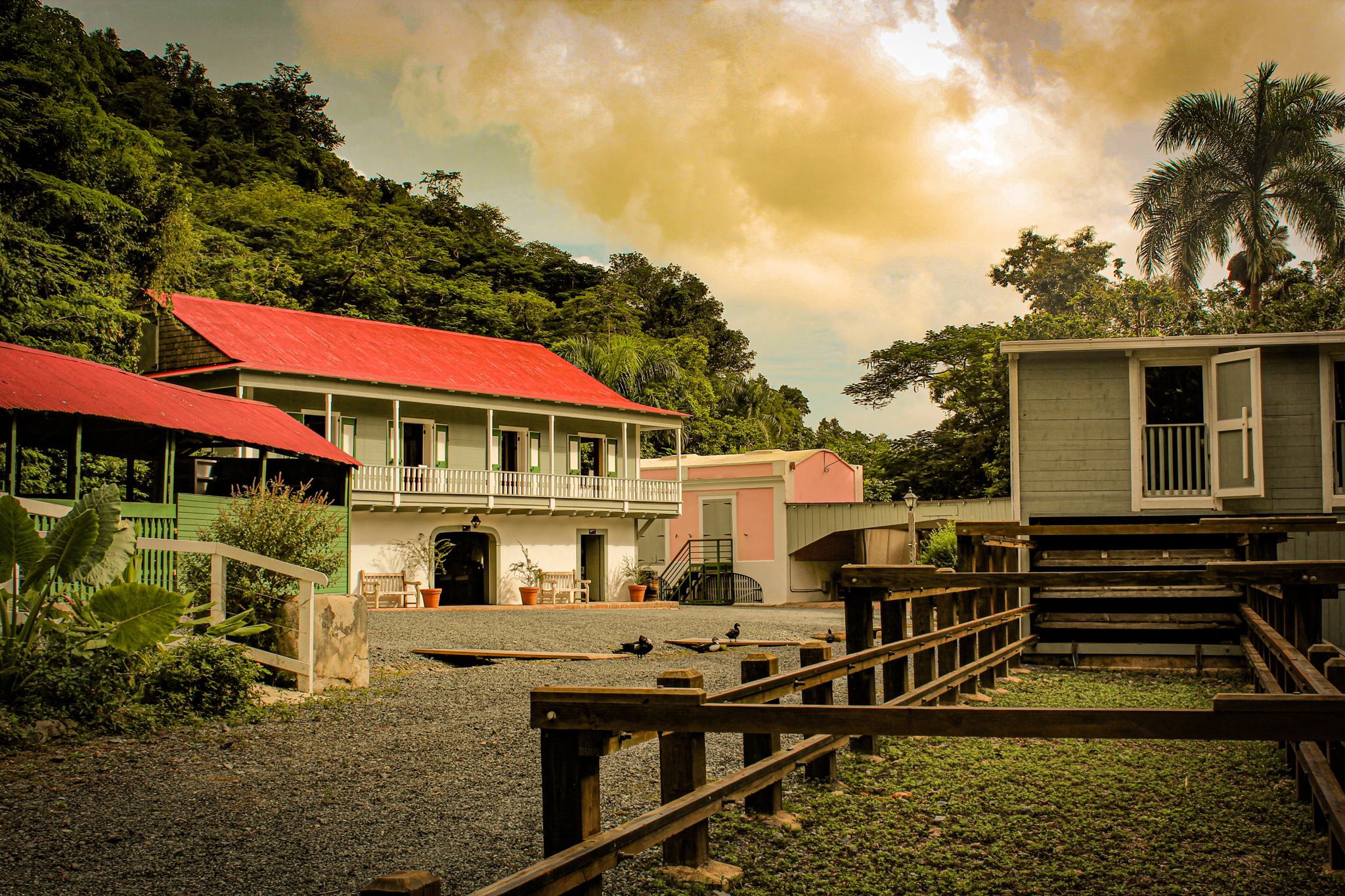
View of the main yard area.

Hacienda Buena Vista is located in Barrio Magueyes, in the municipality of Ponce, Puerto Rico at between 160 and 460 meters above sea level. The hills near the hacienda buildings are excellent for cultivating corn, coffee, and fruits. The nearby Canas River provides the power for the power needed to run the hacienda's mills.

The hacienda today is made up of an 87-acre (350,000 m^{2}) agricultural complex. Its main buildings are grouped together in a 3-acre (12,000 m^{2}) central area and the property includes 11 original buildings: the hacienda manor house, the carriage house, the horse stables, the mule stables, the caretaker's house and office, two warehouses, a hurricane shelter, the corn mill, and the slave quarters. There is a water canal system that is still operative, an aqueduct, and a house garden. The coffee bean processing building was rebuilt to look like the original 1892 building.

=== Manor House and related structures ===
The manor house is a 2-story 60x50ft building. It was built in 1845. The ground floor was designed to be used for storage. The second floor contains three bedrooms and a living room. The eastern half of the manor house is made of brick and includes a courtyard, the kitchen, two more bedrooms and a bathroom. The manor house also has garden surrounded by a wrought iron-and-brick fence. The garden served two purposes: "Historically, this garden served as the formal entrance to the hacienda complex; however, it was most often used as a private family place." Dependent on horses for managing the hacienda, its administrators also built a carriage house, stables, and a small caretaker's house. In addition mule stables and caretaker's office were also built. Located opposite the manor house, is the hurricane shelter. It is a solid brick structure measuring 15 ft (4.6 m). x 25 ft (7.6 m), and built 3 ft (0.91 m). above ground. Its walls, floor and ceiling were made to withstand or dissipate the destructive tropical storms that are common in this region.

=== Canal and aqueduct ===
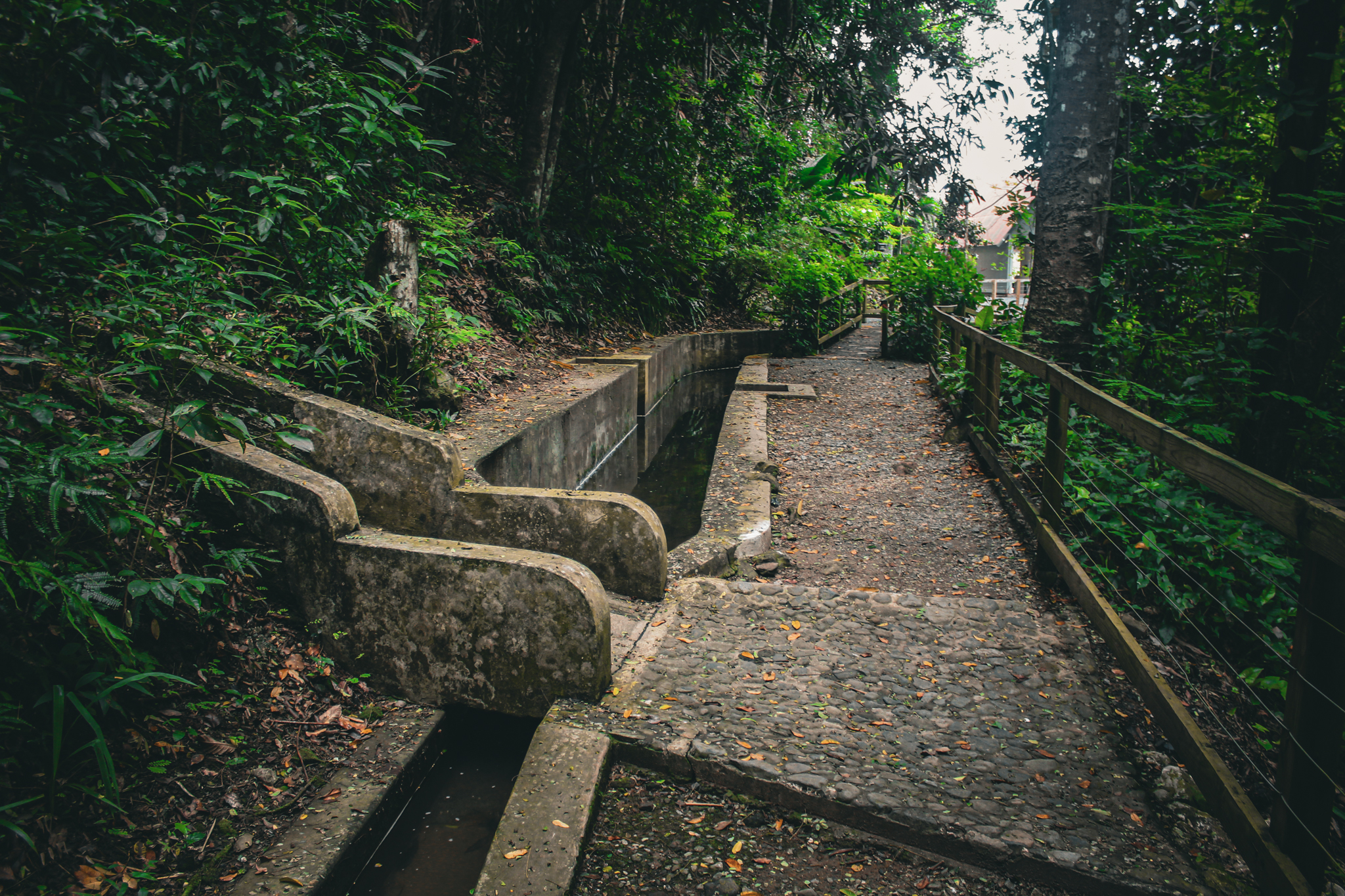
View of one of the water canals.

An important component of the plantation was the brick-and-mortar canal which is (18 in. deep by 12 in. wide) and runs some 2,600 feet (790 m). A water drop height of 360 meters provides the energy needed to run the mills in the hacienda. Vives paid 360 Spanish pesos for the 58 acres (230,000 m^{2}) that comprise the area of the Canas River to pride for his canal. The use of the River for the hacienda was authorized by the Spanish Colonial Government in Puerto Rico. The canal and aqueduct were finished in 1851. A series of manifolds are used for diverting the water according to the needs of the hacienda agricultural production: one gate diverts water to the water wheel and the corn mill water turbine, another gate diverts water to the fermentation tank, the ornamental washbasin, and the bath, and a third gate diverts water to a race which sends water back to the Canas River.

=== Coffee de-pulping and husking mill ===
The coffee de-pulping and husking mill is a 2-story wooden building located to the northwest of the Hacienda manor house. It originally housed the 1845 corn mill but in 1892, with the need for processing the coffee beans produced by Hacienda Buena Vista, the structure was modified to become the coffee husking mill.

=== Corn mill ===
A second corn mill at Hacienda Buena Vista was built in 1854. It is a two-story wood-frame structure measuring 16 ft (4.9 m). wide by 25 ft 4 in (7.72 m) long. The actual corn-milling work took place on the floor of this mill. Dried corn making it thru a hopper in this building was processed here. Grinding of the corn into corn meal occurred here. It was also packer into bags here. One of the canals of the aqueduct system ran underneath this building to power the corn mill above. As required for the production of ground coffee, a bean drying station was also built. Thus building dates from 1847. The building had previously served as slave quarters, but after the abolition of slavery in Puerto Rico in 1873, it was converted into a bean drying building. The pans used for drying the coffee beans were kept in this building as well.

==== The historic turbine ====
"The hydraulic turbine for the corn mill was ordered by a Mr. Bennet, in August 1853, as agent for Don Carlos Vives, from the West Point Foundry in Cold Spring, New York. The purchase was made through the Maitland and Phelps Company, also of New York. The turbine follows the design patented by James Whitelaw and James Stirrat, of Paisley, Renfew, Scotland, in 1841."

== Technology at the hacienda ==
Hacienda Buena Vista stood out from among the other haciendas in the region for the use of sophisticated machinery:

"The Scotch-type turbine on the pit's floor of the corn mill is a unique piece of hydraulic technology machinery, recognized by the American Society of Mechanical Engineers. Although the turbine is not a classic 17th-century Baker's centrifugal or reaction turbine wheel it might be a transformed one, since this "Buena Vista Turbine" does not fit within the Baker's description. Nevertheless, the wheels have an element in common since their arms are very similar in so far as it refers to shape, position, and function. On the other hand, it is not a Scotch turbine either, being this a modification of the Baker turbine. Apparently, the Buena Vista turbine builder used the Scotch turbine principles to make the one in situ, adapting at the same time parts of the Baker's design with added improvements of its own. It is significant that in the mid-1840s—while the hacienda was being developed—the Scotch turbine was being patented in the United States after European designs (particularly the La Cour's centrifugal wheel). R. L. Johnson assessed the "Buena Vista Turbine" in the following way:

Only the three Scotch turbines—first patented in the 1840s—are known to exist in the United States.... This acute shortage of extant early hydromachinery is the principal reason why the technological history of the water motor remains obscure and relatively poorly documented...Recently, however, the discovery of a unique turbine located on a plantation at Ponce, near the south coast of Puerto Rico, promised to open a new window on the past.... The turbine at Hacienda Buena Vista…is the only pre-Scotch type-known to exist and is the sole extant example of a pioneer and historically important machine that was invented at the close of the 17th century by Dr. Baker.... The Buena Vista turbine is, in effect, a missing link in the evolution of mechanical artifacts better known to the historians of technology. (The Journal of the Society for Industrial Archeology, Vol. 4, No. 1 [1978], pp. 55–58)."

== Legacy ==
On 16 July 1994, Robert B. Gaither of the American Society of Mechanical Engineers presented a plaque to the Puerto Rico Conservation Trust designating the Hacienda Buena Vista's hydraulic turbine as a National Historic Monument of Mechanical Engineering. The award was given in recognition not only of the value of the turbine but also of the extraordinary work the Conservation Trust carried in its restoration.

== Later and current use ==
In 1956, the government of Puerto Rico expropriated most of the lands of Buena Vista as a result of a new law to provide land to local farmers. Only 87 acres of land remained with the Vives, including the manor house and the water channel system. These 87 acres were acquired by the Fideicomiso de Conservación de Puerto Rico (Conservation Trust of Puerto Rico) in 1984. In 1986, the Trust restored the hacienda to much of its past glory and turned it into a museum. The museum opened in 1987. The museum is the only farm museum in Puerto Rico. In 1988, the Trust entirely rebuilt the coffee mill to its 1892 look.

=== Hacienda Buena Vista Protected Natural Area ===
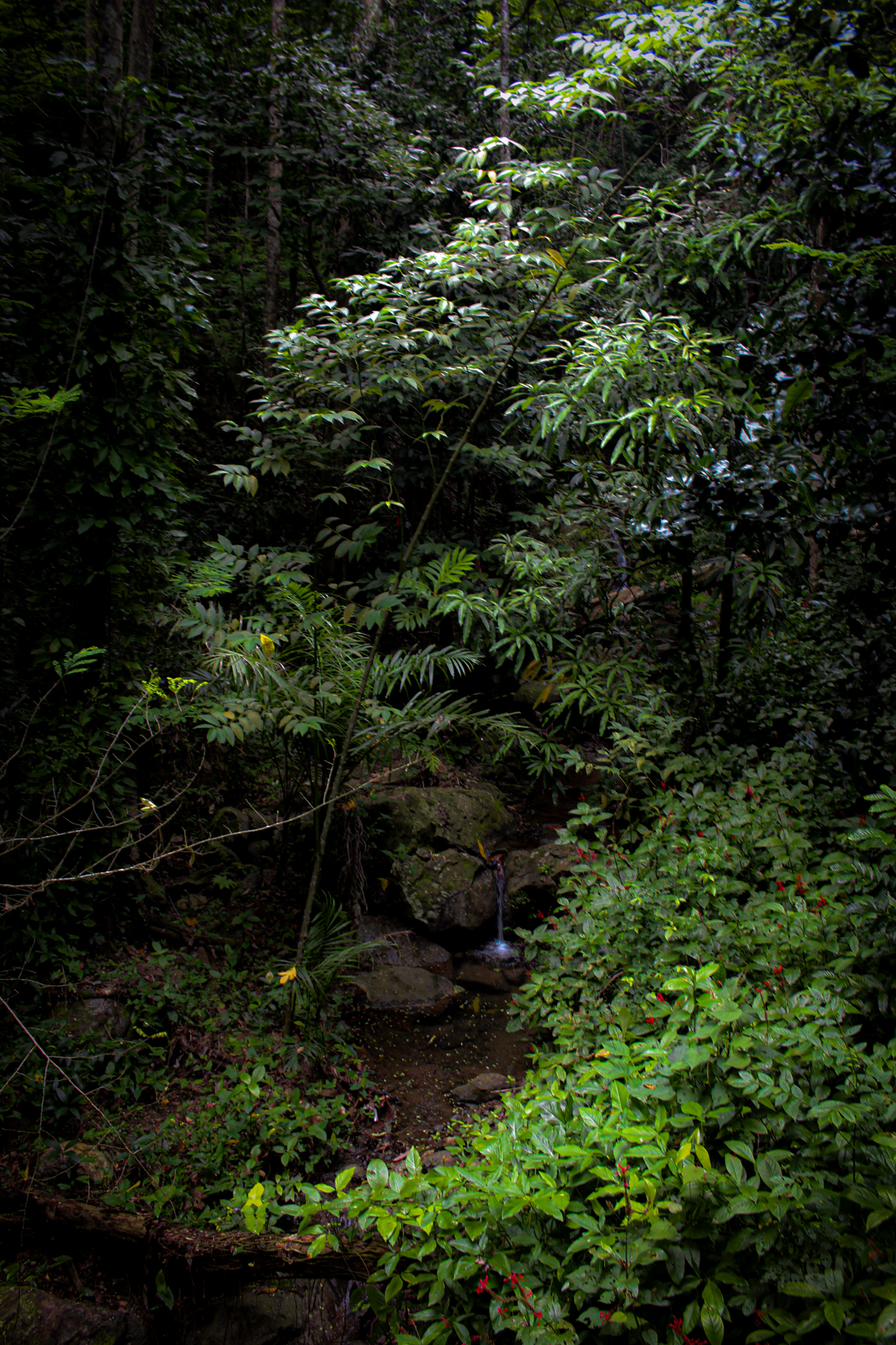
Small creek in the PNA flowing towards Cañas River

The natural environment around the Hacienda Buena Vista historic district is also protected as the Hacienda Buena Vista Protected Natural Area (Área Natural Protegida Hacienda Buena Vista) also managed by the Conservation Trust of Puerto Rico as part of Para la naturaleza. This protected natural area, spanning across the municipalities of Ponce and Adjuntas, is centered around the Cañas River (Río Cañas) which originates high in the Cordillera Central within the area of Guilarte State Forest, and flows down to the Caribbean coast at the confluence with the Pastillo River (Río Pastillo) to form the Matilde River (Río Matilde). This area protects the integrity of the river and its riparian ecosystem in both natural and historic agricultural contexts, having been important for the development of the hacienda itself. Portions of this natural area are often visited as part of guided tours to the hacienda.

== Bibliography ==
- Baralt, Guillermo A. 1988. Hacienda Buena Vista. Puerto Rico Conservation Trust (Fideicomiso de Conservación).
- Baralt, Guillermo A. 1989 Esclavos rebeldes: conspiraciones y sublevaciones de esclavos in Puerto Rico (1795–1873). Ediciones Huracán, Inc., Rio Piedras, Puerto Rico.
- Boyer, William W. 1983. America's Virgin Islands. A History of Human Rights and Wrongs. Carolina Academic Press. Durham, North Carolina.
- Buitrago, Carlos. 1892. Haciendas cafetaleras y clases terratenientes en el Puerto Rico decimononico. Editorial de la Universidad de Puerto Rico, Rio Piedras.
- Johnson, Robert L.; O'Reilly, Patricia (1978). "The Barker's Turbine at Hacienda Buena Vista". IA, The Journal of the Society for Industrial Archaeology. 4 (1): 55–58. JSTOR 40967957.
- Landers, Jane. 1990. "African Presence in Early Spanish Colonization." In Columbian Consequence. Volume 2. Archaeological and Historical Perspectives on the Spanish Borderlands East, pp. 315–327, edited by D.H. Thomas. Smithsonian Institution Press, Washington, D.C.
- Vidal Armstrong, Mariano. 1988. Ponce, Notas para su Historia. Oficina de Preservación Histórica. San Juan, Puerto Rico.
- Robert Sackett, Preservationist, PRSHPO (Original 1990 draft). Arleen Pabon, Certifying Official and State Historic Preservation Officer, State Historic Preservation Office, San Juan, Puerto Rico. 9 September 1994. In National Register of Historic Places Registration Form—Hacienda Buena Vista. United States Department of the Interior. National Park Service. (Washington, D.C.)
