= Cañas River (Ponce, Puerto Rico) =

River of Puerto Rico

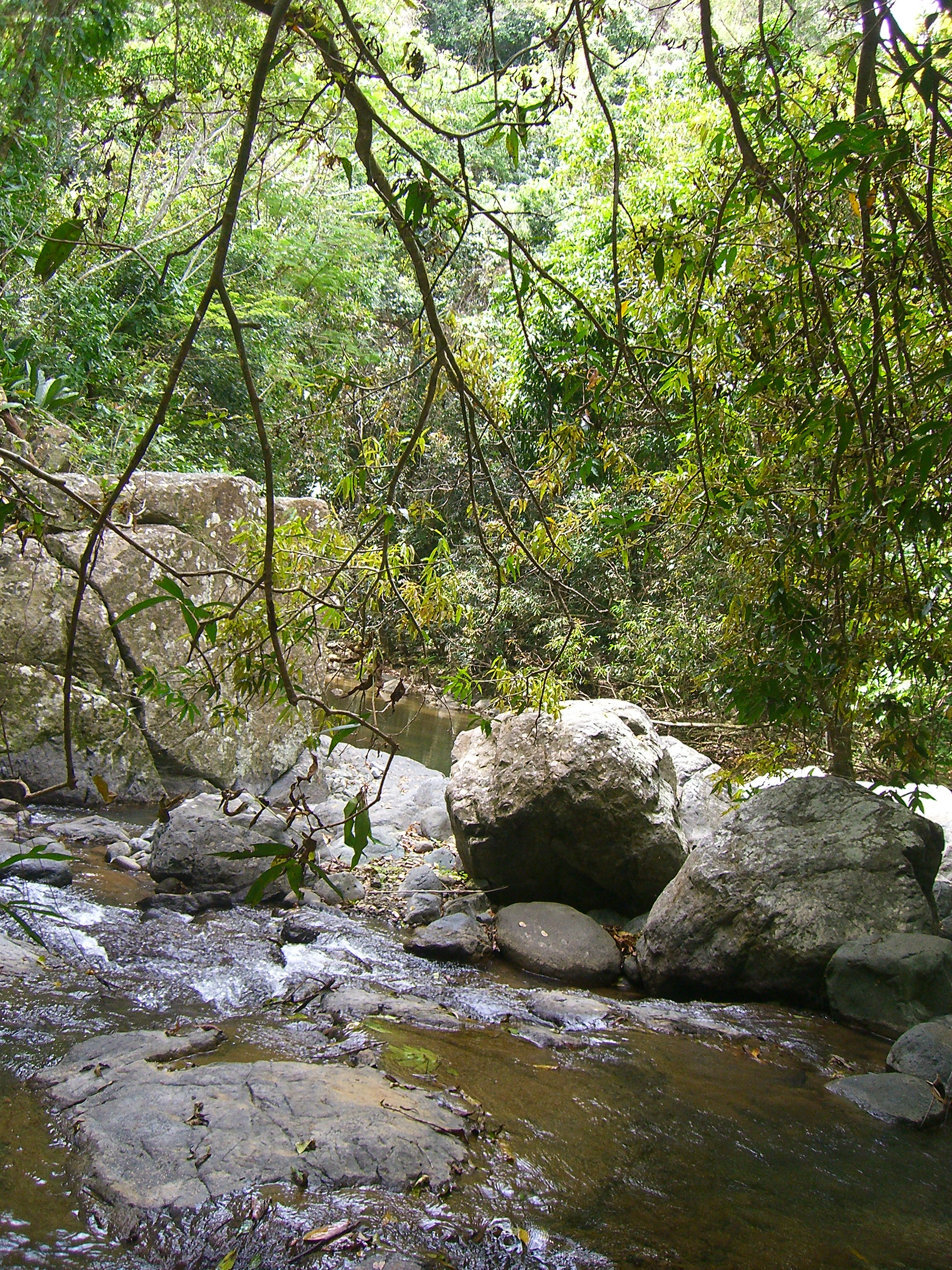
- Cañas River in Ponce, Puerto Rico, crossing through Hacienda Buena Vista

Location
- Commonwealth: Puerto Rico
- Municipality: Ponce

Physical characteristics
- Source
  - location: Cerro Avispa, Barrio Guaraguao
  - coordinates: 18.0019106°N 66.6404508°W
  - elevation: 930 feet (280 m)
- Mouth
  - location: Rio Matilde
  - elevation: 15 feet (4.6 m)
- Length: 14 km (8.7 mi)

Basin features
- Progression: Guaraguao; Magueyes; Magueyes Urbano; Canas Urbano
- River system: Río Matilde

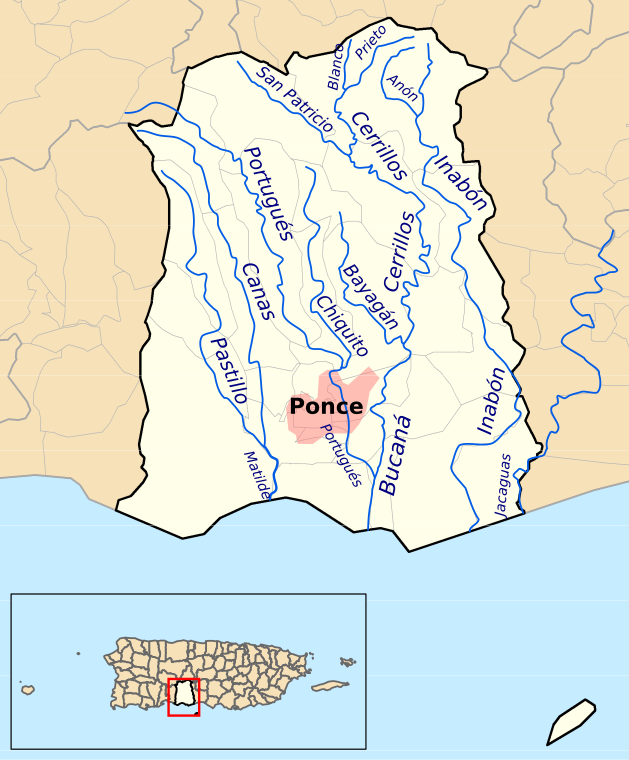
Map showing the location of Río Cañas among the other rivers in the municipality. The area in pink represents the urban zone of the city

Cañas River, also known as Río Cañas (English: Canas River), is a river in the municipality of Ponce, Puerto Rico. It is also known as Río Magueyes in the area where it flows through Barrio Magueyes, also in the municipality of Ponce. This river is one of the 14 rivers in the municipality.

== Origin ==
The river originates in Cerro Avispa, located in Barrio Guaraguao, near Guaraguao's boundary with the municipality of Adjuntas, and runs south towards the Caribbean Sea. The old Hacienda Buena Vista plantation in barrio Magueyes, now a coffee mill museum, used the force of Cañas River in the early 20th century to turn its coffee bean grinders via an elaborate system of water channels.

== Course ==
The river runs in a southerly direction parallel to Puerto Rico route PR-123, the old road from Adjuntas to Ponce. Continuing south and running parallel to Route 123, the river enters the city of Ponce in the area of barrio Magueyes Urbano (the urban zone of barrio Magueyes) before approaching PR-132, the country road from Ponce to Peñuelas. This area of PR-132 is known as Calle Villa Final, and the river crosses Calle Villa Final immediately east of the entrance to Urbanizacion Jardines del Caribe from Calle Villa Final. The river then runs parallel to Jardines del Caribe's East Main Street, and crosses Avenida Las Americas (PR-163), next to the intersection of PR-163 and PR-500. Continuing south, Río Cañas merges with Río Pastillo, as it approaches Calle Baramaya behind Urbanizacion Río Cañas, to become Río Matilde. Less than one mile further south Río Matilde empties into the Caribbean Sea at barrio Playa.

The Government of Puerto Rico plans to canalize this river.

The following table summarizes the course of Rio Canas in terms of roads crossed. Roads are listed as the river flows from its origin in Cerro Avispa, in Barrio Guaraguao, north of the city of Ponce, until the river feeds into Rio Matilde in Barrio Canas in the south (N/A = Data not available):

No.	Barrio	Road	Road's km marker	NBI ID	Bridge name (if any)	Direction (of bridge traffic)	Coordinates	Notes
1	Guaraguao	Camino Santas Pascuas (aka, PR-516)	not marked	N/A	Off PR-123, km 20.4*	Both	18°7′25.824″N 66°40′21.6114″W	0.4 km west of PR-123 on Camino Santas Pascuas (PR-516)
2	Guaraguao	PR-501R	0.3*	13971	Unnamed	Both	18°6′27.396″N 66°39′48.7074″W	8 km northeast of Peñuelas
3	Guaraguao	Camino Las Lomas	not marked	N/A	Off PR-123, km 20.0*	Both	18°5′57.5874″N 66°39′40.284″W	0.5 km north of Iglesia San Andres
4	Magueyes	Camino Pasaje Grillasca, Carr. Sto. Domingo	not marked	N/A	Off PR-123, km 16.3*	Both	18°4′48.144″N 66°39′13.8954″W	0.1 km north of Iglesia Bautista Corral Viejo; 0.5 km south of Hacienda Buena Vista (PR-123, km 16.8)
5	Magueyes	Finca El Huerto Peniel	not marked	N/A	Off PR-123, km 14.3	Both	18°4′19.056″N 66°39′5.652″W	
6	Magueyes	PR-501	0.0	4891	Unnamed	Both	18°2′18.096″N 66°38′43.6194″W	Entrance to Parcelas Magueyes; 2 km north of Ponce
7	Magueyes Urbano	Avenida Ponce de Leon	not marked	21281	Unnamed	Both	18°1′52.752″N 66°38′30.7314″W	0.1 km west of PR-123, at entrance to Urb. Las Delicias
8	Canas Urbano	PR-132	25.2	13731	Unnamed	Both	18°0′41.112″N 66°38′25.2234″W	Entrance to Jardines del Caribe
9	Canas Urbano	PR-500	0.5	23211	San Antonio	Both	18°0′29.1954″N 66°38′25.188″W	At Avenida Las Americas (2 km west of Ponce)

*Marker requires field verification.

== Surrounding geology ==
The southern end of Río Cañas is known to be surrounded by significant amounts of limestone. This area made the ideal place for the location of a cement factory, and Ponce Cement was built near Río Cañas.

== Fish life ==
In 2008, a study was made to determine fish life in Rio Cañas. The study found that at 5.6 km NNW of Ponce the river runs at an elevation of 220.8m; at 5.0 km NNW of Ponce it runs at an elevation of 164.2m; at 3.1 km NW of Ponce it runs at an elevation of 57.7m; and at 2.0 km NW of Ponce it runs at an elevation of 30.0m.

== See also ==
- List of rivers of Puerto Rico
- List of rivers of Ponce
