= Río Matilde =

River of Puerto Rico

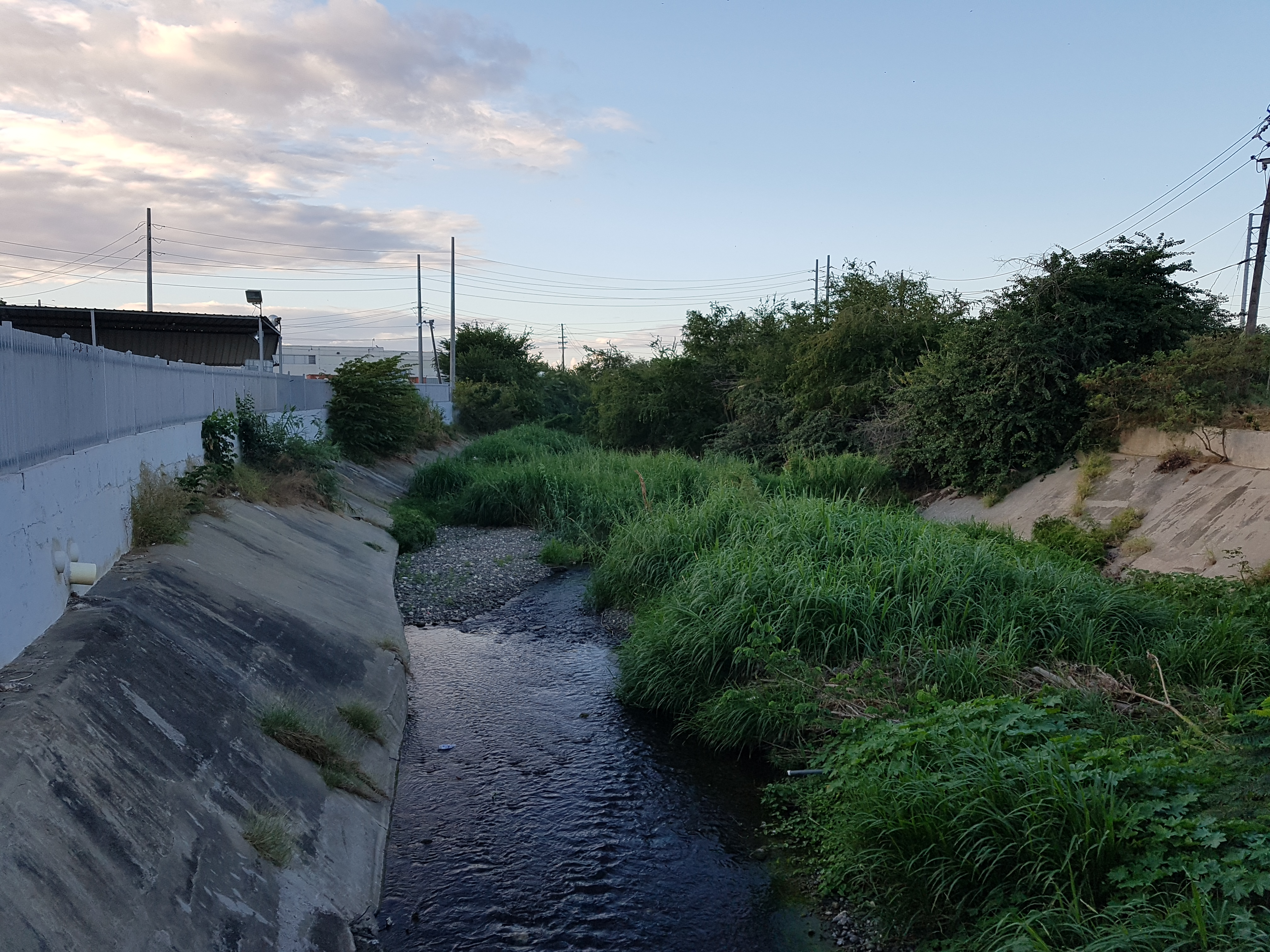
- Rio Matilde, looking south from PR-2, Barrio Canas, Ponce, PR

Location
- Commonwealth: Puerto Rico
- Municipality: Ponce

Physical characteristics
- Source
  - location: Convergence of Rio Pastillo and Rio Canas, Barrio Canas, Ponce, Puerto Rico
  - coordinates: 18.1319046°N 66.5798949°W
  - elevation: 15 feet (4.6 m)
- Mouth
  - location: Caribbean Sea
  - elevation: 0 feet (0 m)
- Length: 1.7 km (1.1 mi)

Basin features
- Progression: Canas Urbano; Playa
- Tributaries
  - left: Río Pastillo
  - right: Rio Canas

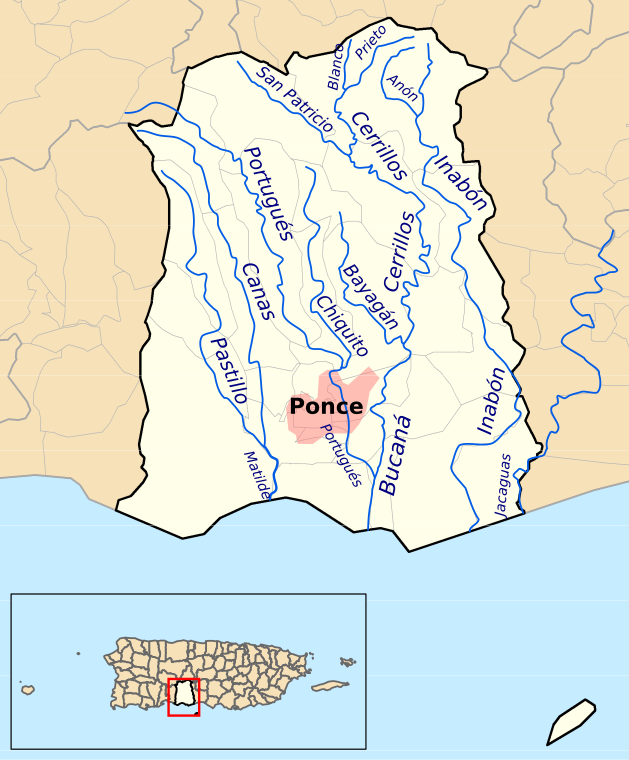
Map showing the location of Río Matilde among the other rivers in the municipality. The area in pink represents the urban zone of the city

Río Matilde is a short river in the municipality of Ponce, Puerto Rico. It forms from the confluence of Rio Pastillo and Rio Canas. Río Matilde is one of the 14 rivers in the municipality and, forming at an altitude of just 15 feet (4.6 m), it forms at an altitude lower than any other river in the municipality.

== Origin ==
The name Río Matilde has sometimes been used to refer to a segment of Río Pastillo, (Note: Rio Matilde has sometimes been erroneously called Río Pastillo. In particular a segment of that river (Río Pastillo) that flows into Río Matilde has been called Río Matilde. For example HERE (Informe Ecologico de Flora y Fauna, Proyecto Gasoducto del Sur: Peñuelas, Ponce, Juana Díaz, Santa Isabel, Salinas. For: Proyecto Gasoducto del Sur - Peñuelas, Ponce, Juana Díaz, Santa Isabel, Salinas. By: ENSR (Piscatway, NJ) - AEE (Autoridad de Energia Electrica). Page 19. Retrieved 26 November 2013.) states "Río Matilde: ... Hacia el Norte desde su intersección con la Quebrada del Agua se le conoce como Río Pastillo." Translated and paraphased: North of its intersection with Quebrada del Agua creek, Rio Matilde is known as Río Pastillo.) but Río Matilde actually results from the confluence of Río Pastillo and Río Canas. Río Pastillo joins from its easterly run in the western section of the municipality of Ponce, while Río Canas joins from its southerly run in the northwestern area of the municipality of Ponce, both merging to form Río Matilde at their confluence in Barrio Canas just west of Urbanizacion Rio Canas and north of PR-2 in Ponce.

== Features ==
At 1.7 kilometers (1.1 mi) long, Río Matilde is the shortest river in the municipality of Ponce. The river is approximately one mile long and empties into the Caribbean Sea at 17°58'55"N, 66°38'16"W in the area of Los Meros in Barrio Playa.

== Canalization ==
The Government of Puerto Rico has plans to canalize this river.

== Course ==
The following table summarizes the course of Rio Matilde in terms of roads crossed. Roads are listed as the river flows from its origin in the confluence of Rio Pastillo and Rio Canas, located in Barrio Canas, east of the city of Ponce, to its emptying into the Caribbean Sea in Barrio Playa in the south (N/A = Data not available):

No.	Barrio	Road	Road's km marker	NBI ID	Bridge name (if any)	Direction (of bridge traffic)	Coordinates	Notes
1	Canas Urbano	PR-2	225.5	8352	Unnamed	Westbound	18°59′44.8434″N 66°38′5.856″W	
2	Canas Urbano	PR-2	225.5	8752	Unnamed	Eastbound	18°59′44.34″N 66°38′5.856″W	
3	Playa	PR-52	107.8	24172	Unnamed	Westbound	17°59′31.128″N 66°38′12.444″W	
4	Playa	PR-52	107.8	24162	Unnamed	Eastbound	17°59′30.516″N 66°38′12.552″W	

== See also ==
- List of rivers of Puerto Rico
- List of rivers of Ponce
