= San Antón =

Barrio of Ponce, Puerto Rico

- Barrio
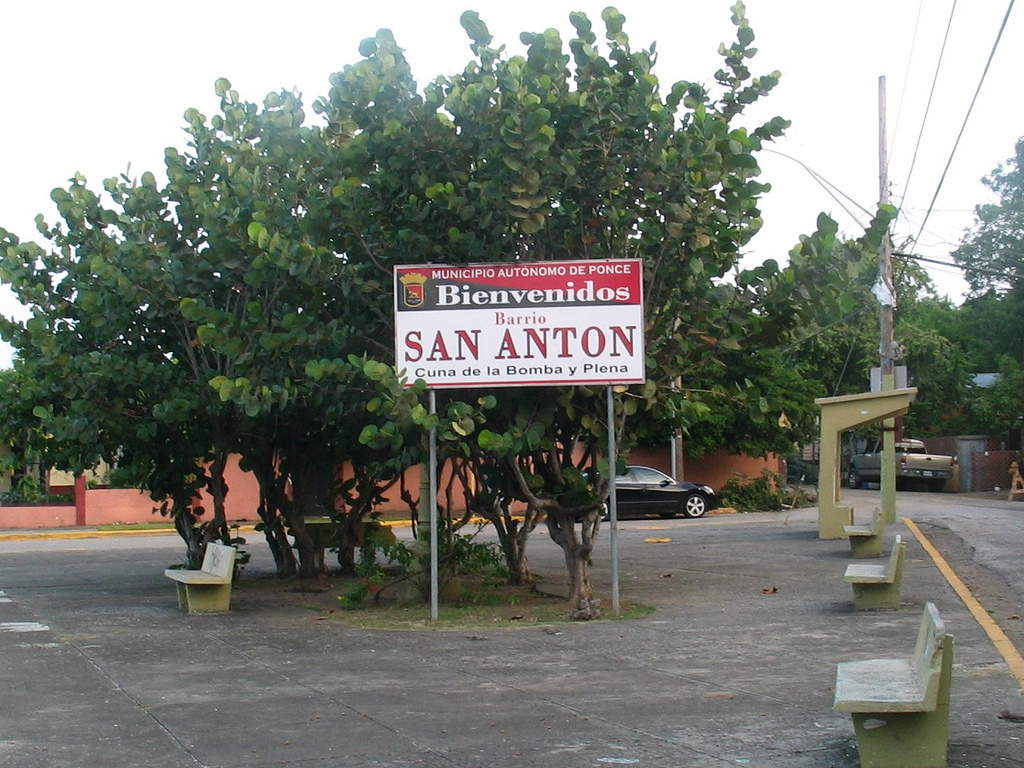
- Sign marking an entrance to Barrio San Antón
- Nickname: "Cuna de la Bomba y Plena" (Birthplace of the Bomba and Plena)
- Location of barrio San Antón within the municipality of Ponce shown in red

- Location of Puerto Rico
- Coordinates: 18°00′20″N 66°36′05″W
- Commonwealth: Puerto Rico
- Municipality: Ponce

Area
  - Total: 1.16 sq mi (3.0 km^{2})
  - Land: 1.13 sq mi (2.9 km^{2})
  - Water: 0.03 sq mi (0.078 km^{2})
- Elevation: 43 ft (13 m)

Population (2010)
  - Total: 10,992
  - Density: 9,727.4/sq mi (3,755.8/km^{2})
- Source: 2010 Census
- Time zone: UTC−4 (AST)

San Antón is one of the 31 barrios of the municipality of Ponce, Puerto Rico. Along with Canas Urbano, Machuelo Abajo, Magueyes Urbano, and Portugués Urbano, San Antón is one of the municipality's five originally rural barrios that are now also part of the urban zone of the city of Ponce. It is totally enclosed within the Ponce city limits. It was founded in 1818.

== History ==
San Antón is one of Ponce's oldest barrios. It is believed that this is where Spanish colonists first settled. It sits on the western bank of Rio Portugues. The name San Antón comes from the small chapel that Don Antonio Abad Rodríguez Berrios ordered to be built towards the end of the 16th century to honor San Antonio Abad. It was organized in 1831. In 2010, the Government of Puerto Rico declared it "Cuna de la Plena" (English: Birthplace of the plena).

== Location ==
San Antón is an urban barrio located in the southern section of the municipality, within the Ponce city limits, and southeast of the traditional center of the city, Plaza Las Delicias. The toponymy, or origin of the name, is related to the Catholic Church saint San Antonio Abad.

== Boundaries ==
San Anton is bounded on the North by Boulevard Miguel Pou/PR-1 and Nine Street (Calle 9) of Urb. Jardines Fagot, on the South by PR-2, on the West by Rio Portugues, Emilio Fagot Avenue, and Boulevard Miguel Pou/PR-1, and on the East by PR-2 (roughly) and Rio Bucana.

In terms of barrio-to-barrio boundaries, San Antón is bounded in the North by Machuelo Abajo and Sabanetas, in the South by Playa, in the West by Cuarto, Quinto, and Canas Urbano, and in the East by Sabanetas and Bucaná.

== Demographics ==
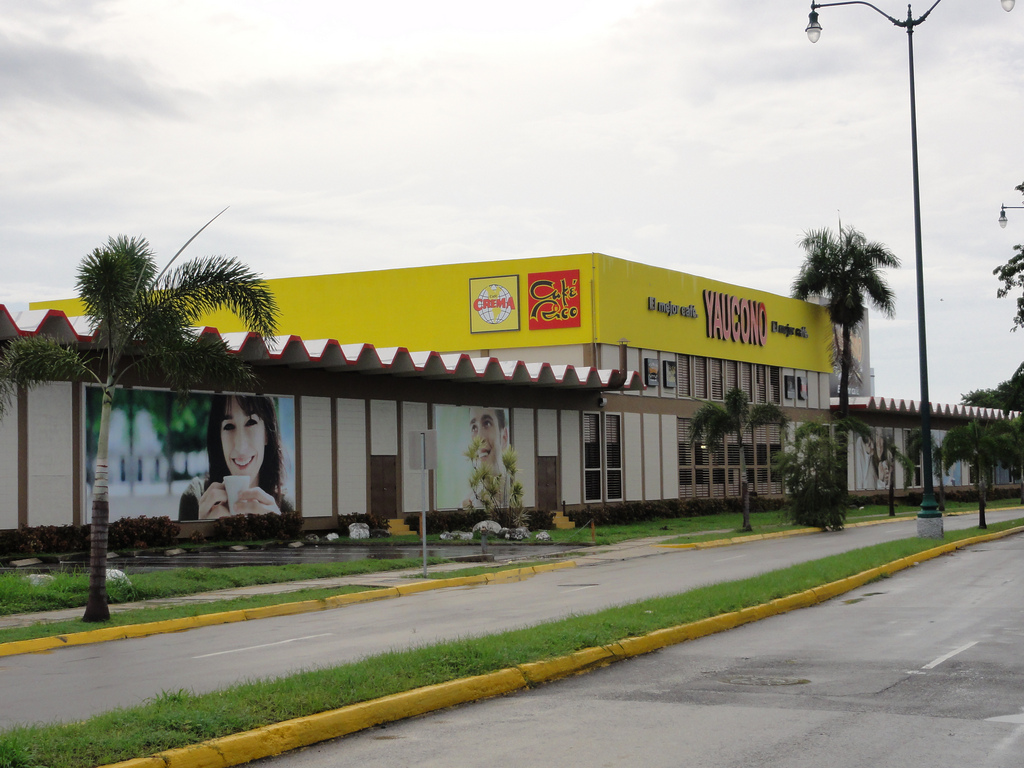
Café Rico headquarters in barrio San Antón

San Antón has an estimated 1.7 square miles (4.4 km^{2}) of land area and 0.1 square miles (260,000 m^{2}) of water area. In 2000, the population of San Antón was 11,271 persons, representing an estimated population density of 6,630 persons per square mile.

In 2010, the population of San Antón was 10,992 persons, and it had a density of 9,727.4 persons per square mile.

The communities of Caracoles, Constancia, Jardinet Fagot, Valle Verde, and San Anton (proper) are located in this barrio.

Historical population
Census	Pop.	Note	%±
1900	963		—
1910	1,163		20.8%
1920	1,237		6.4%
1930	1,904		53.9%
1940	2,385		25.3%
1950	4,417		85.2%
1960	7,488		69.5%
1970	12,980		73.3%
1980	11,219		−13.6%
1990	12,706		13.3%
2000	11,271		−11.3%
2010	10,992		−2.5%
U.S. Decennial Census; 1899 (shown as 1900) 1910-1930; 1930-1950 1960 1980-2000 2010

== San Anton proper ==
=== The neighborhood ===
Houses in this neighborhood are small, wooden houses, looking "as if they were a 'relic from the past" when contrasted with the modern, middle-class suburban homes in other parts of the Ponce, such as Constancia, which is next to the old, original San Anton proper, which is still standing. The two residential communities exist side-by-side along the fringes in urban Ponce. Compared to other nearby communities San Anton steadfastly clings to its traditions.

=== History ===
The 1950s introduced a period of economic transformation, and the emergence of the Ponce middle class. The era was characterized by the transition from agricultural capitalism to industrial capitalism. Immediately following World War II, the federal government encouraged the growth of industries, highways and development infrastructure, mass-produced single family homes and urban sprawl in Ponce and the rest of Puerto Rico. The rural agricultural lands that once encircled San Anton were rapidly absorbed and behind was left but a skeleton of the community that this neighborhood once was.

San Anton is often referred to as the "barrio of the freed slaves." The barrio houses the remaining progeny of the largest concentration of freed blacks in southern Puerto Rico. Surnames there such as Roque, Cabrera, Franceschi, Tricoche, Arce and Oppenheimer link the predominantly black residents of this barrio to their 19th century European and Creole "estate owners." The barrio is located in close proximity to what were sugar cane fields and three major central sugar mills, Mercedita, Hacienda La Fe, and Hacienda Teresa. When the enslaved peoples received their freedom in 1873, the former masters passed on land rights to some residents; while others migrated to San Anton from nearby municipalities or distant Caribbean islands. Besides its working class contributions, San Anton is recognized nationally and internationally for its contributions to the development of the Puerto Rican popular music of Bomba and Plena. Over the years, the community also offered up a disproportionate number of accomplished artists, athletes and popular hero(ine)s. By the early 1960s, however, pivotal political decisions gave way to a massive "development" program, which encouraged the disintegration of the larger San Anton barrio and produced a decline in its cultural production. Most of the residents were displaced to newly constructed housing projects, while others migrated north to the San Juan Metropolitan center or to New York City.

=== Transition ===
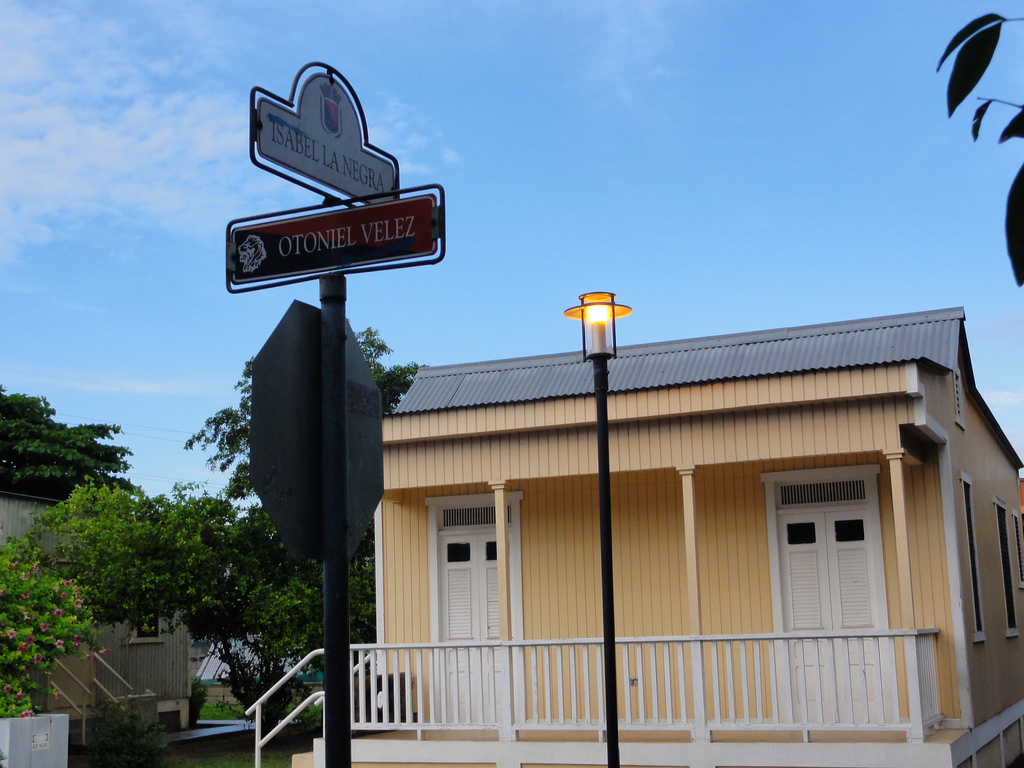
Street sign on Isabel la Negra Street in Barrio San Antón

The remnants of the San Anton of old were described in the 1960s as "dilapidated wooden houses shielded with scraps of galvanized sheeting, crooked alleys, abandoned open spaces, stagnant water" and other such phrases.

By 1992, the area's zoning was changed from medium density residential zoning (R-3), to the category of "Conceptual Development/ Redevelopment Area". This change implied a shift from medium density residential (no retail businesses) to an open category that allowed for commercial, industrial, residential, or combined land use. A connector road was scheduled to pass through the community, in order to connect the regional highway network to nearby vacant lands.

One author notes that given these changes, it was obvious that time and development had placed the residents of this barrio in a position of no return. "Regional infrastructural expansion, the potential increase in area property values, the community's proximity to the central business district and major transportation routes, the area's mature landscape, and relatively undeveloped lands are sure to encourage speculation and future commercial development."

=== The 'Ponce en Marcha' plan ===
In the early 1990s the city of Ponce was undergoing a massive revitalization program, known as "Ponce en Marcha." The "Ponce en Marcha" plan sought to recuperate the Ponce's urban center, and restore the architectural qualities of the city's golden age of the 19th and early 20th centuries. The program encompassed the historic zone, transportation routes, tourism, and improvements to the urban infrastructure. The city also targeted several low-income communities for revitalization. These included the popular neighborhoods of Arenas de Betances (at Mayor Street) and 25 de Enero Street.

Although, the San Anton neighborhood was also programmed for revitalization, a question of legitimacy quickly arose, questioning whether San Anton had revitalization merit. "The municipal government proposed to "align" (urbanize) the existing residential structures in San Anton while maintaining the typology of "how San Anton appeared in the days of yesteryear." By allotting individual parcels, the Office of Housing and Community Development reasoned that San Anton would become more efficient and modernized. In reality, this view implied reorganizing San Anton's spatial patterns to suit the administrative interests of the Ponce municipal government. The municipal government was less concerned about the tangible and invisible spatial characteristics of the barrio that encouraged security, social contact, relationships, and the perpetuation of local understandings among its residents.

One dissenting urban planner asserted that: "It is certain that the San Anton barrio is one of the poorest communities in Ponce, and that it is at an advanced state of physical degradation. However, one cannot overlook the need to conserve the neighborhood's social and urban characteristics. San Anton's 'organic' development patterns have contributed significantly to the community's quality of life which is conserved to this day, and which contemporary urban developments are often unable to achieve"

=== Resident complaints ===
Residents revolted against the government's plans for their community. For example, San Anton resident and school teacher Maria Judith Banchs Cabrera described San Anton's spatial and social traditions indicating that every family yard has its own particular characteristics, and way of life, which have developed over the years and that these understandings bypass the findings any sociological report that the municipality may have engaged in. It became clear to the municipal government that if they removed a person from their property, they would be taking them away from their origins, their ancestors, and thus aligning the properties would cause problems. It recognized that most architects did not understand this sociological element.

=== Today ===
In the end the City had to yield to most resident demands. The residents, for their part, seeing the benefits that revitalization elsewhere in Ponce had brought to those communities conceded to giving it a try also and, by 1998, the neighborhood was revitalized. By 2000 approximately 40 San Anton households moved into their new homes which still conserved the spatial arrangement the residents were used to. New water lines were installed, and street lighting, sidewalks, and cul-de-sac layouts are now an integral part of San Anton.

=== Legacy ===
A music video by local recording star, Ednita Nazario, was filmed against the backdrop of the renewed community.

== Notable landmarks ==
San Anton is home to the Ceiba Tree Park. San Anton proper has a small park named "Rafael "Caró" Maldonado".

== Notable people from San Antón ==
- Isabel la Negra
- Jorge Roque
- Felix Maldonado
- Luis Antonio ("Mambo") de León Tricoche
- Wichie Torres
- Juan "Papo" Franceschi
- Otto Velez

== Gallery ==
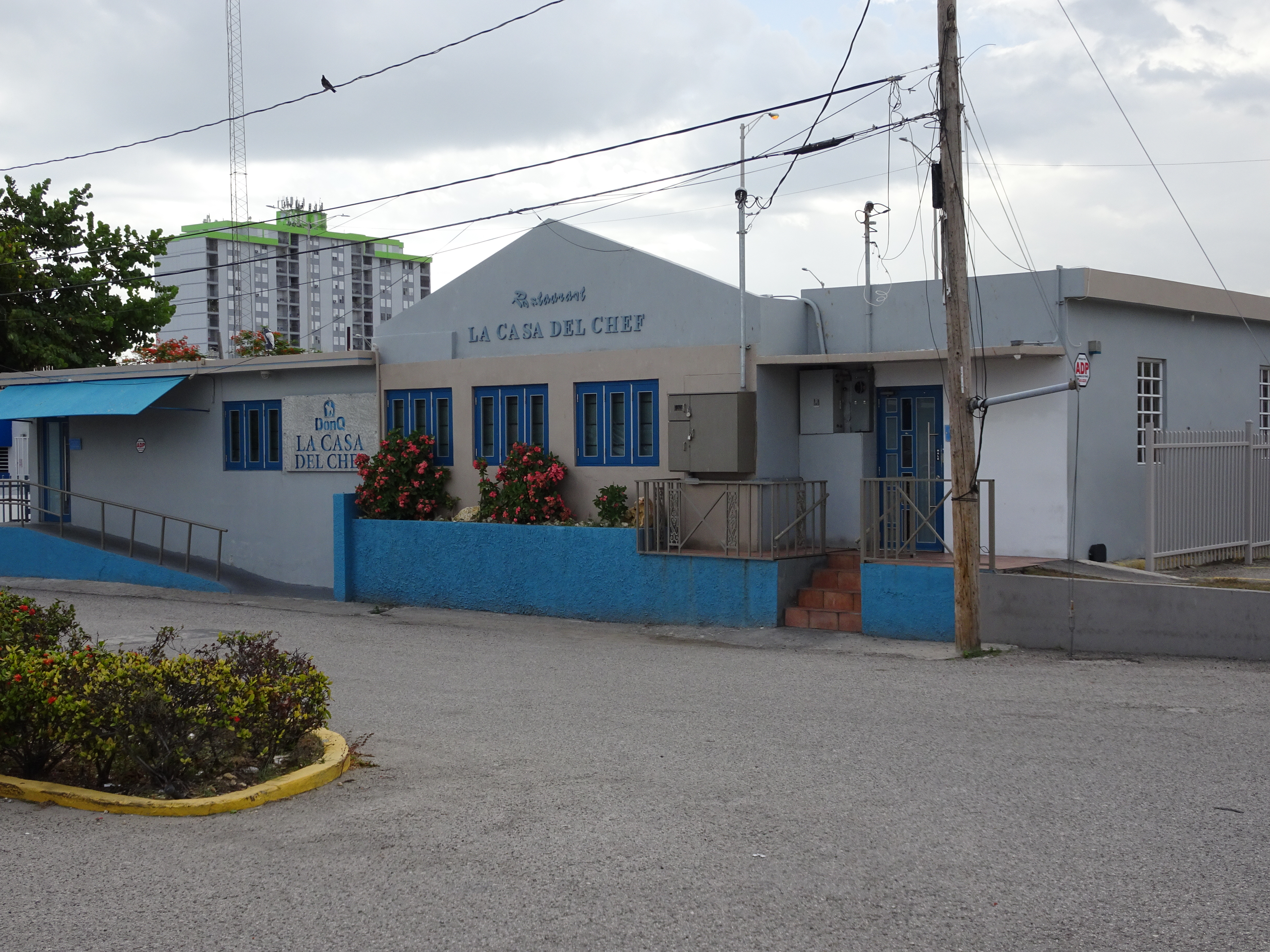
Puerto Rican food restaurant on the campus of Centro del Sur Mall

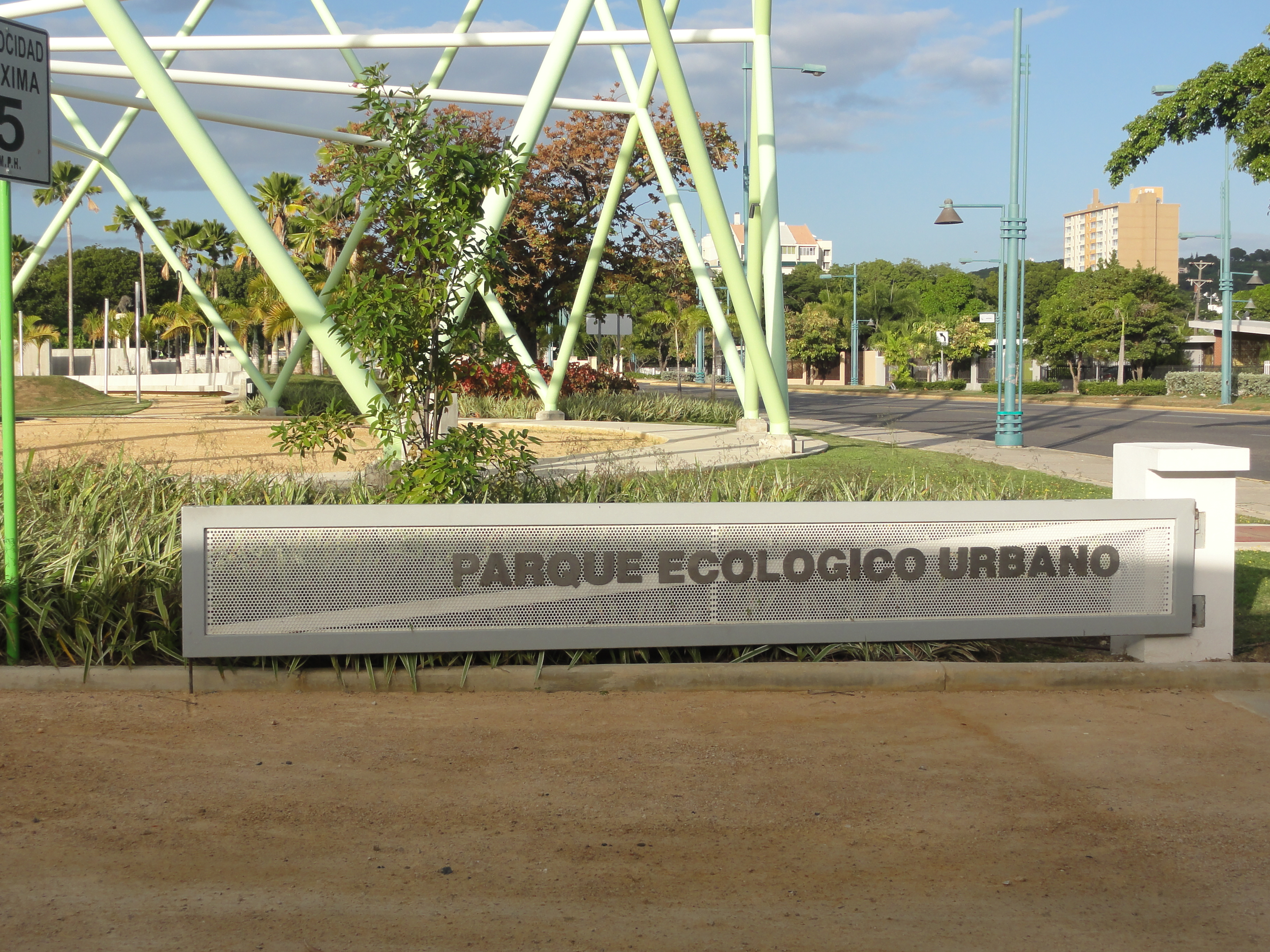
Ecology-themed park on Bulevar Miguel Pou

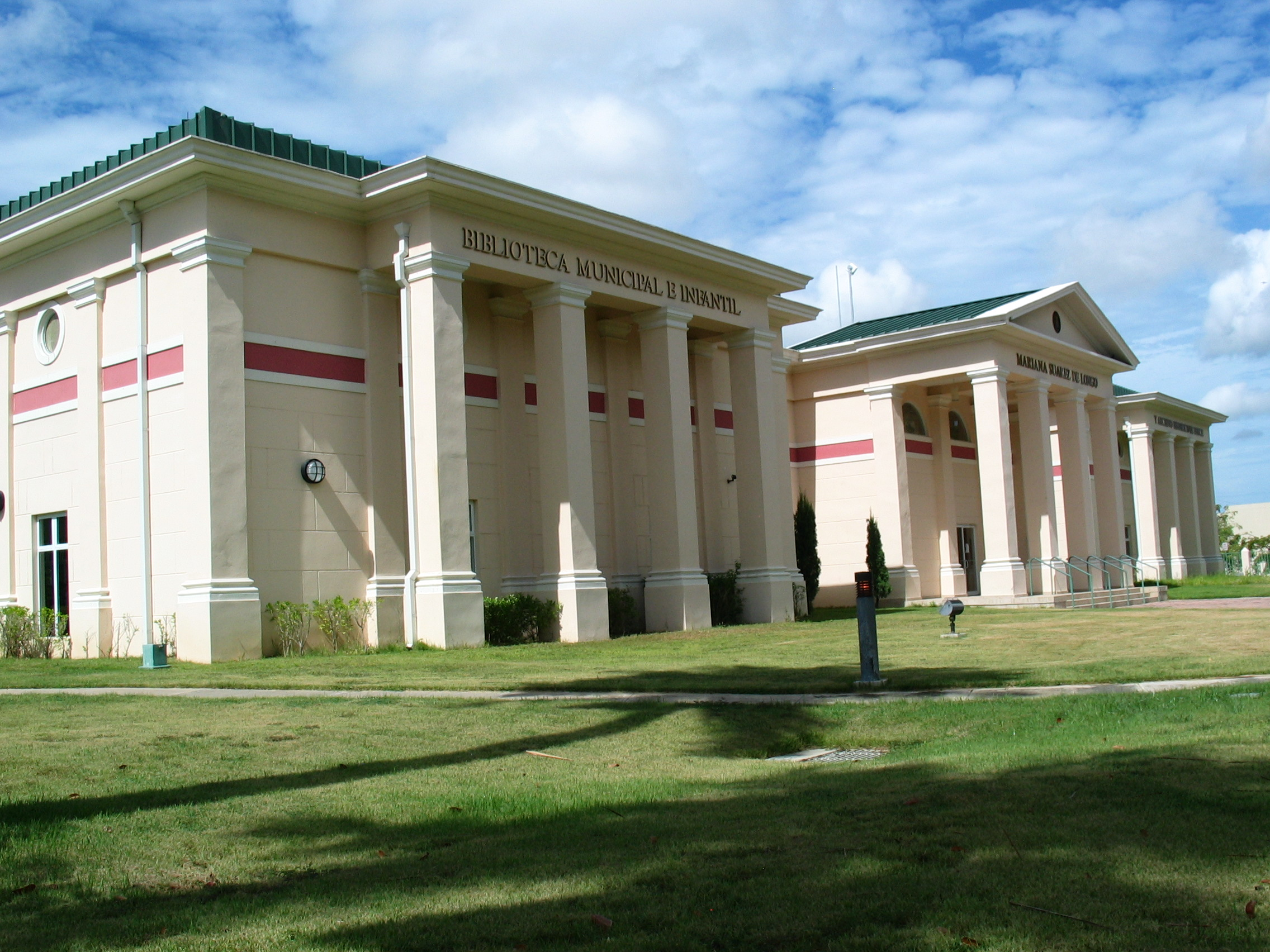
Ponce Municipal Library on Bulevar Miguel Pou

== See also ==
- List of communities in Puerto Rico
