= Playa, Ponce, Puerto Rico =

Barrio of Puerto Rico

Playa
- Barrio
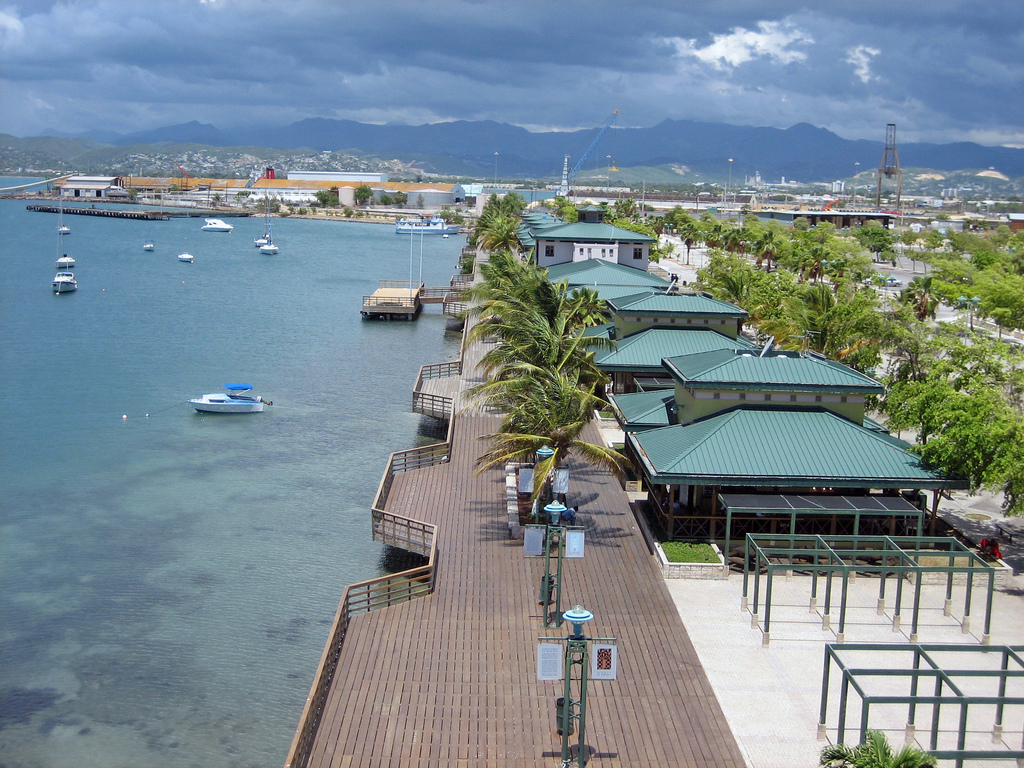
- La Guancha Boardwalk, one of the landmarks in Barrio Playa

- Location of barrio Playa within the municipality of Ponce shown in red
- Coordinates: 17°58′13″N 66°36′16″W
- Commonwealth: Puerto Rico
- Municipality: Ponce

Area
  - Total: 14.99 sq mi (38.8 km^{2})
  - Land: 4.39 sq mi (11.4 km^{2})
  - Water: 10.60 sq mi (27.5 km^{2})
- Elevation: 0 ft (0 m)

Population (2010)
  - Total: 14,077
  - Density: 3,206.6/sq mi (1,238.1/km^{2})
- Source: 2010 Census
- Time zone: UTC−4 (AST)

Barrio Playa, also known as Playa de Ponce, Ponce Playa, or La Playa, is one of the thirty-one barrios that comprise the municipality of Ponce, Puerto Rico. Along with Bucaná, Canas, Vayas, and Capitanejo, Playa is one of the municipality's five coastal barrios. Barrio Playa also incorporates several islands, the largest of which is Caja de Muertos. It was founded in 1831.

== Location ==
Playa is an urban barrio located in the southern region of the municipality, within the limits of the city of Ponce, south of the traditional center of the city at Plaza Las Delicias, and on the shores of the Caribbean Sea. It is located at 17.9839°N 66.6128°W, and it has an elevation of 10 feet. The toponymy, or origin of the name, describes the geographic area the barrio occupies in southern Ponce and facing the Caribbean Sea.

== Boundaries ==
It is bounded on the North by PR-2, on the South by the Caribbean Sea, on the West by Río Matilde, and on the East by Río Bucaná.

In terms of barrio-to-barrio boundaries, Playa is bounded in the North by Canas Urbano and San Anton, in the South by the Caribbean Sea, in the West by Canas, and in the East by Bucaná.

== Features and demographics ==
Unlike most other barrios of Ponce, Playa's landscape is entirely flat. Playa also has the second longest coastline of all five of Ponce's coastal barrios, after Canas. Playa has 4.6 square miles (12 km^{2}) of land area and no water area.

In 2000, the population of Playa was 4,761 persons, and it had a density of 1,031 persons per square mile. The communities of Villa del Carmen, Valle Real, Villa Tabaiba, Salistral, El Caribe, Puerto Viejo, Los Meros, Amalia Marin, Lirios del Sur, and Playa proper are found here.

In 2010, the population of Playa was 14,077 persons, and it had a density of 3,206.6 persons per square mile.

This barrio, or ward, has its own plaza giving it the character of a municipality within a municipality. It has a residential area, a tourist area called La Guancha, and a harbor, Puerto de Ponce.

Playa has the second longest coastline of all five coastal barrios in Ponce, after Canas.

Historical population
Census	Pop.	Note	%±
1900	4,660		—
1910	5,181		11.2%
1920	4,717		−9.0%
1930	6,172		30.8%
1940	5,608		−9.1%
1950	12,472		122.4%
1970	15,574		—
1980	20,253		30.0%
1990	18,027		−11.0%
2000	16,926		−6.1%
2010	14,077		−16.8%
U.S. Decennial Census; 1899 (shown as 1900) 1910-1930; 1930-1950 1960 1980-2000 2010

== Infrastructure ==
Major roads serving Barrio Playa are PR-52, PR-2, PR-12, PR-123, and PR-585.

== History ==
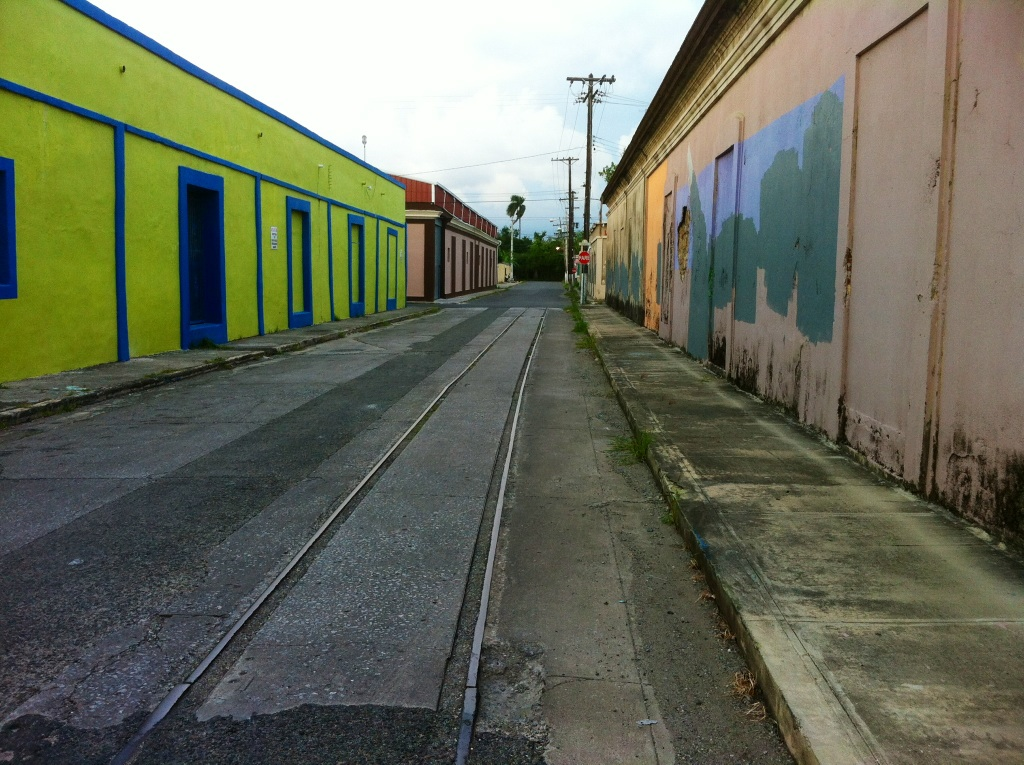
Deserted street in harbor warehouse area with defunct street rail line of Playa

As the major means of external communication for the settlement that was to become the city of Ponce, barrio Playa has a history that is as old as the history of the city of Ponce itself, thus dating back to the 16th century. During the 16th century, barrio Playa was called Montones. Subsequently, during the 17th and 18th centuries, significant contraband took place on these shores as well as attempts to attack and ransack the Playa settlement. A lookout post was set up in El Vigia to warn the city of the need of help in the Playa harbor, a port settlement at the time.

By the 1830s, la Playa had one of the best roads in Puerto Rico, connecting the shore settlement to the city proper, and it was the center of Ponce's commercial activity. It subsequently also got the first phone lines in Ponce and was also the first one to get railroad service from downtown Ponce.

Unfortunately, in 1845 a significant fire occurred in La Playa. The fire destroyed Playa and most of the Ponce vicinity. It significantly damaged the Spanish Customs House in Ponce, this being one of the few building left standing after the fire. The fire burned down the major buildings of the "Marina de Ponce". This moved Puerto Rico governor Conde de Marisol to create a new voluntary fire-fighting organization island-wide.

In 1887 the Spanish government built a lighthouse at Caja de Muertos Light on an island by the same name just off the coast of barrio Playa. This was followed by the building of Cayo Cardona lighthouse in 1889, on a small island at the entrance of the Ponce harbor. Both of these islands are part of barrio Playa.

By 1913, Playa was "a dynamic neighborhood with a self-sustained urban development with a population of 5,169 distributed through a residential area dominated by wooden houses, sugar cane farms, churches, schools, hospitals, a cemetery and local indiustries that promoted the formation of a strong artisan and industrial workers class." Playa is considered Puerto Rico's first planned suburban area.

In 1929, La Playa was the place where Dr. Manuel de la Pila Iglesias worked for the U.S. federal government with such distinction as to earn him the title "physician of physicians."

Today, Playa is a mostly low-income barrio of Ponce, and thus this is where Isolina Ferré founded her "Centro de Orientacion de la Playa" hospital and school that would earn her the U.S. Presidential Medal of Freedom in 1999. The Ponce Playa Diagnostic and Treatment Center was also founded in barrio Playa de Ponce.

== Landmarks ==
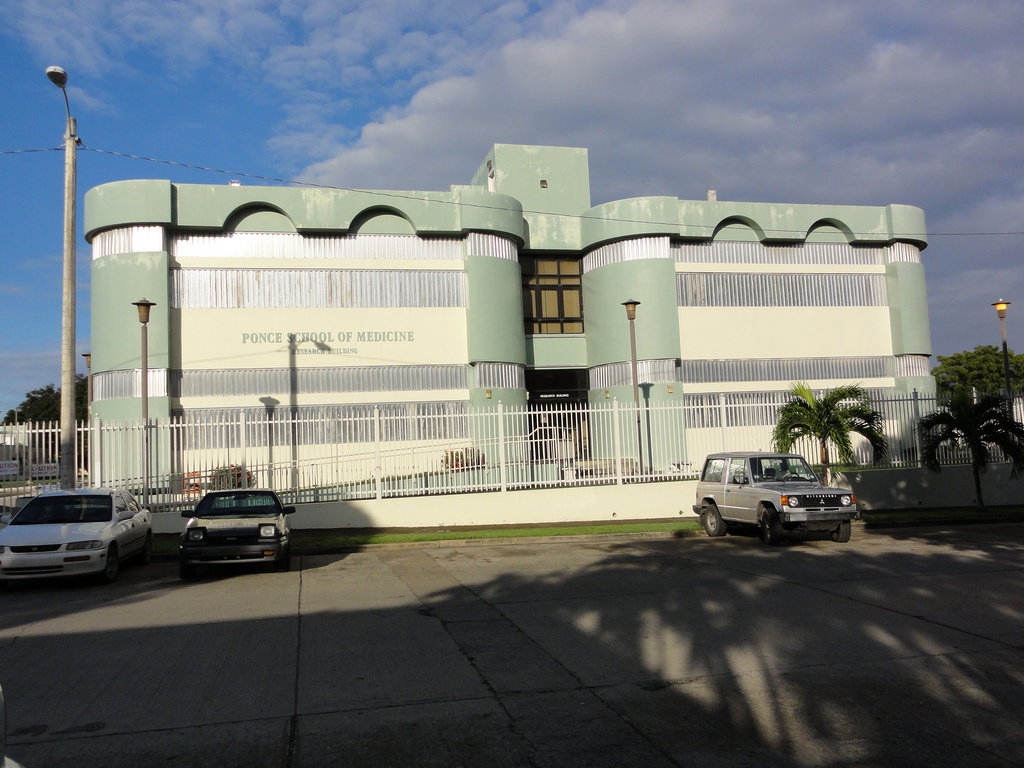
Ponce Health Sciences University on PR-2, Barrio Playa

Playa is home to a mix of Ponce and Puerto Rico landmarks: Puerto Rico Iron Works foundry, Plaza del Caribe mall, Club Náutico de Ponce yacht club, La Guancha boardwalk, and Caja de Muertos natural reserve are all located in Barrio Playa. The historic Cardona Island Light, Caja de Muertos Lighthouse, United States Custom House and McCabe Memorial Church, all National Register of Historic Places listed landmarks, are also located in Barrio Playa. Playa also has the most important Caribbean seaport in Puerto Rico, called Port of the Americas.

== Notable natives and residents ==
People from La Playa are called "playeros".

- Rafael Cordero Santiago, mayor of Ponce (1988–2004)
- Javier Culson, Olympic medal winner track-and-field athlete
- Carmen Nydia Velázquez, comedian and singer
- Jaime L. Drew, educator, writer, civil servant and engineer
- José "Chegüi" Torres, professional boxer
- Carmen Nydia Velázquez, actress and singer

== Gallery ==
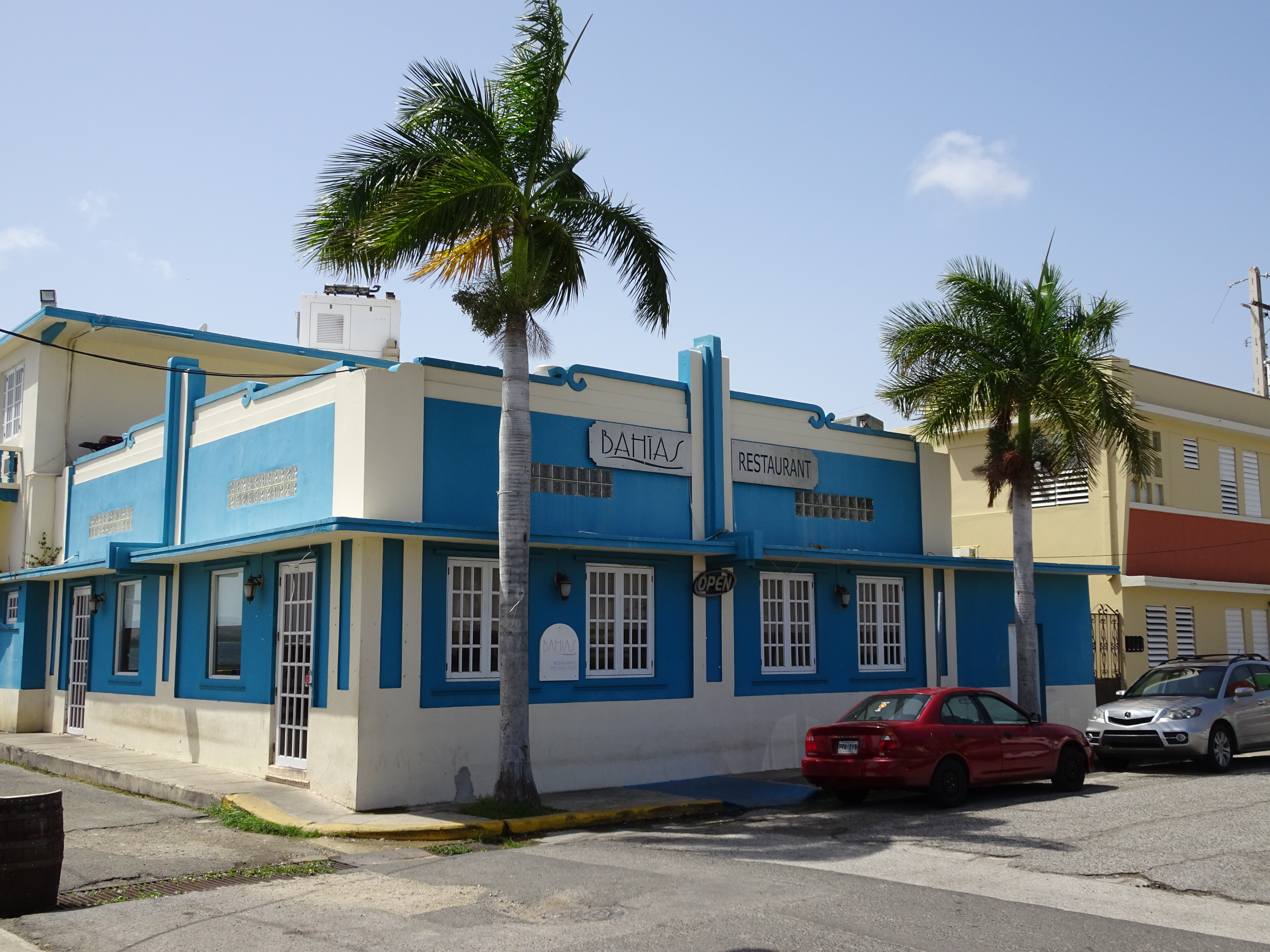
Sea food restaurant facing the Caribbean Sea on Calle Alfonso XII

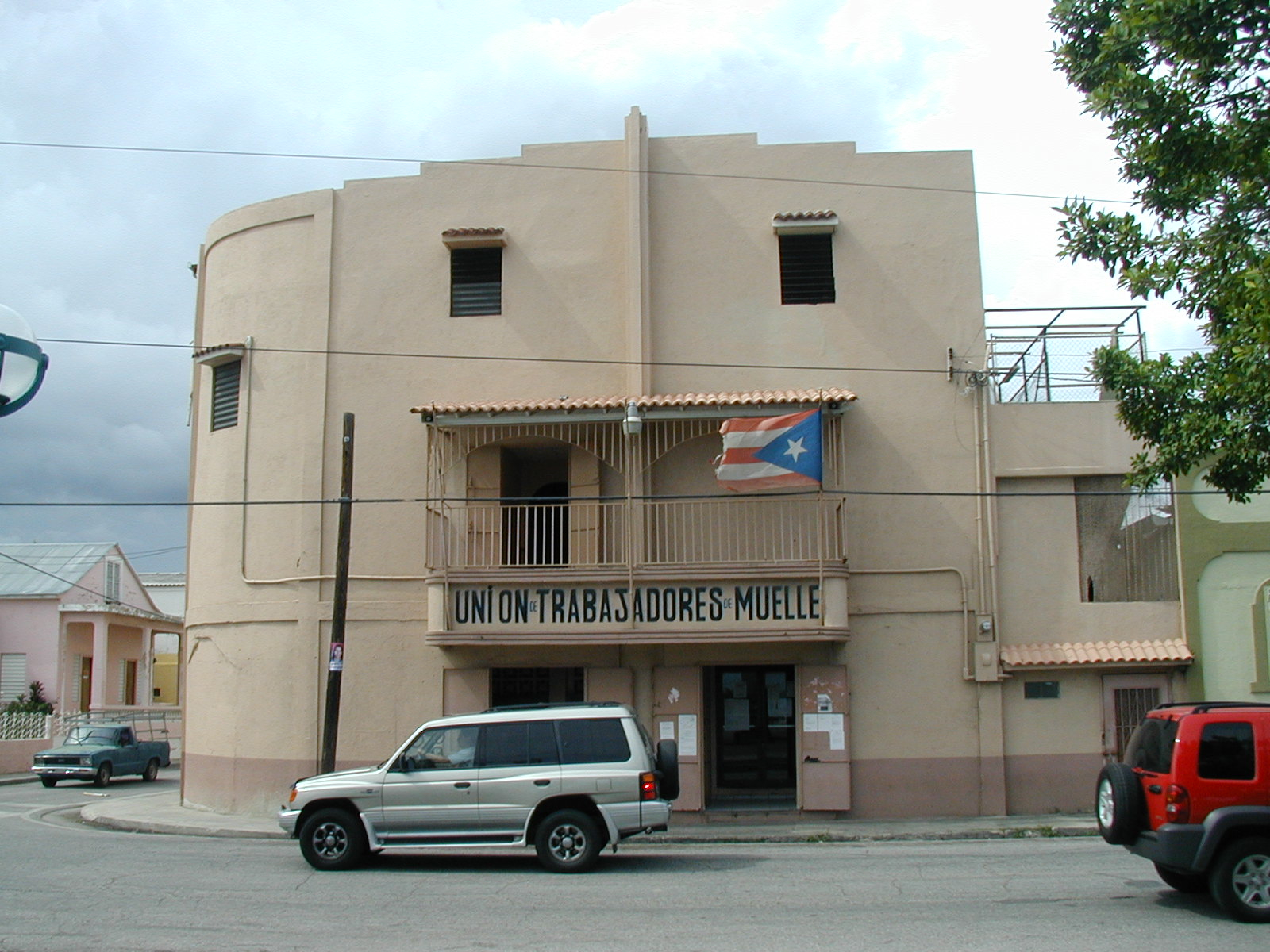
Dockworkers' union building in Playa

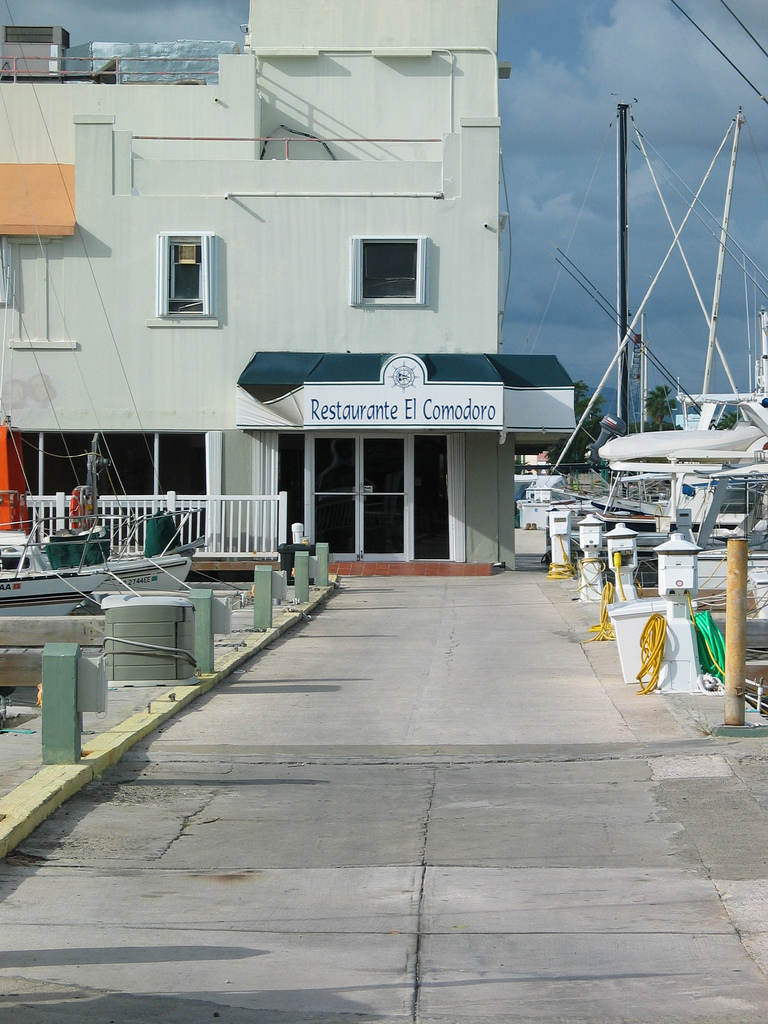
Seafood restaurant at Club Nautico de Ponce

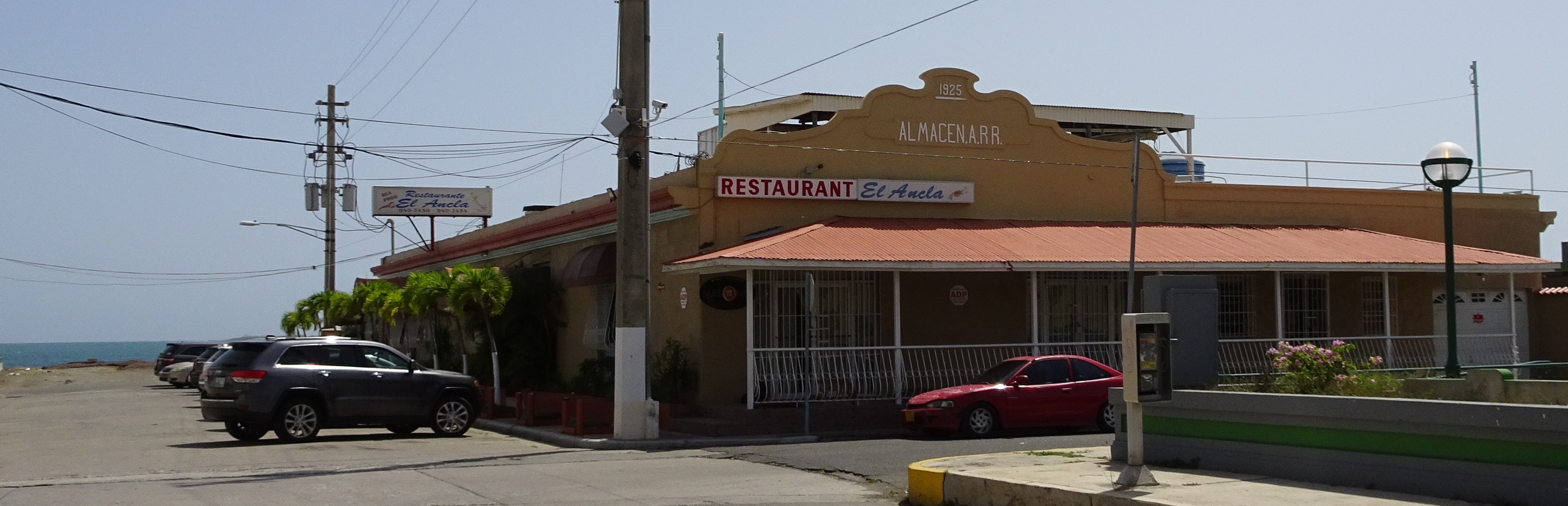
Sea-front Puerto Rican and sea food restaurant at historic train depot on Avenida Hostos Final

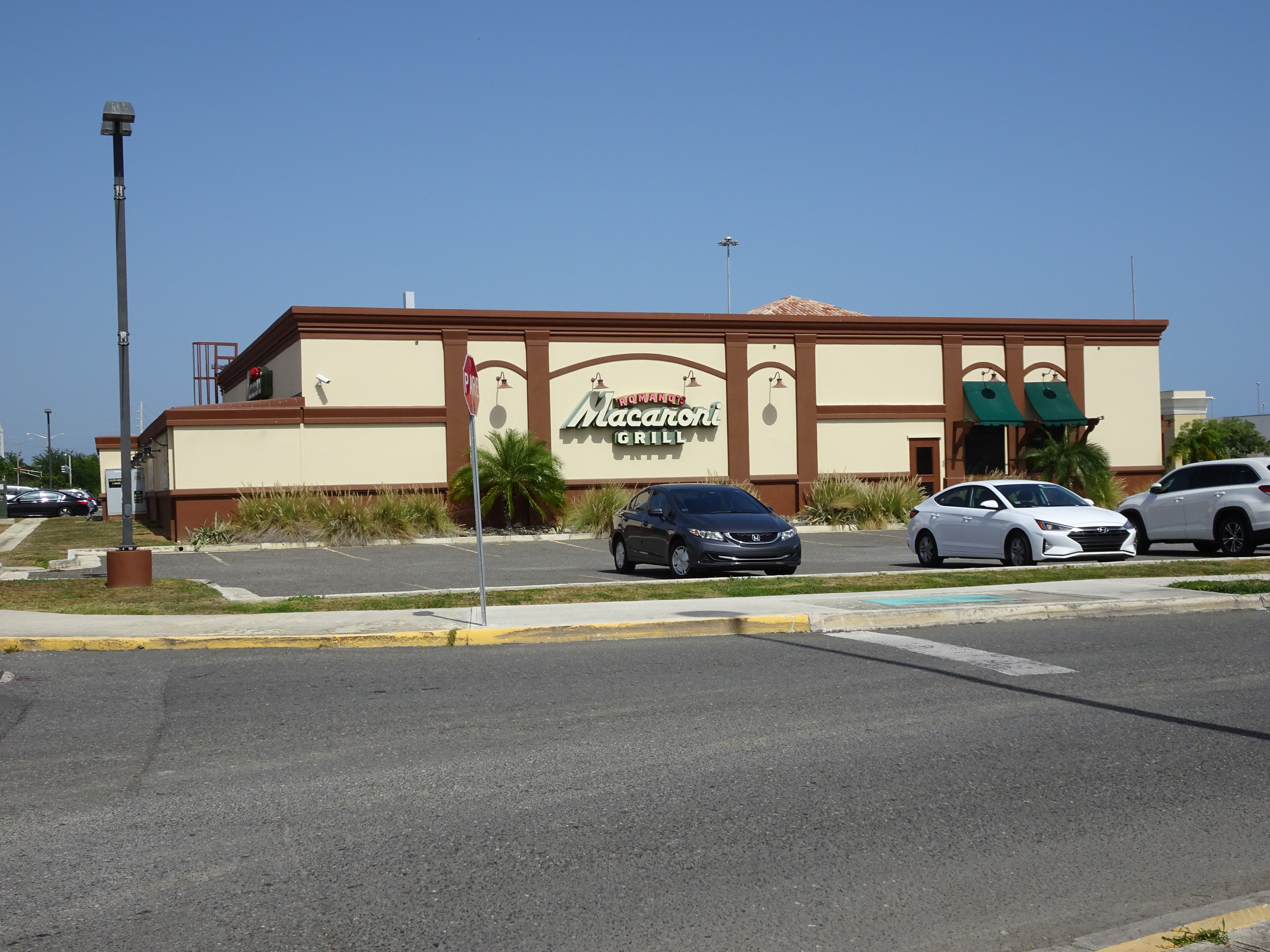
Italian restaurant on the campus of Plaza del Caribe mall

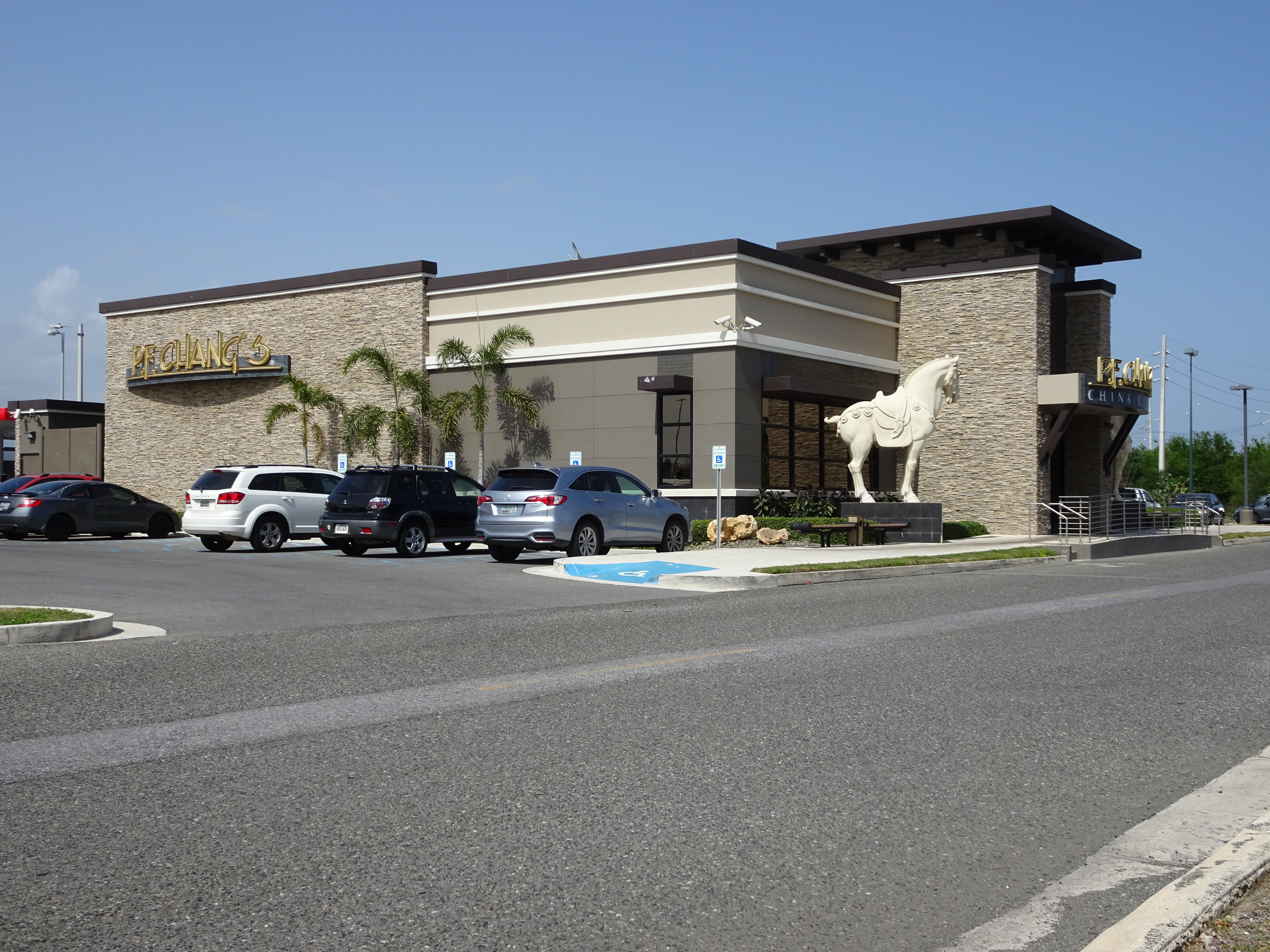
Chinese restaurant on the campus of Plaza del Caribe mall

== See also ==
- List of communities in Puerto Rico
- Carnaval de Vejigantes
- Fuerte de San José
