= Canas Urbano =

Barrio of Ponce, Puerto Rico

- Barrio
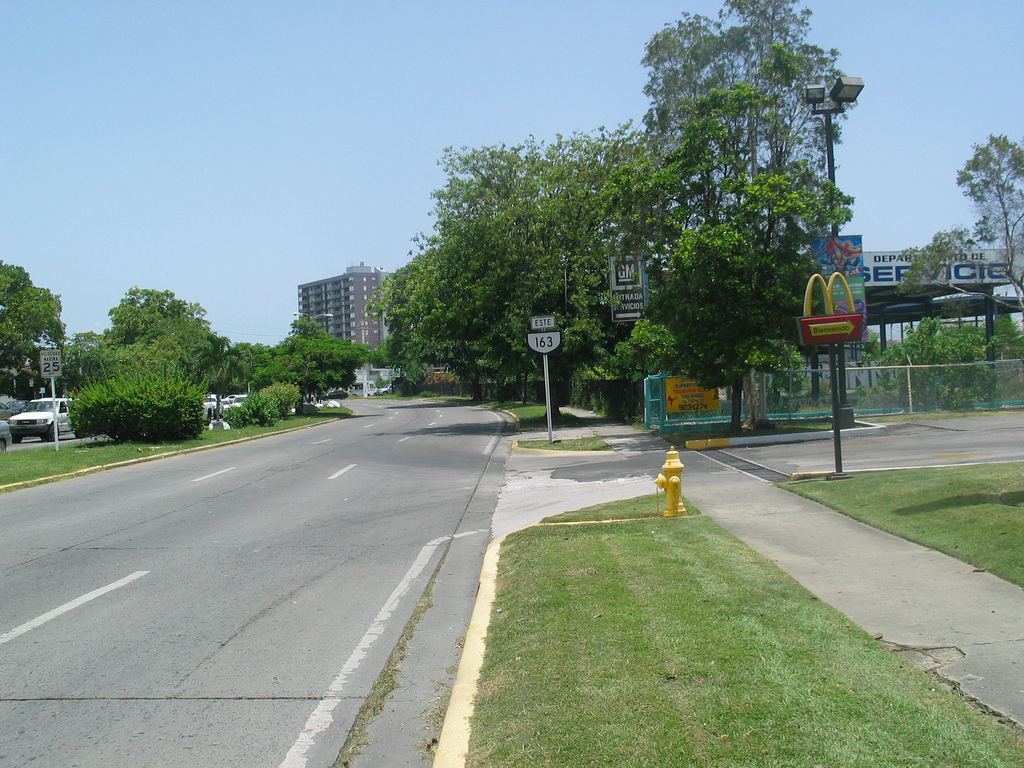
- Scene in Barrio Canas Urbano at Avenida Las Américas, looking east, near Carretera Pámpanos

- Location of barrio Canas Urbano within the municipality of Ponce shown in red

- Location of Puerto Rico
- Coordinates: 18°00′24″N 66°37′53″W
- Commonwealth: Puerto Rico
- Municipality: Ponce

Area
  - Total: 2.31 sq mi (6.0 km^{2})
  - Land: 2.31 sq mi (6.0 km^{2})
  - Water: 0 sq mi (0 km^{2})
- Elevation: 33 ft (10 m)

Population (2010)
  - Total: 17,933
  - Density: 7,763.2/sq mi (2,997.4/km^{2})
- Source: 2010 Census
- Time zone: UTC−4 (AST)

Canas Urbano is one of the 31 barrio of the municipality of Ponce, Puerto Rico. Along with Machuelo Abajo, Magueyes Urbano, Portugués Urbano, and San Antón, Canas Urbano is one of the municipality's five originally rural barrios that are now also part of the urban zone of the city of Ponce. The name of this barrio is of native indigenous origin. It was created in 1953.

== Location ==
Canas Urbano is an urban quarter located in the southern section of the municipality, within the Ponce city limits, and southwest of the traditional center of the city, Plaza Las Delicias.

== Boundaries ==
It is bounded on the North by Ponceña Street/PR-123, by Ausencia, La Gloria, Novedades, and Idilid Streets of Morel Campos, by Ten Street of Shanghai, Villa Street/Simon Bolivar Avenue, Palo de Pan Street, Dr. Ferran Street, Ferrocarril Street, and Ramon Powell Street, on the South by PR-2, on the West by PR-132 (roughly), Río Pastillo (roughly), and Rio Canas, and on the East by Global Street, Coto Canas Street/PR-2R/Pámpanos Road, and the old western branch of Rio Portugues.

In terms of barrio-to-barrio boundaries, Canas Urbano is bounded in the North by Magueyes Urbano, Portugués Urbano, Segundo, Primero, and Cuarto, in the South by Canas and Playa, in the West by Canas, and San Anton, and in the East by Segundo, Primero, and San Anton.

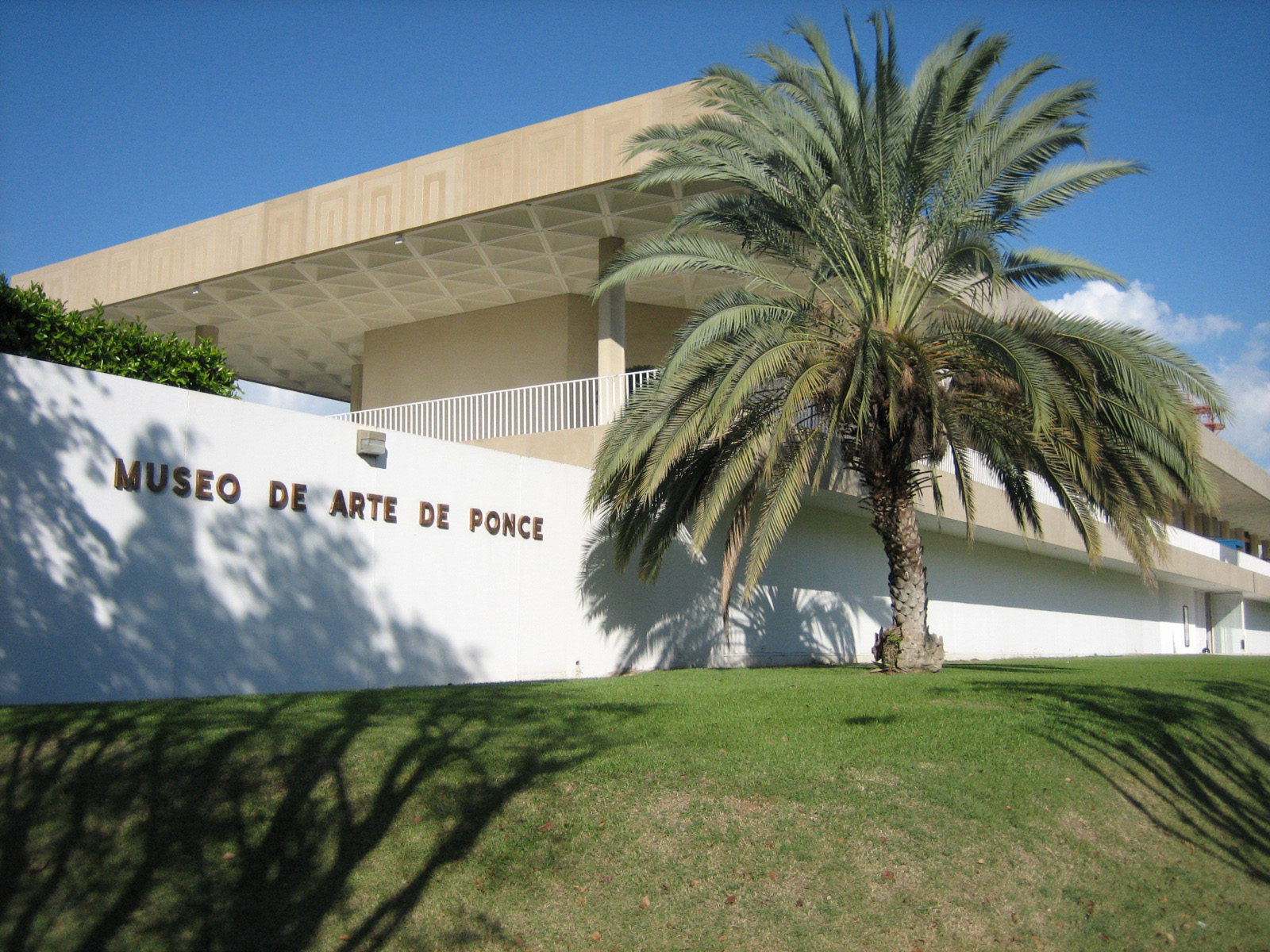
The Museo de Arte de Ponce, a mecca for the arts in Puerto Rico, is located in northern Canas Urbano.

== Features and demographics ==
Canas Urbano has 2.3 square miles (6.0 km^{2}) of land area and no water area. In 2000, the population of Canas Urbano was 21,482 persons, and it had a density of 9,301 persons per square mile.

In 2010, the population of Canas Urbano was 17,933 persons, and it had a density of 7,763.2 persons per square mile.

The communities of Jardines del Caribe (first and second sections only), Morel Campos, Shanghai, Aristides Chavier, Baldorioty, San Antonio, Rio Canas, Los Maestros, Santa Maria, Perla del Sur, Villa Grillasca, and Reparto Universitario are found here. Villa Grillasca was built in the 1950s and consisted of 720 duplex-style homes.

== Notable landmarks ==
Barrio Canas Urbano is home to the Juan Pachín Vicéns Auditorium, Francisco Montaner Stadium, and the Pontifical Catholic University of Puerto Rico and various other important landmarks.

== Gallery ==
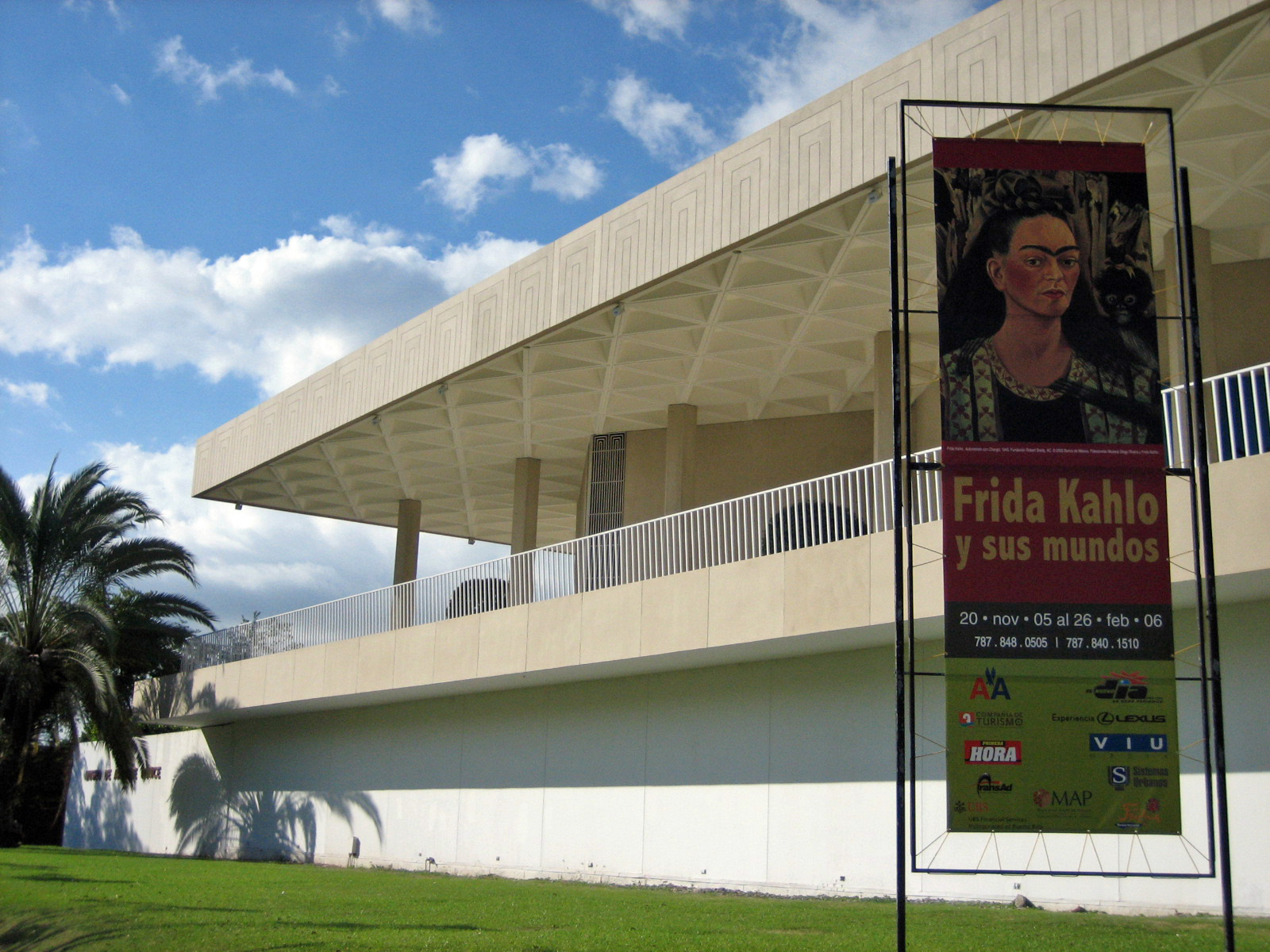
Museo de Arte de Ponce, on Avenida Las Américas

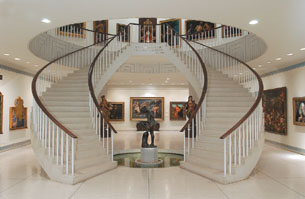
Interior of Museo de Arte de Ponce on Avenida Las Américas

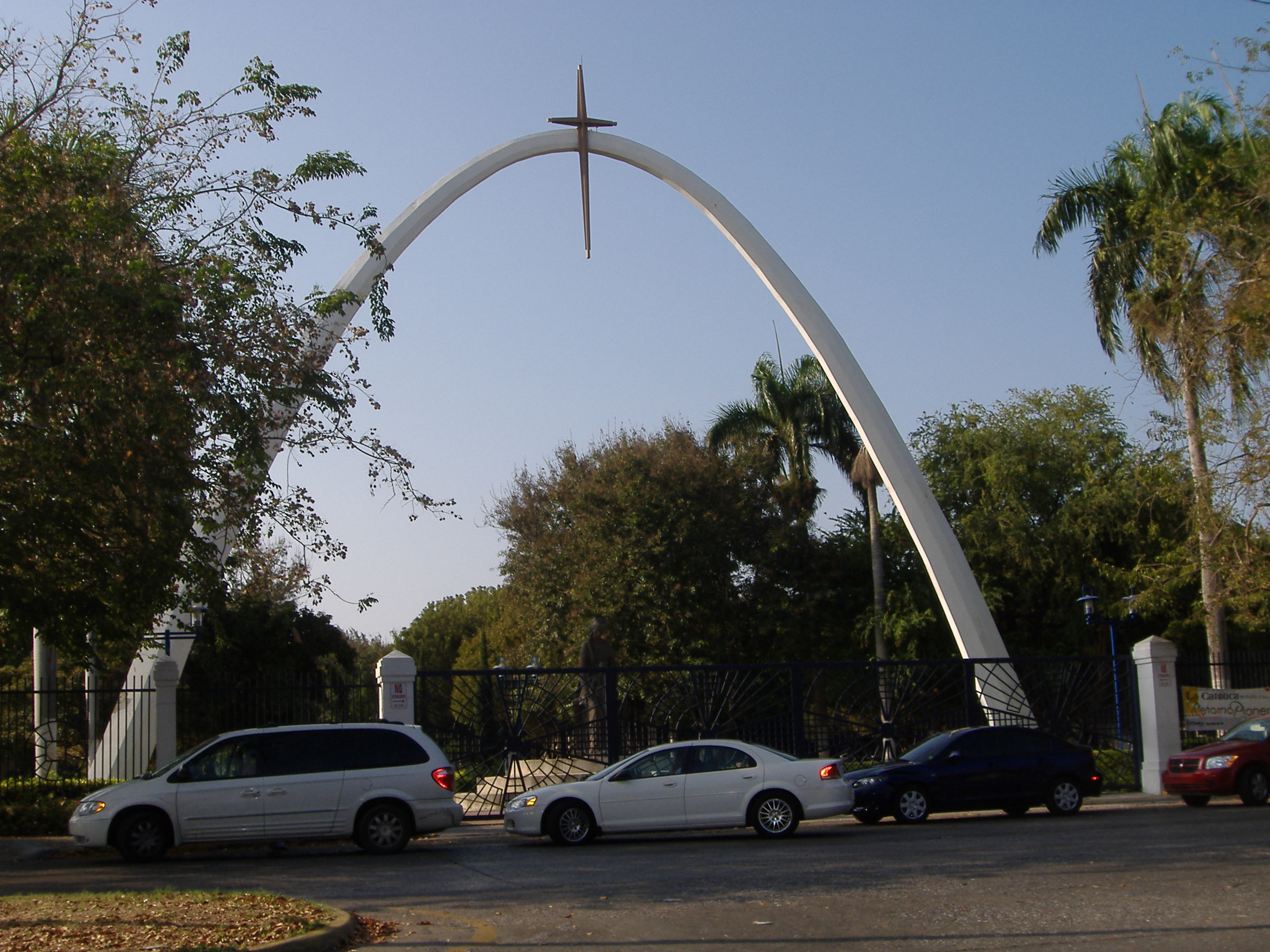
Universidad Católica on Avenida Las Américas

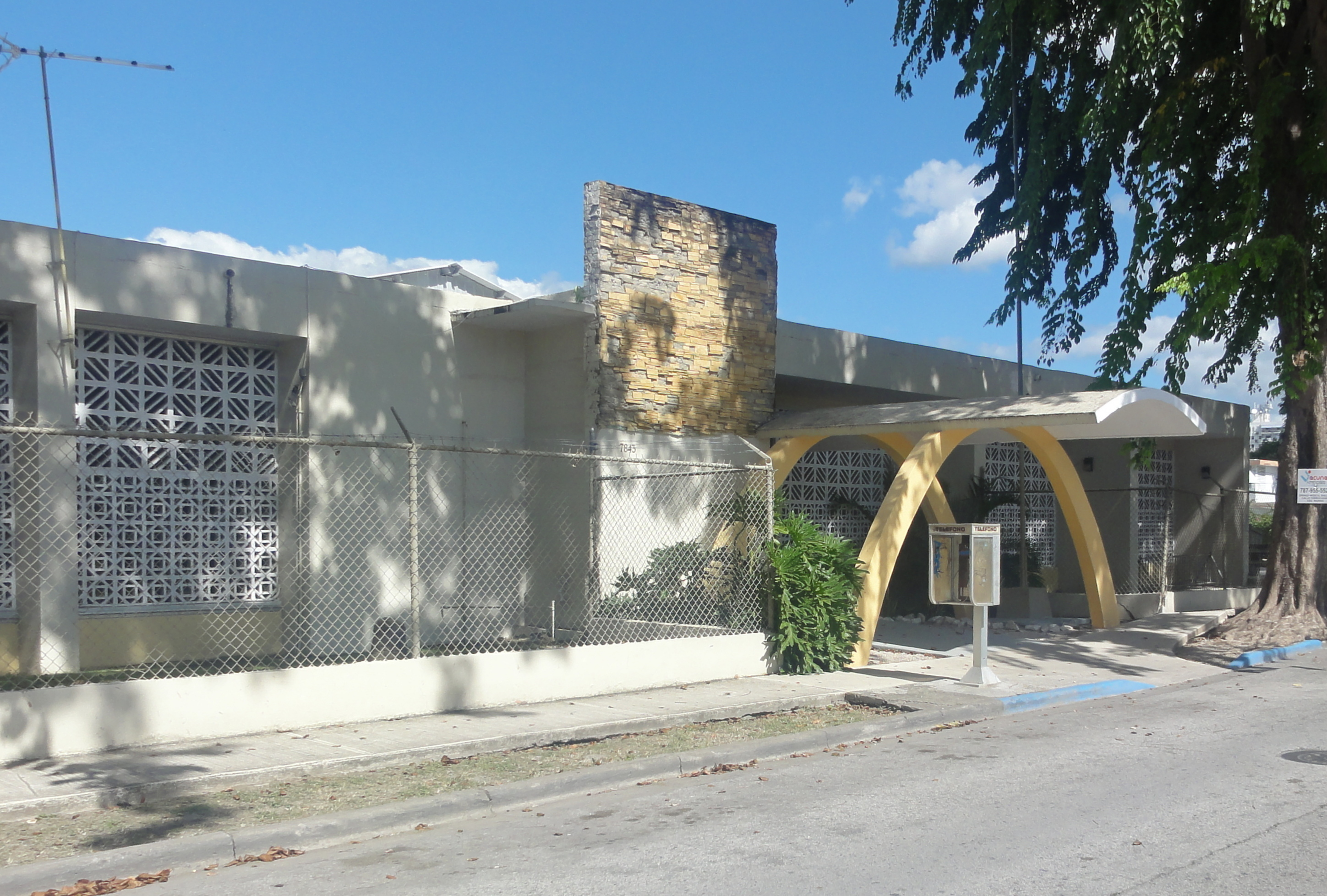
Ponce YMCA Building in Urbanización Santa María

== See also ==
- List of communities in Puerto Rico
