= Pastillo River =

River in Ponce, Puerto Rico

Río Pastillo Río Marueño
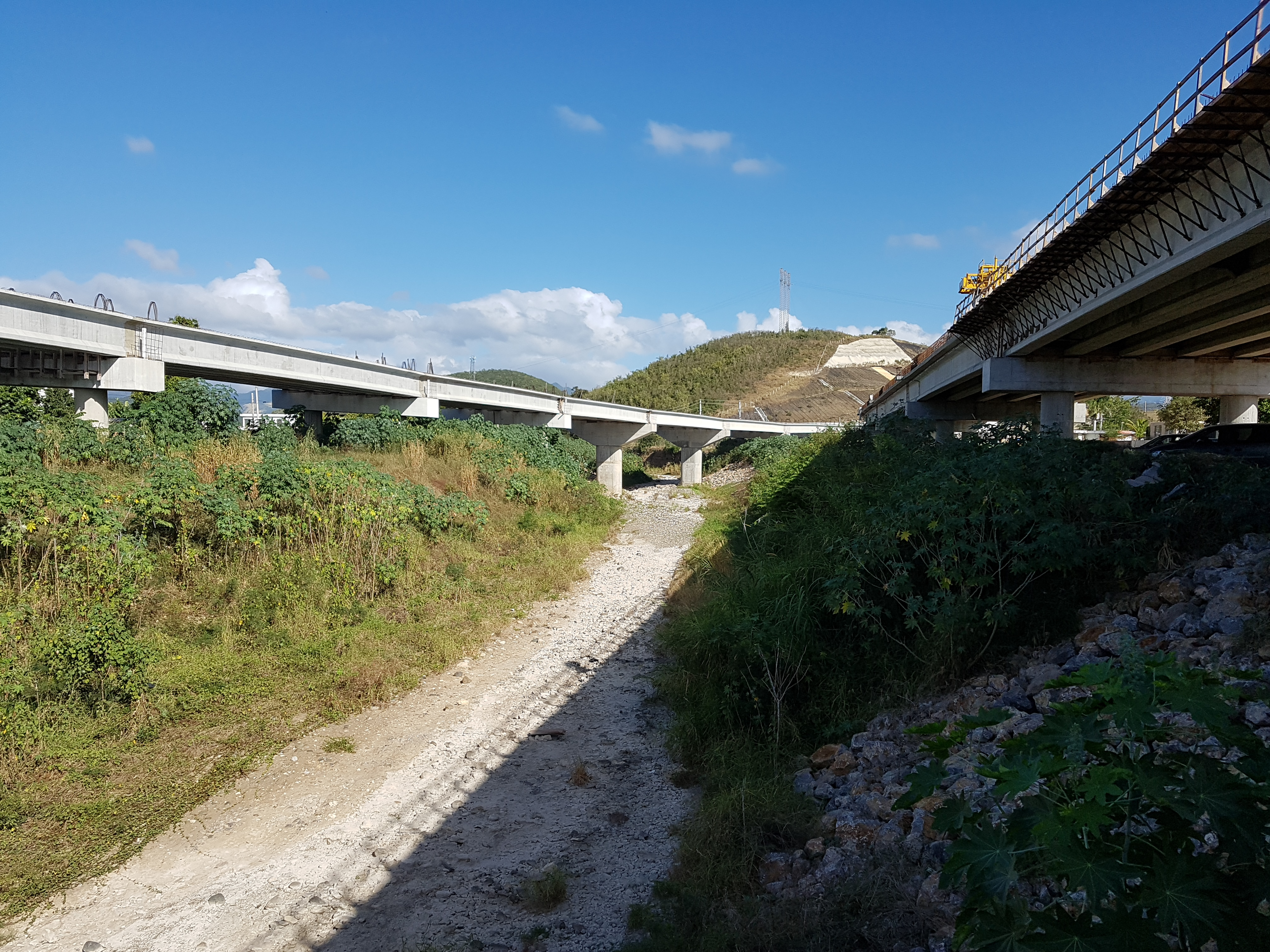
- Río Pastillo during the dry season in Barrio Canas

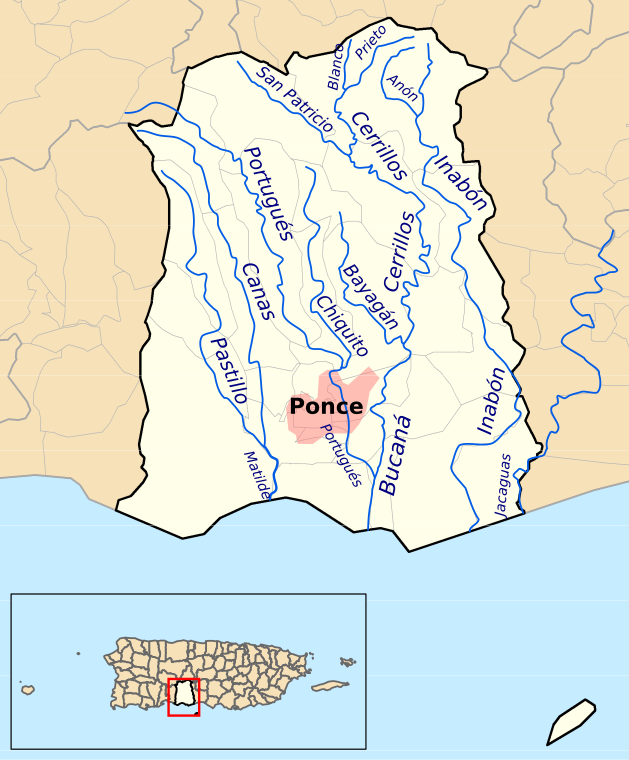
- Map showing the location of Río Pastillo among the other rivers in the municipality. The area in pink represents the urban zone of the city

- Location of mouth
- Etymology: Barrio Marueño

Location
- Country: United States
- Territory: Puerto Rico
- Municipality: Ponce

Physical characteristics
- Source
  - location: Barrio Guaraguao, Ponce
  - coordinates: 18.0019106°N 66.6404508°W
  - elevation: 435 feet (133 m)
- Mouth
  - location: Rio Matilde
  - elevation: 15 feet (4.6 m)
- Length: 19 kilometers (12 mi)

Basin features
- Progression: Marueño; Quebrada Limón; Canas; Canas Urbano
- River system: Río Matilde
- Tributaries
  - left: Quebrada Limon; Quebrada del Agua

Río Pastillo is a river in the municipality of Ponce, Puerto Rico. It is also known as Río Marueño in the area of the municipality where it runs through barrio Marueño. Together with Cañas River, Pastillo forms Matilde River. Pastillo is one of the 14 rivers in the municipality. The river originates at an altitude of 435 feet. Its tributaries are Quebrada Limon and Quebrada del Agua brooks and the river runs for 19 kilometers before feeding into Río Matilde at a height of 15 feet in Barrio Canas Urbano.

== Origin ==
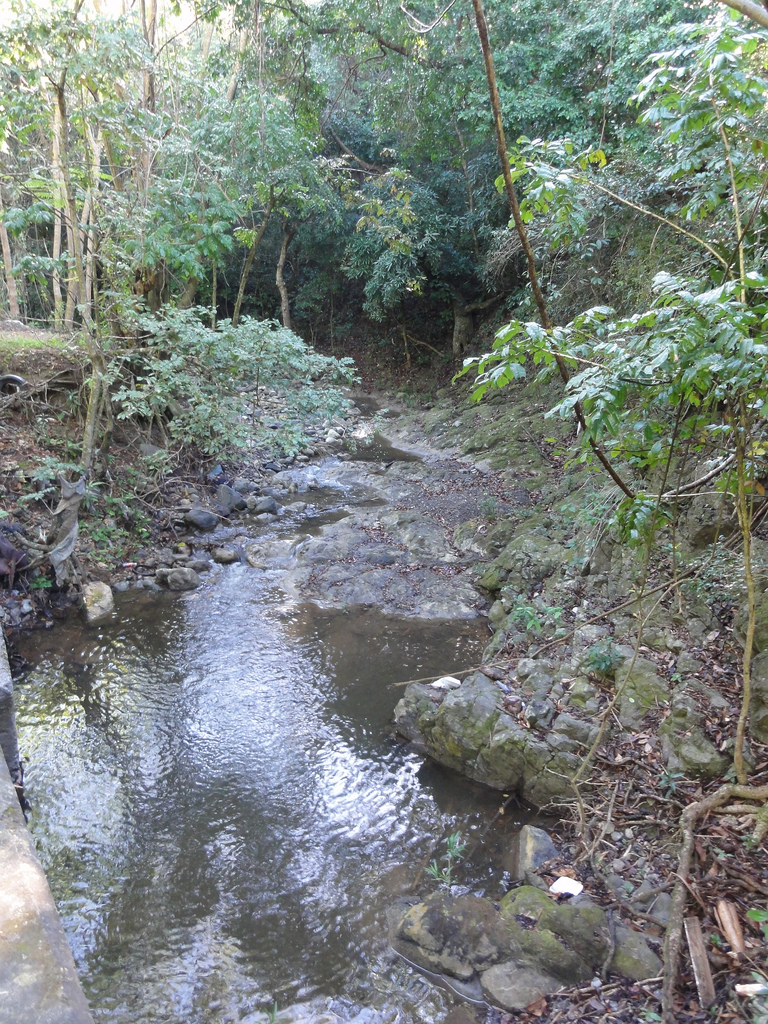
Río Pastillo near PR-501, km 4.6, in Barrio Marueño, Ponce, Puerto Rico

Río Pastillo (Note: Río Pastillo has sometimes been erroneously called Río Matilde. For example HERE (Informe Ecológico de Flora y Fauna, Proyecto Gasoducto del Sur: Peñuelas, Ponce, Juana Díaz, Santa Isabel, Salinas. For: Proyecto Gasoducto del Sur - Peñuelas, Ponce, Juana Díaz, Santa Isabel, Salinas. By: ENSR (Piscataway, NJ) - AEE (Autoridad de Energia Electrica). Retrieved 26 November 2013.) states "Río Matilde: ... Hacia el Norte desde su intersección con la Quebrada del Agua se le conoce como Río Pastillo." Translated and paraphrased: North of its intersection with Quebrada del Agua creek, Rio Matilde is known as Río Pastillo.) has its origin in the northern mountains of Ponce's Barrio Marueño, in an area called Yagrumo. This river runs for approximately 19 kilometers (12 mi) before reaching barrio Canas in the city of Ponce where it merges with Río Canas to form Matilde River. The Government of Puerto Rico has plans to canalize this river.

== Feeder streams ==
Quebrada Limón and Quebrada del Agua are two of the main feeder streams to Pastillo River. Quebrada del Agua was diverted via canalization to drain directly to the Caribbean Sea. In times of heavy rainfall, Quebrada del Agua was prone to overflow, as happened on 7 October 1985, when 16 people died due to its flooding.

== Course of the river ==
The following table summarizes the course of Rio Pastillo in terms of roads crossed. Roads are listed as the river flows from its origin in the mountains of Quebrada Limon, east of the city of Ponce, to its merging with Rio Canas to form Rio Matilde in Barrio Canas (N/A = Data not available):

No.	Barrio	Road	Road's km marker	NBI ID	Bridge name (if any)	Direction (of bridge traffic)	Coordinates	Notes
1	Marueño	PR-501	4.7	N/A	Unnamed	Both	18°4′12.7194″N 66°39′57.7434″W	0.1 km N of Camino La Tuna
2	Marueño	PR-501	4.3	N/A	Unnamed	Both	18°3′48.888″N 66°39′49.8234″W	0.1 km S of Camino Parcelas Viejas; 0.2 km S of INT PR-501 & PR 502
3	Quebrada Limon	PR-502	1.5	7701	Unnamed	Both	18°2′46.3554″N 66°39′49.968″W	0.1 km S of Camino Las Lisas
4	Canas	PR-132	21.5	2731	Unnamed	Both	18°2′4.4514″N 66°39′44.136″W	Immediately W of INT w/PR-502; next to Esc. Julia Cordero Negron, Bo. Quebrada Limón
5	Canas	North Main Street	not marked	21581	Unnamed	Both	18°0′45.144″N 66°38′53.9514″W	At entrance to Jardines del Caribe-3ra Seccion (South of PR 132, km 3.1); N Main St is in J. del Caribe, between Calle 18 and Calle 22
6	Canas Urbano	PR-500	1.0	23221	Unnamed	Both	18°0′23.508″N 66°38′37.7874″W	At where PR-163 and PR-500 become one same road

== See also ==
- List of rivers of Puerto Rico
- List of rivers of Ponce
