= Puerto Rico Highway 136 =

Highway in Puerto Rico

Highway 136
- Ruta 136
- Avenida Pedro Albizu Campos

Route information
- Maintained by Puerto Rico DTPW
- Length: 0.33 km (0.21 mi; 1,100 ft)

Major junctions
- South end: PR-127 in Guayanilla barrio-pueblo
- North end: PR-2 / PR-132 in Jaguas

Location
- Country: United States
- Territory: Puerto Rico
- Municipalities: Guayanilla

Highway system
- Roads in Puerto Rico; List
← PR-135	→ PR-137

Puerto Rico Highway 136 (PR-136) is a short road in Guayanilla, Puerto Rico. This highway extends from PR-127 to PR-132 near downtown Guayanilla.

== Route description ==
This road connects from PR-2 and PR-132 with PR-127 near downtown Guayanilla. There are long-term plans to expand the PR-136 to Punta Verraco, in the coast of the municipality, which has not yet materialized because it is a protected natural area.

== Major intersections ==
The entire route is located in Guayanilla.

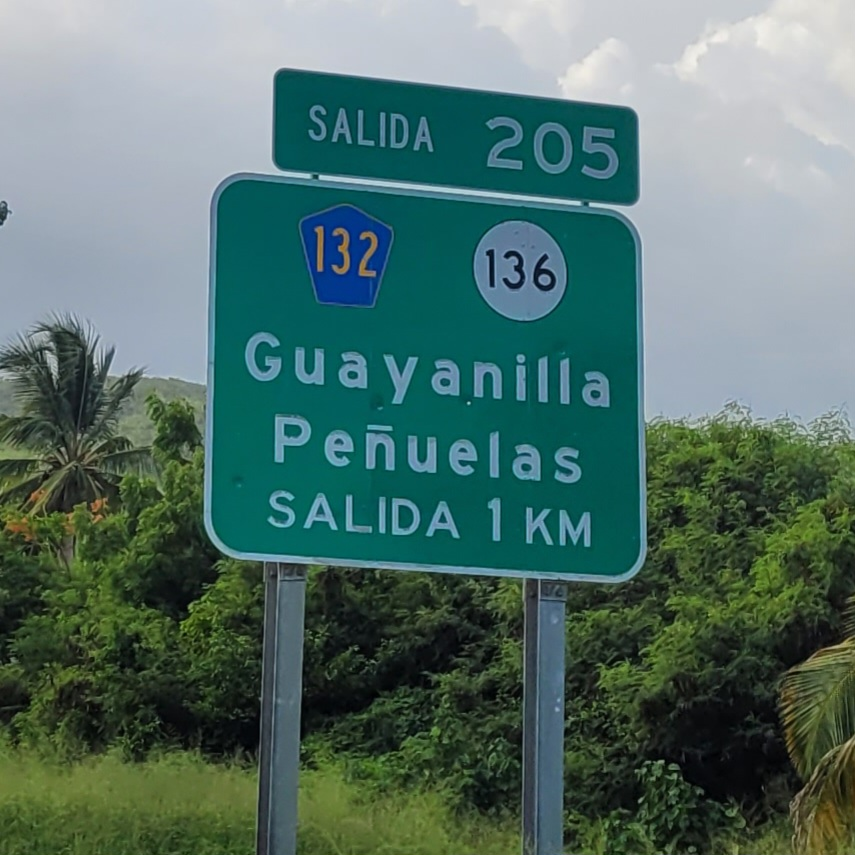
PR-2 west approaching exit 205 to PR-132 east and PR-136 south in Magas barrio

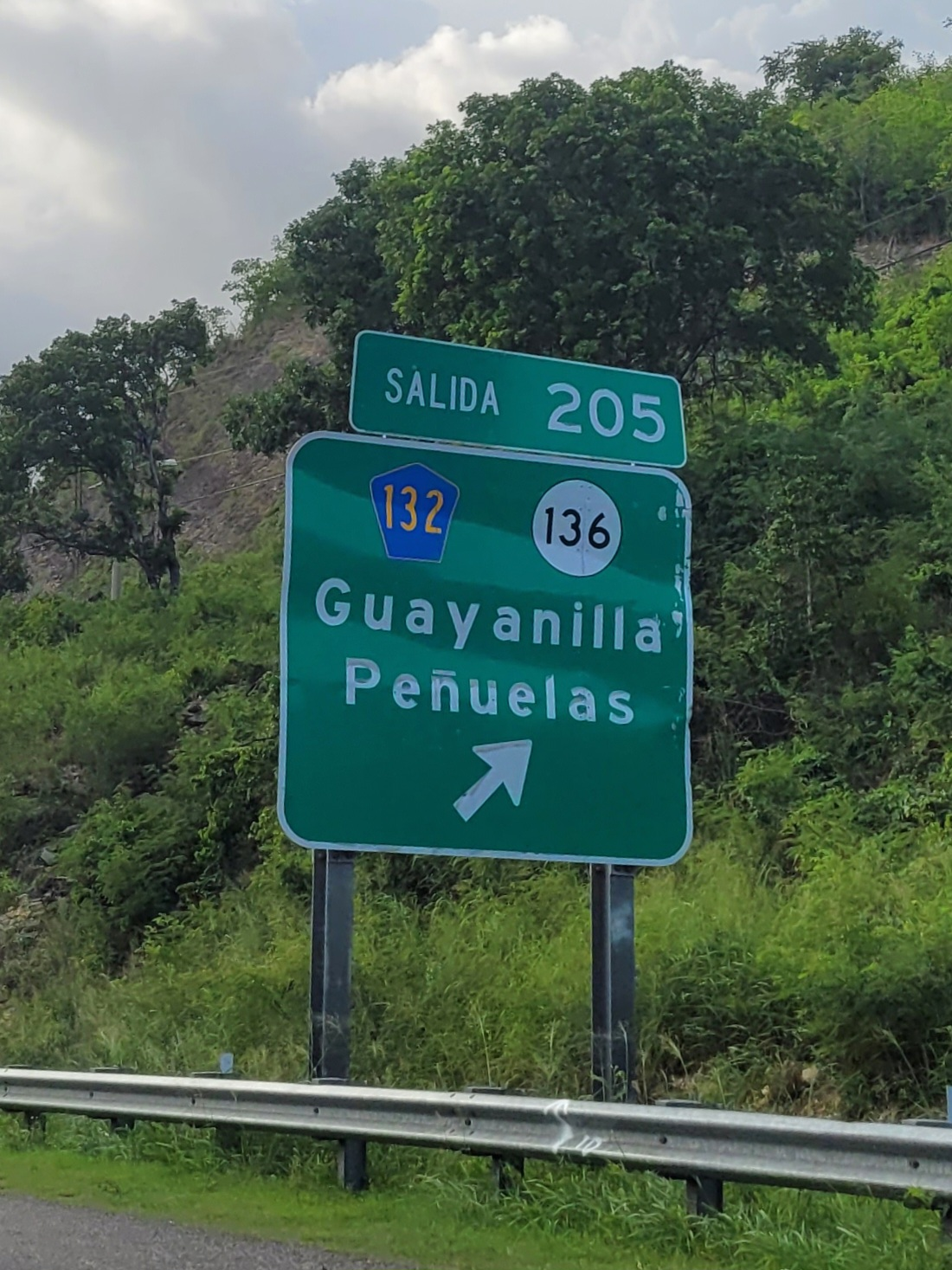
PR-2 west at exit 205 to PR-132 east and PR-136 south between Magas and Jaguas barrios

Location	km	mi	Destinations	Notes
Guayanilla barrio-pueblo	0.33	0.21	PR-127 (Calle Luis Muñoz Rivera) – Guayanilla, Yauco	Southern terminus of PR-136
Jaguas	0.00	0.00	PR-2 (Expreso Roberto Sánchez Vilella) – Ponce, Yauco	Northern terminus of PR-136 and western terminus of PR-132; PR-2 exit 205; diamond interchange
Jaguas	0.00	0.00	PR-132 east (Carretera Juan C. Torres Irizarry) – Peñuelas	Continuation beyond PR-2
1.000 mi = 1.609 km; 1.000 km = 0.621 mi

== See also ==
- Pedro Albizu Campos
