= Playa =

Playa or playas may refer to:

== Landforms ==
- Dry lake, often called a playa in the southwestern United States
- Endorheic basin, a basin with no outlet
- Salt flat

== Places ==
=== Cuba ===
- Playa, Havana

=== Ecuador ===
- Playas Canton
  - Playas, Ecuador, its administrative center

=== Mexico ===
- Playa del Carmen, Quintana Roo

=== United States ===
- Black Rock Desert, Nevada
- Playas, New Mexico, an unincorporated community
- Playa, Añasco, Puerto Rico
- Playa, Guayanilla, Puerto Rico
- Playa, Ponce, Puerto Rico
- Playa, Santa Isabel, Puerto Rico
- Playa, Yabucoa, Puerto Rico

== Music ==
- Playa (band), an American R&B trio
- "Playa" (A Boogie wit da Hoodie song), 2022
- "Playa" (ASAP Rocky song), 2026

== Other uses ==
- Playa (Chilean law), a seashore area and lakeshore area in Chilean law
- Playa, the protagonist of the Saints Row series

== See also ==
- La Playa (disambiguation)
- Playa Azul (disambiguation)
- Playa Grande (disambiguation)
