= Puerto Rico Highway 127 =

Highway in Puerto Rico

Highway 127
- Ruta 127

Route information
- Maintained by Puerto Rico DTPW
- Length: 17.7 km (11.0 mi)

Major junctions
- West end: PR-121 / PR-128 in Susúa Baja
- PR-3372 in Yauco barrio-pueblo; PR-335 in Yauco barrio-pueblo; PR-359 in Jácanas; PR-377 in Quebradas; PR-136 in Guayanilla barrio-pueblo; PR-335 in Guayanilla barrio-pueblo; PR-2 in Magas; PR-336 / PR-3336 in Magas–Playa; PR-384 in Tallaboa Poniente; PR-385 in Encarnación–Tallaboa Poniente
- East end: PR-2 in Encarnación

Location
- Country: United States
- Territory: Puerto Rico
- Municipalities: Yauco, Guayanilla, Peñuelas

Highway system
- Roads in Puerto Rico; List
| ← PR-125 | → PR-128 |

Puerto Rico Highway 127 (PR-127) is a road that travels from Yauco, Puerto Rico to Peñuelas. This highway begins at its intersection with PR-121 and PR-128 in Susúa Baja and ends at its junction with PR-2 in Encarnación, passing through downtown Guayanilla.

== Major intersections ==
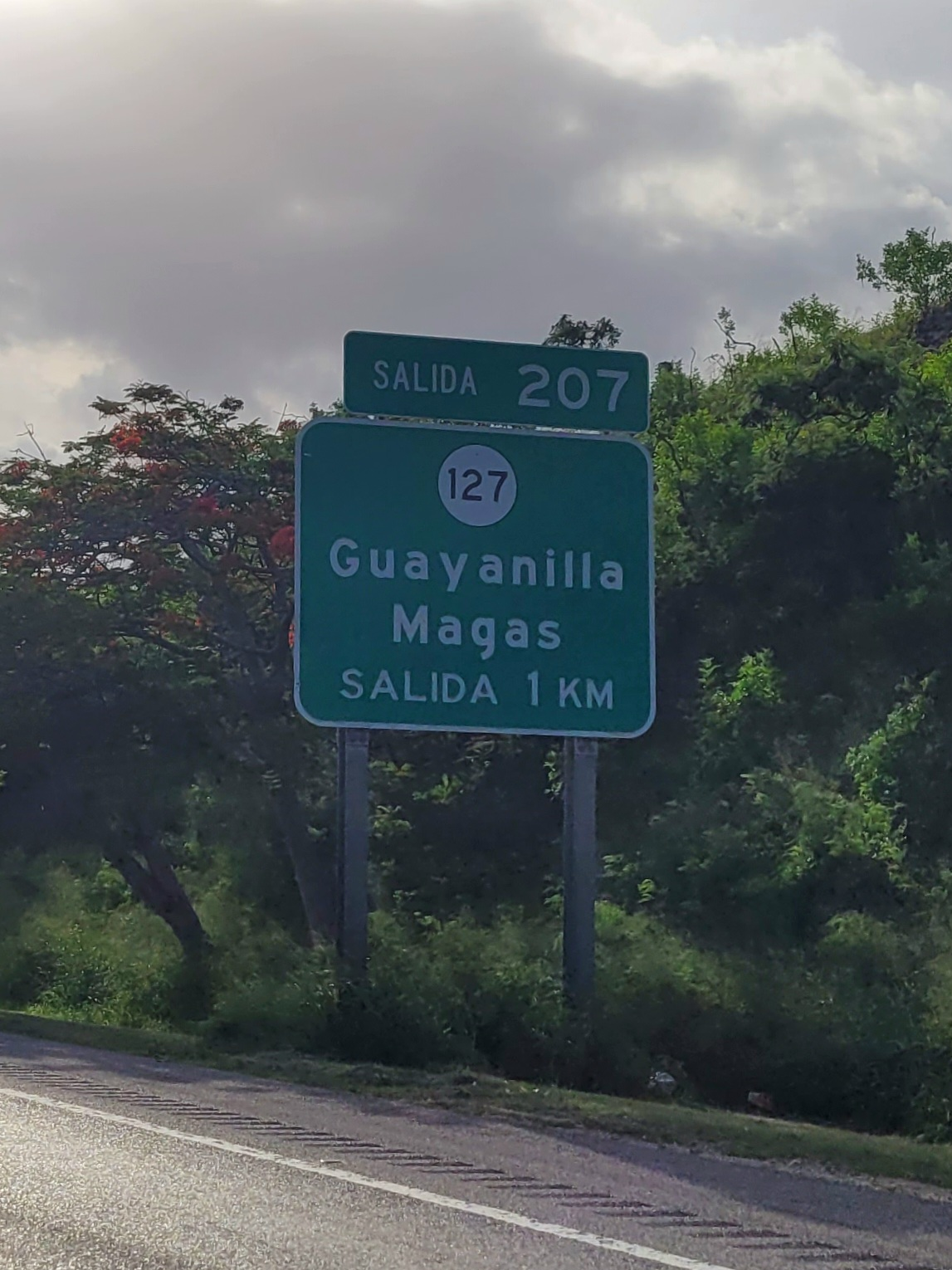
PR-2 west approaching exit 207 to PR-127 in Magas, Guayanilla

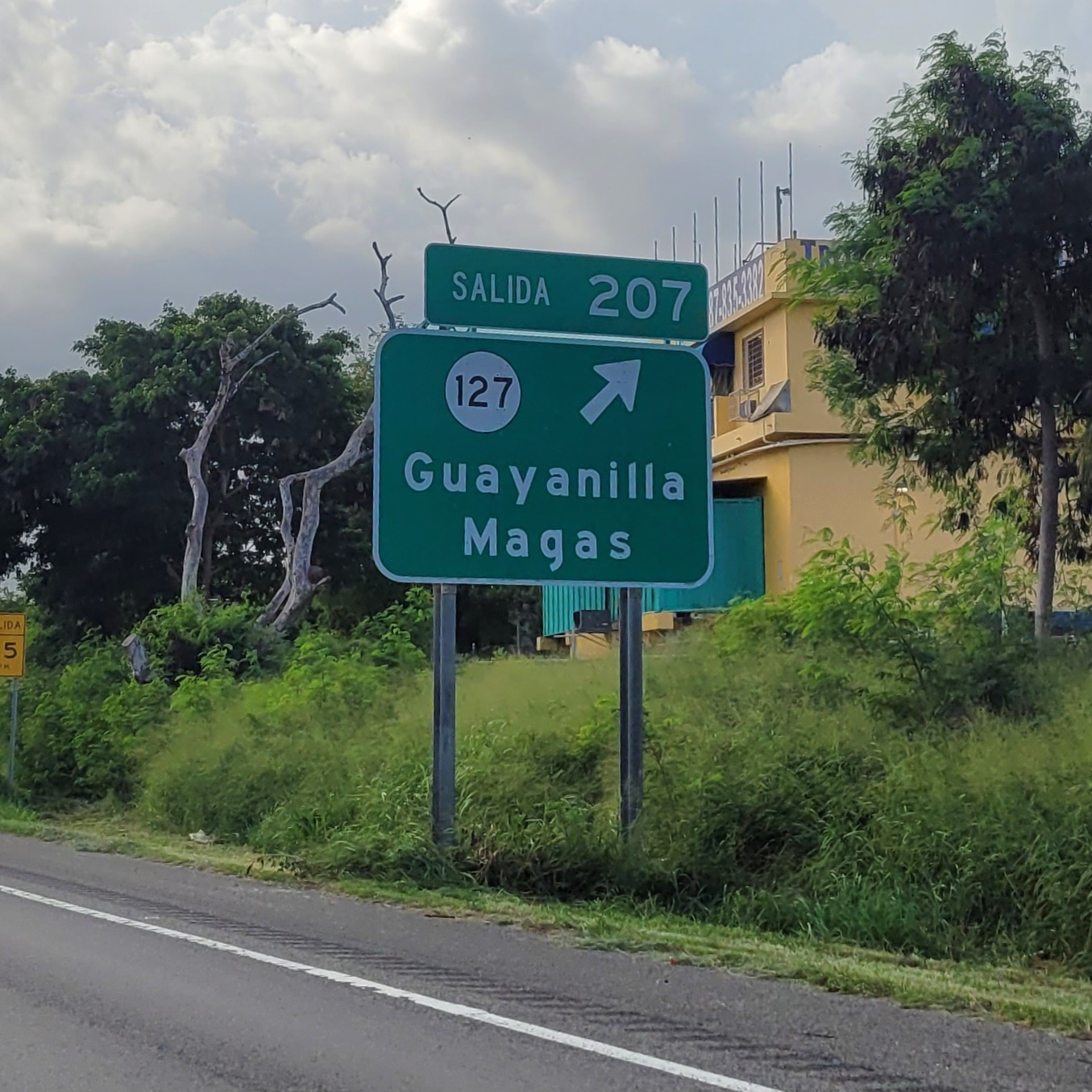
PR-2 west at exit 207 to PR-127 near Guayanilla barrio-pueblo

| Municipality | Location | km | mi | Destinations | Notes |
|---|---|---|---|---|---|
| Yauco | Susúa Baja | 0.0 | 0.0 | PR-121 – Sabana Grande | Continuation beyond PR-128 |
| Yauco | Susúa Baja | 0.0 | 0.0 | PR-128 (Avenida Pedro Albizu Campos) – Ponce, Lares | Western terminus of PR-127 and eastern terminus of PR-121 |
| Yauco | Yauco barrio-pueblo | 1.0– 1.1 | 0.62– 0.68 | PR-3372 (Calle Ramón Emeterio Betances) – Yauco | One-way street |
| Yauco | Yauco barrio-pueblo | 1.1– 1.2 | 0.68– 0.75 | PR-335 (Calle Santo Domingo) – Barina | |
| Yauco | Río Yauco | 1.2 | 0.75 | Puente Cristóbal Colón | |
| Yauco | Jácanas | 1.7 | 1.1 | PR-359 (Carretera General Mihiel Gilormini Pacheco) to PR-2 (Expreso Roberto Sánchez Vilella) – Ponce, Mayagüez, Jácanas | PR-2 exit 200 |
| Guayanilla | Quebradas | 4.1 | 2.5 | PR-398 – Quebradas | |
| Guayanilla | Quebradas | 6.3 | 3.9 | PR-377 – Consejo | |
| Guayanilla | Guayanilla barrio-pueblo | 7.1 | 4.4 | PR-136 (Avenida Pedro Albizu Campos) to PR-2 (Expreso Roberto Sánchez Vilella) / PR-132 (Carretera Juan C. Torres Irizarry) – Ponce, Mayagüez, Peñuelas | PR-2 exit 205 |
| Guayanilla | Guayanilla barrio-pueblo | 8.4 | 5.2 | PR-335 – Indios | |
| Guayanilla | Guayanilla barrio-pueblo | 8.6 | 5.3 | PR-3336 (Calle José de Diego) – Playa | |
| Guayanilla | Magas | 9.7 | 6.0 | PR-2 (Expreso Roberto Sánchez Vilella) – Ponce, Mayagüez | PR-2 exit 207; diamond interchange |
| Guayanilla | Magas | 10.6 | 6.6 | PR-383 – Magas | |
| Guayanilla | Magas–Playa line | 11.3 | 7.0 | PR-336 / PR-3336 – Guayanilla, Playa | |
| Peñuelas | Tallaboa Poniente | 15.3 | 9.5 | PR-337 – Tallaboa Poniente | |
| Peñuelas | Tallaboa Poniente | 15.8 | 9.8 | PR-384 – Tallaboa Poniente | |
| Peñuelas | Encarnación–Tallaboa Poniente line | 16.7– 16.8 | 10.4– 10.4 | PR-385 (Desvío Ángel Miguel Candelario Arce) to PR-2 (Expreso Roberto Sánchez Vilella) – Peñuelas, Ponce, Mayagüez | PR-2 exit 213 |
| Peñuelas | Encarnación | 17.7 | 11.0 | PR-2 (Expreso Roberto Sánchez Vilella) – Ponce, Mayagüez | Eastern terminus of PR-127; PR-2 exit 214; partial cloverleaf interchange |
1.000 mi = 1.609 km; 1.000 km = 0.621 mi
