= 2019–20 Puerto Rico earthquakes =

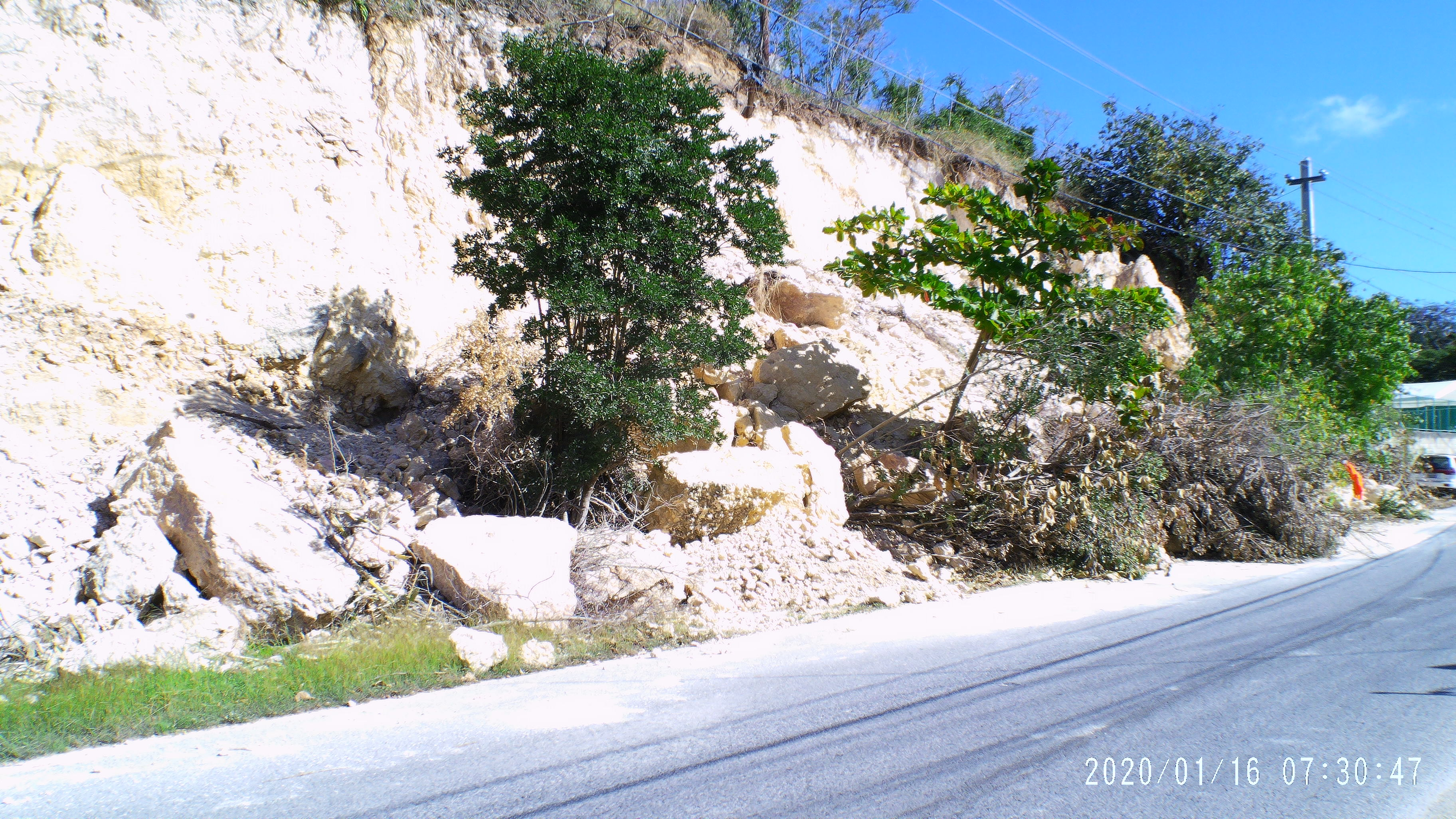
- Landslide triggered by the M6.4 earthquake in Ponce, Puerto Rico

- Location within Puerto Rico
- UTC time: 2020-01-07 08:24:26
- ISC event: 617125982
- USGS-ANSS: ComCat
- Local date: January 7, 2020
- Local time: 04:24 AST
- Magnitude: 6.4 M_{w}
- Depth: 6 km (4 mi)
- Epicenter: 17.916°N 66.813°W
- Fault: Punta Montalva
- Type: Oblique-slip normal
- Total damage: $3.1 billion USD
- Max. intensity: MMI VIII (Severe)
- Peak acceleration: 0.52 g
- Peak velocity: 24.45 cm/s
- Aftershocks: 7,600~ (M≥2.5, as of January 7, 2022)
- Casualties: 4 dead, 9 injured

Starting on December 28, 2019, and progressing into 2020, the southwestern part of the island of Puerto Rico was struck by an earthquake swarm, including 11 that were of magnitude 5 or greater. The largest and most damaging of this sequence was a magnitude 6.4 M_{w}, which occurred on January 7 at 04:24 AST (08:24 UTC), with a maximum felt intensity of VIII (Severe) on the Modified Mercalli intensity scale. At least one person was killed, and several others were injured. A 5.8 M_{w}earthquake the previous day caused the destruction of a natural arch, a tourist attraction at Punta Ventana in Guayanilla. A 5.9 M_{w}aftershock on Saturday, January 11, damaged many structures, including several historical buildings as well as modern high-rises in the city of Ponce.

Power was lost island-wide immediately after the quake and was increasingly restored over a period of a week. Damage to homes was extensive and, by January 14, more than 8,000 people were homeless and camping outdoors in various types of shelters, with 40,000 others camping outside their homes, just in the city of Ponce alone. There were refugees in 28 government-sponsored refugee centers spread over 14 municipalities of southern and central Puerto Rico. Damage to government structures was calculated in the hundreds of millions and financial losses were estimated in $3.1 billion. A power plant that supplied over a quarter of Puerto Rico's energy needs was badly damaged and was shut down, with repairs estimated to take at least a year.

The day of the mainshock, January 7, Puerto Rico governor Wanda Vázquez Garced declared a state of emergency and activated the Puerto Rico National Guard and the Puerto Rico State Guard. That same day, she also made available $130 million in aid to the municipalities affected. The White House also approved $5 million in federal emergency relief. On January 12, the day after the January 11, 5.9 aftershock, the governor distributed $12 million to six municipalities most affected by the quake. Tent cities were set up in five of the hardest-hit towns with space for some 3,200 refugees.

== Tectonic setting ==
Puerto Rico lies at the highly oblique convergent boundary between the Caribbean plate and the North American plate. A separate Puerto Rico–Virgin Islands microplate has been identified based on GPS observations. To the north the North American plate is being subducted beneath this microplate along the Puerto Rico Trench. To the south of Puerto Rico the microplate is being thrust southwards over the Caribbean plate along the Muertos Thrust system. On the upper slope and shelf the current style of faulting is extensional with a series of WSW-ENE trending normal faults, such as the Ponce Fault and the Bajo Tasmanian Fault. Several faults are also known to cross parts of the main island.

== Earthquake sequence ==
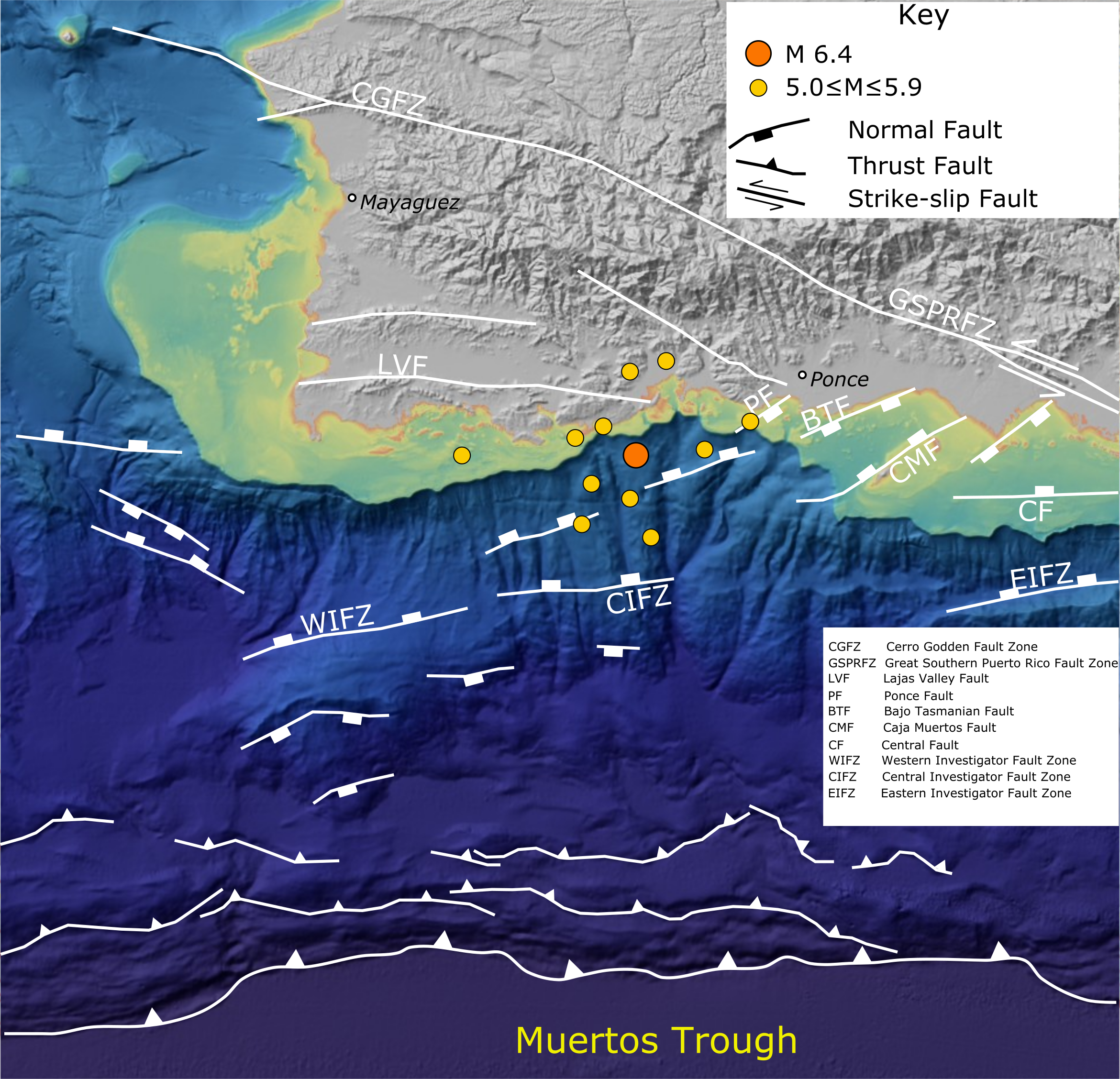
Map showing epicenters of M≥5 earthquakes up to February 4, 2020, and active faults on base of a NOAA DEM

The sequence began on December 28, 2019, with a M_{w}4.7 earthquake, followed closely by a M_{w}5.0 event in the early hours of December 29. Several earthquakes of M <5 occurred over the next few days, followed by a M_{w}5.8 event at 10:32 UTC on January 6. The largest event, a M_{w}6.4, occurred the next morning, followed by a M_{w}5.6 event within 10 minutes and a M_{w}5.0 about 15 minutes after that. The M_{w}6.4 event had a focal mechanism consistent with normal faulting on a fault trending WSW-ENE. A M_{w}5.9 event was then logged on January 11 at 12:54 UTC. In the first month of the sequence there were a total of 11 M ≥5 earthquakes and a further 82 in the range M 4–4.9. A M_{w}5.4 earthquake occurred on May 2 at 11:13 UTC in the same area as the M 6.4 event and with a similar focal mechanism. As of May 2, after a further two M>4 shocks in the same area, the total number of earthquakes in the sequence of M>3 exceeded 1,000 and there had been 95 of M>4.

Sequence of notable earthquakes
Date	UTC	Mw	MMI	Depth (km)	Ref.	Epicenter
December 29	01:06:00	5.0	V	6.0		Guánica, offshore
January 6	10:32:18	5.8	VI	6.0		Guayanilla, offshore
January 7	08:24:27	6.4	VIII	6.0		Guayanilla, offshore
January 7	08:29:49	5.0	IV	10.0		Peñuelas, offshore
January 7	08:34:01	5.6	V	10.0		Peñuelas, offshore
January 7	08:50:45	5.0	V	10.0		Ponce, offshore
January 7	11:18:43	5.6	VI	9.0		Magas, Guayanilla
January 10	22:26:25	5.2	VI	9.0		Guánica, offshore
January 11	12:54:45	5.9	VII	5.0		Guayanilla, offshore
January 11	12:56:22	5.2	VI	10.0		Guayanilla, offshore
January 15	15:36:23	5.2	V	5.0		Lajas, offshore
January 25	20:20:38	5.0	V	13.0		Indios, Guayanilla
February 4	14:45:55	5.0	V	7.0		Guánica, offshore
May 2	11:13:18	5.4	VII	9.0		Peñuelas, offshore
July 3	20:49:45	5.3	VI	3.0		Lajas, offshore
United States Geological Survey

== Response ==
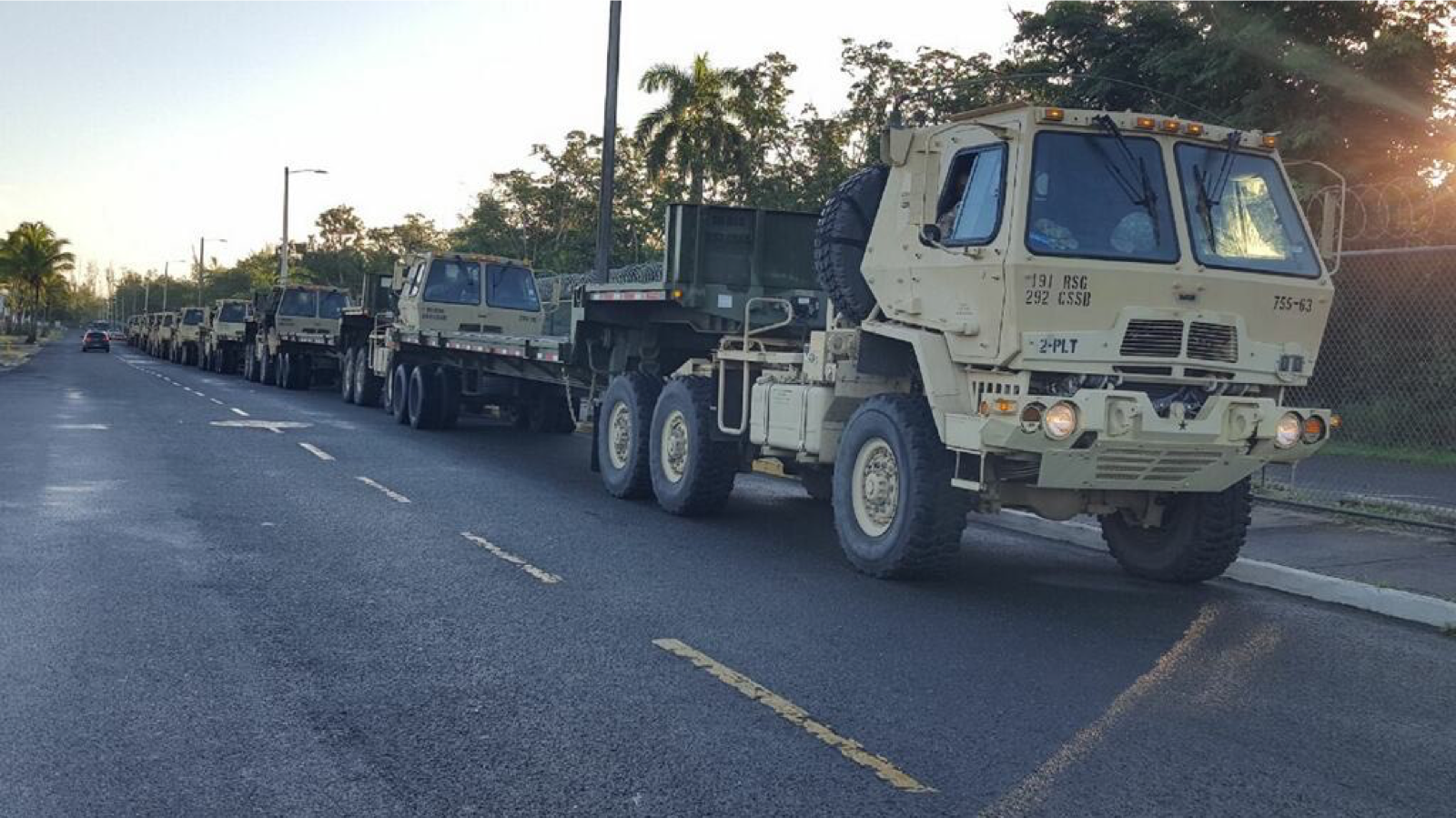
Puerto Rico National Guard soldiers from the 191st Regional Support Group and airmen from the 156th Wing offload and transport the Ohio National Guard's Disaster Relief Bed-down System for use by service members supporting earthquake recovery operations in Puerto Rico.

Puerto Rico governor Wanda Vázquez Garced declared a state of emergency on January 7 and mobilized the Puerto Rico National Guard. On January 8, the day after the main quake, the Ponce municipal government registered 1,111 residents in city shelters, "not including hundreds more" who drove to government-designated meeting sites, such as Estadio Paquito Montaner, to sleep in their cars. The parking lot at Auditorio Juan Pachin Vicens was also used as a meeting site. The Bernardino Cordero Bernard Vocational High School was also used as a shelter. The night after the quake, it was estimated that over 40,000 Ponce residents chose to sleep in their cars instead of their homes out of fear of more quakes. By January 13 the number of refugees was estimated at 3,000 Island-wide, but the municipal officials of some local governments believed that figure was probably about right for refugees in just their own single municipalities. Another estimate out the number of refugees at 5,000.

On January 7, the Puerto Rican government made available $130 million in aid. Late January 7, FEMA confirmed that US president Donald Trump had issued a (non-disaster) emergency declaration with a $5 million cap. The $5 million emergency declaration monies were to be spent on emergency services only. On January 12, 2020, Puerto Rico governor Wanda Vázquez Garced made a disbursement of $2 million to each of six municipalities most affected by the quake; the money came from the Puerto Rico State Emergency Reserve Fund. The government set up a central command center, where all pertinent state and municipal dependencies supporting the relief effort were to set up base and coordinate activities at the Polideportivo Frankie Colon in Urbanización Los Caobos, Barrio Bucaná, Ponce. It also became a collection center for items for the earthquake homeless.

By January 14, over 600 soldiers of the Puerto Rico National Guard had set up five tent cities for the homeless, with at least some tents outfitted with air conditioning for the bed-ridden and the elderly, in the municipalities of Guánica, Yauco, Guayanilla, Peñuelas and Ponce, with facilities for over 3,200 refugees.

== Effects ==
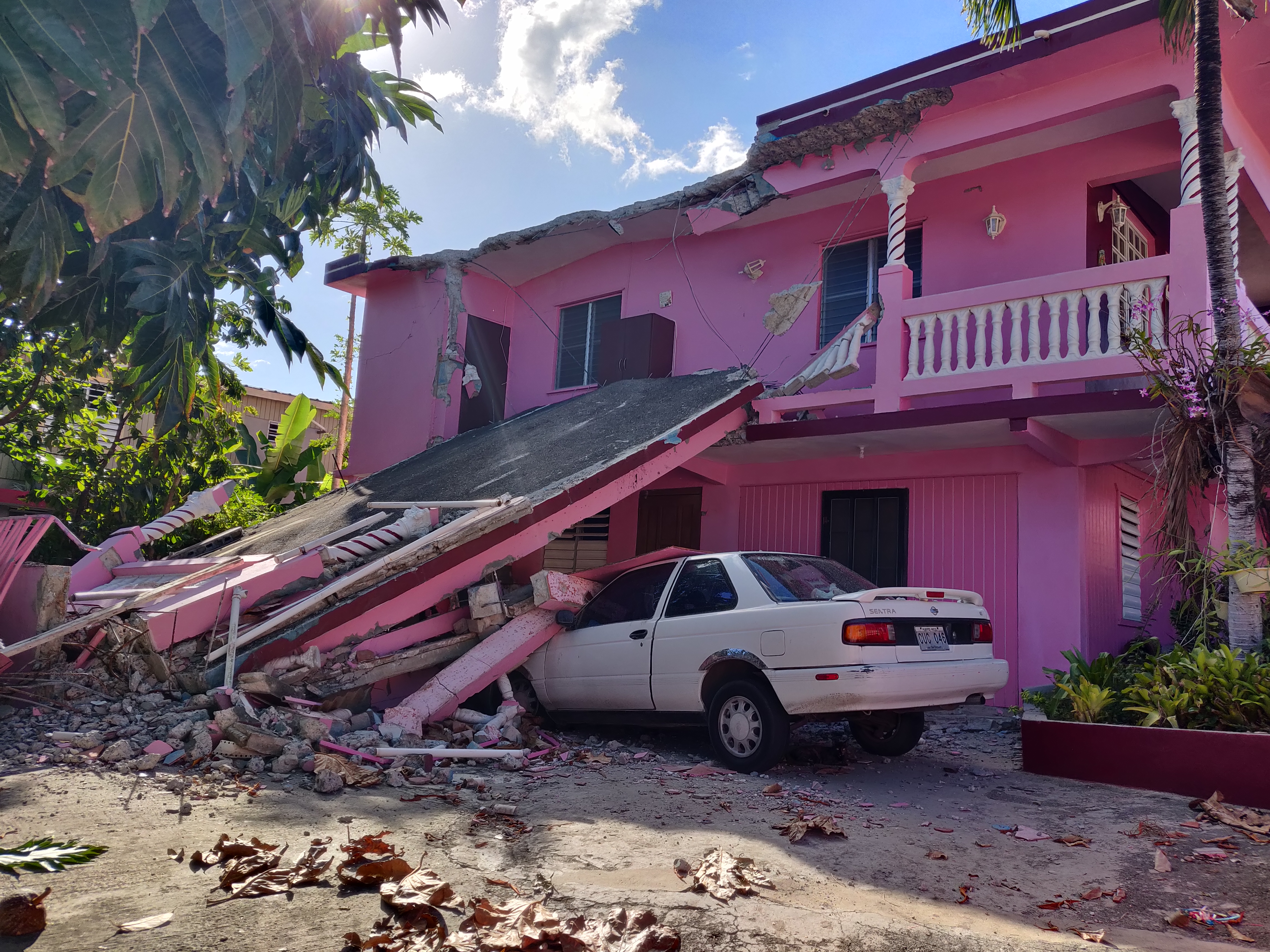
Collapsed house in Yauco.

=== Human losses ===
A male resident of Urbanización Jardines del Caribe, in the city of Ponce, lost his life as a direct result of the January 7 quake; additionally, eight other people in the area were injured. A woman died of a heart attack in the town of Guayanilla, after a 4.36-magnitude overnight aftershock occurred, on the night of January 9 into January 10. By January 10, two additional people had died of different medical conditions, attributed to the effects of the earthquakes.

=== Homeless ===
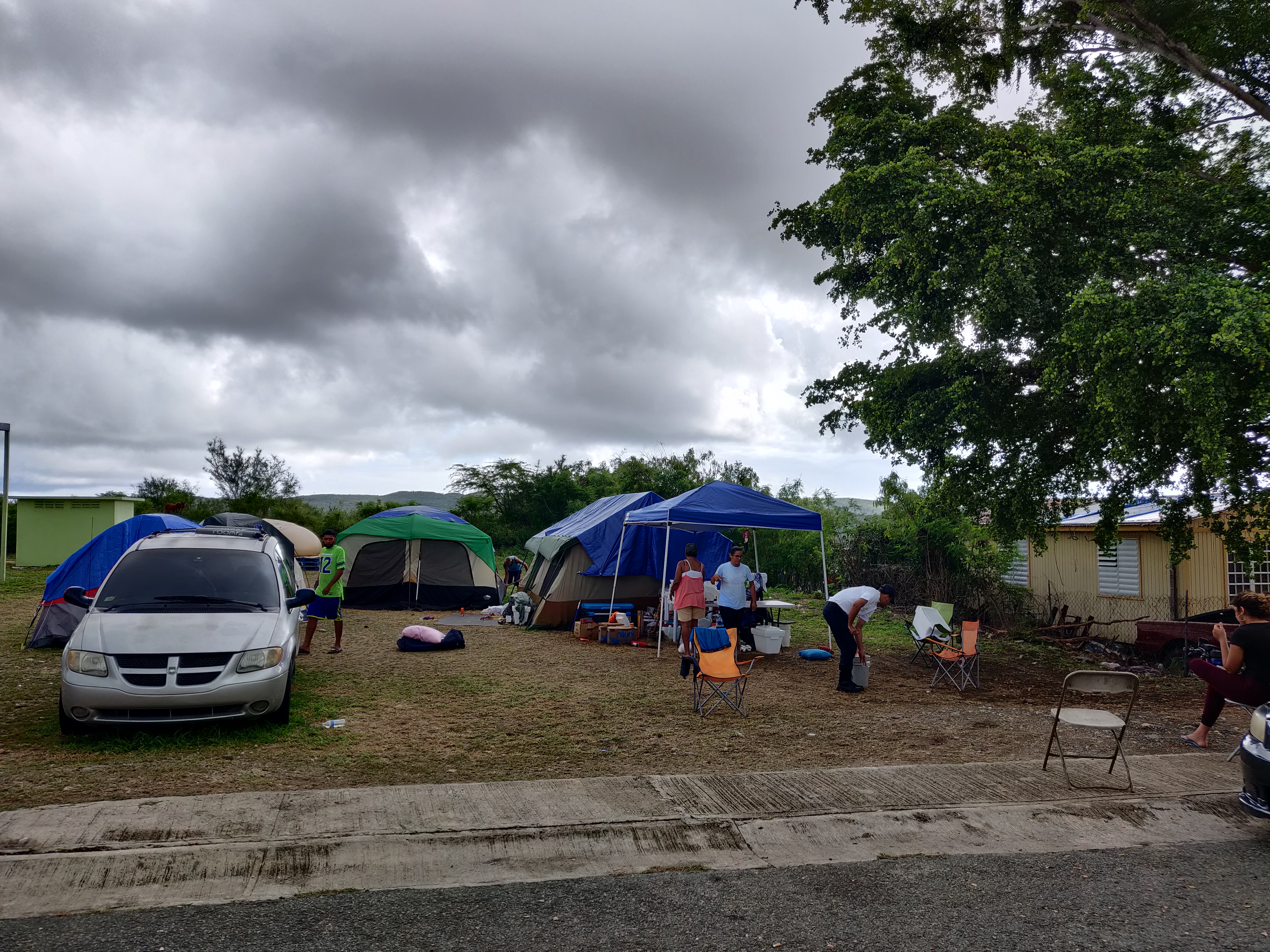
One of many impromptu "refugee camps" set up by displaced families in Guánica, one of the towns worst-hit by the earthquakes.

There were refugees in 28 government-sponsored refugee centers in the southern and central Puerto Rico municipalities of Yauco, Guánica, Ponce, Peñuelas, Guayanilla, Utuado, Maricao, Juana Díaz, Adjuntas, Sabana Grande, San Germán, Lajas, Jayuya and Mayagüez. The quakes also caused 28 families in Lares to lose their homes. At least three residential high-rise buildings in Ponce were rendered unusable, leaving the residents homeless.

On January 13, it was reported that some 3,000 homes had been destroyed or significantly damaged. By January 14, the number of homeless region-wide had climbed to 8,000. A January 15, 2020, register of homes rendered uninhabitable listed at least 789 properties. The number of homes with some level of damage was, however, significantly higher. For example, according to its mayor, in the municipality of Yauco alone, there were 3,200 homes with some degree of damage.

Numerous authorities pointed to the emotional toll on the people, particularly on entire families who had been left homeless.

=== Physical damage ===
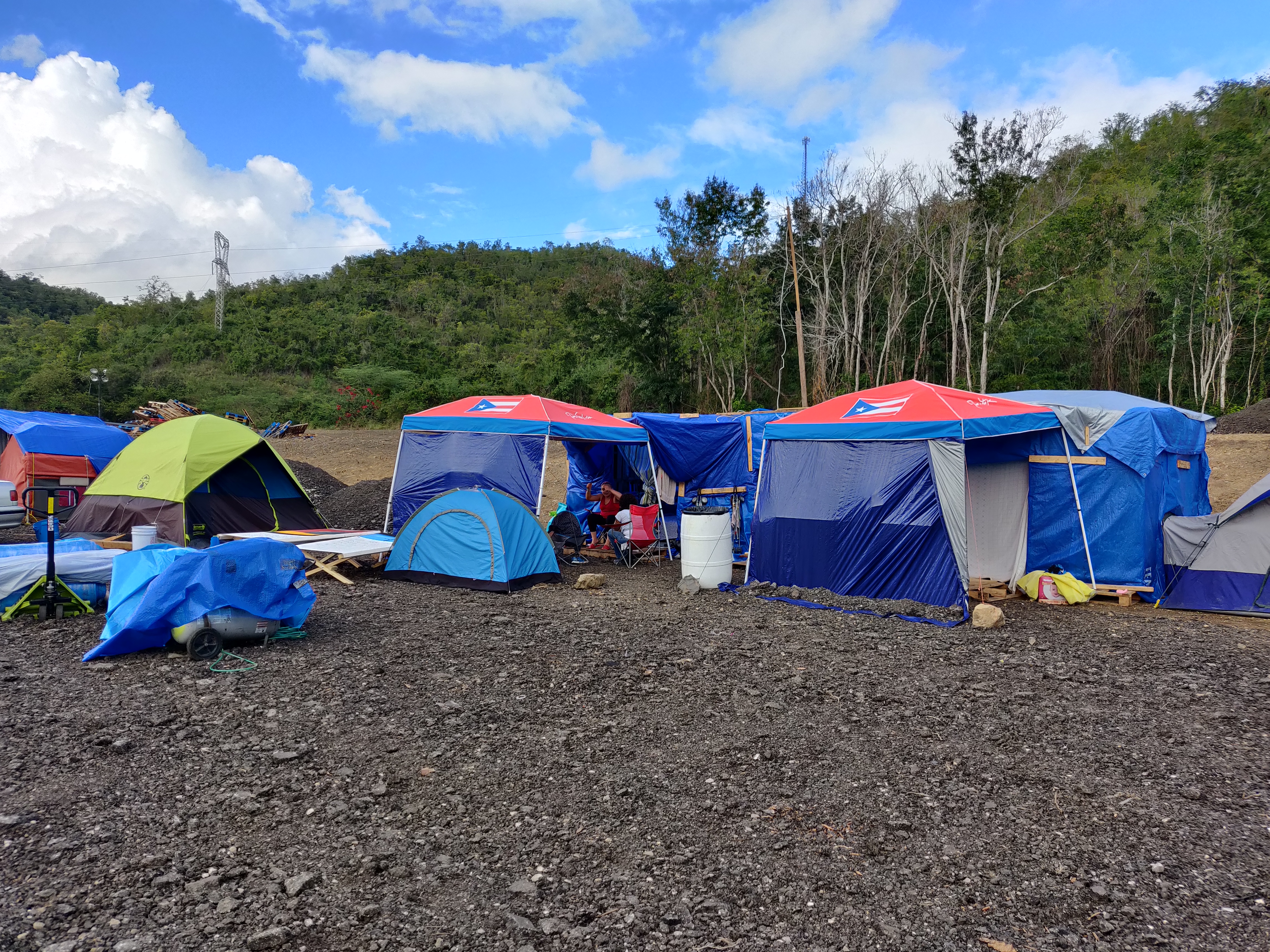
Camp improvised by families in Bo. Tibes displaced by the earthquakes

The January 7 quake destroyed numerous structures, including the Agripina Seda Elementary School in Guánica and the Inmaculada Concepción Church in Guayanilla. Also severely damaged by January 7 quake were the La Guancha Recreational and Cultural Complex, which was made inoperable and where 24 establishments had to shut down their operations, and Auditorio Juan Pachín Vicéns. The Moscoso Building of the Ponce City Hall was also damaged.

In Ponce both historic and modern buildings were damaged. Among these were Catedral de Nuestra Señora de Guadalupe, Museo de la Masacre, Iglesia Evangélica (northwest corner of C. Unión and C. Vives); La Gloria store on Paseo Atocha, Hotel Ponce Plaza, Condominium Ponciana on C. Marina, and Darlington Building, also on C. Marina. The damage forced the closing of several downtown streets. There was also damage to Logia Aurora, also on C. Marina. Guanica and Yauco were particularly impacted. The Guanica lighthouse was among the highly damaged buildings in there.

Additional damage throughout Puerto Rico included the Arecibo Observatory, which had already been damaged by Hurricane Maria in 2017. Of high concern was the structural damage suffered by school buildings throughout the island. For example, the José Julián Acosta Theater Arts School in San Juan was deemed partially unusable due to structural safety concerns, with classes being moved to the nearby Carnegie Library temporarily.

The January 11 aftershock inflicted further damage. Among the structures damaged by this aftershock were the Ponce Servicios municipal government building, Museo de la Masacre de Ponce, Residencia Armstrong-Poventud, and Casa Vives. On January 11, Ponce alone had sustained an estimated $150 million in damage. By January 14, 2020, the vice-mayor of Ponce estimated the cost of the damage so far, one of the most severely hit municipalities, at $1 billion. Financial losses were calculated at US$3.1 billion.

The May 2 M 5.5 earthquake caused further damage to buildings in Ponce. Some power outages were also reported.

=== Public infrastructure ===
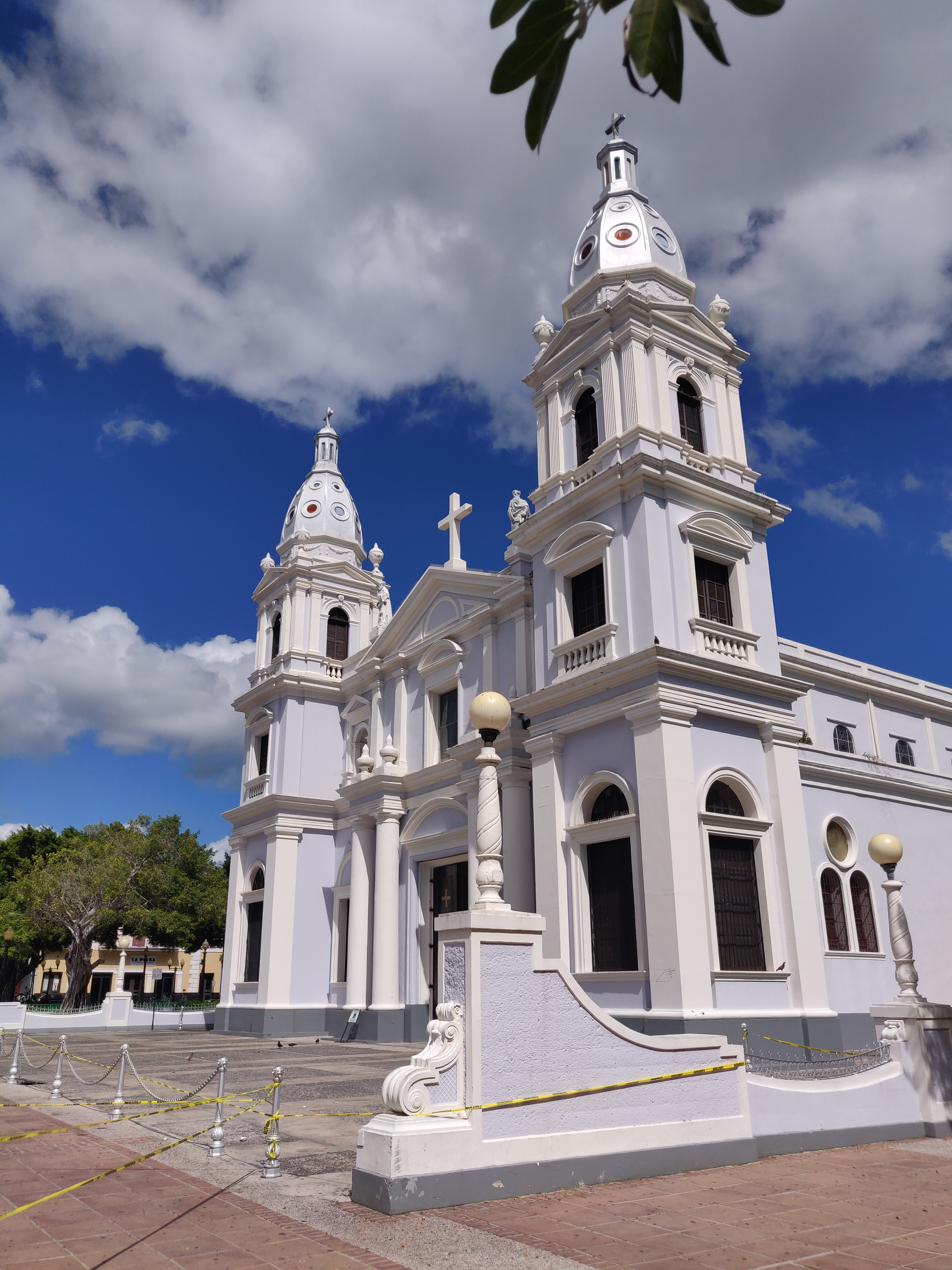
An urn fell off (top right corner of the right tower) from one of the towers of the Ponce Cathedral due to quake activity

There was no electricity in Ponce and in most of Puerto Rico on Tuesday, January 7, the day of the 4:24 am earthquake. "More than 250,000" residents island-wide were left without water and another half a million had no power. There were also rock and landslides. Among damage to infrastructure, the 5.9 aftershock quake the morning of January 11 created a crack in a bridge, and was expected to delay restoration of power. The Costa Sur Power Plant, which provides a quarter of the island's power, had sustained "destruction on a grand scale" and estimates said it would take at least a year for repairs to be completed. Consideration was being given the building a brand new plant instead of repairing the damaged plant.

Road damage due to landslides included Puerto Rico highways PR-132, PR-139, and PR-218. PR-2 had landslides in the area of Peñón de Ponce; PR-9, a 4-lane highway under construction, had damage that set back the opening date several months; and PR-52 had damage to its Ponce toll booth plaza. Among bridges damaged were two on PR-127 in Guayanilla, at kilometer markers 9.1 and 10.3.

== Aftermath ==
On January 17, Puerto Rico governor fired three members of her Cabinet after a group of Puerto Ricans broke into an enormous State warehouse in the La Guancha sector of Barrio Playa in Ponce and found it fully stocked with emergency items including cots, gas stoves, batteries, water, baby formula, diapers that had been stored there since after Hurricane Maria, and which the governor had not been made aware of. The governor nominated the Adjutant General of the Puerto Rico National Guard to take over the post of fired Office of Emergency Management Secretary and ordered him to immediately move the items to the refugee centers of the municipalities affected by the earthquake and to distribute them to those people needing them.

The Puerto Rican Government contracted the services of nearly 50 structural engineers to evaluate each public school in the Island for structural stability post-earthquake and to certify them as safe enough to open. Classes were delayed more than 10 days island-wide, longer in the two school regions most intensely hit by the earthquakes.

In the aftermath of the main quake and its major aftershocks, thousands of residents, including many whose homes had not been damaged, developed seismophobia and continued sleeping outdoors weeks after the earthquake of January 7.

== Scientific activity ==
On January 10, USGS and Puerto Rico Seismic Network (PRSN) scientists were working to install six sets of temporary seismometers near the southern coast to augment the existing PRSN instruments.

== See also ==
- List of earthquakes in 2020
- List of earthquakes in Puerto Rico
- 2020 Caribbean earthquake
- 2020 in Puerto Rico
- 2020 in the Caribbean
- 2019–2020 dengue fever epidemic
- Hurricane Maria
- COVID-19 pandemic in Puerto Rico
- 2020s
