= La Playa =

La Playa may refer to:

- La Playa de Belén, a municipality in the department of North Santander, Colombia
- La Playa (de Ponce), a barrio in Ponce, Puerto Rico
- La Playa, San Diego, a bayfront neighborhood in Point Loma, San Diego, California, U.S.
- La Playa Trail, a historic route in San Diego, California, U.S.
- La Playa DC, a 2012 Colombian film directed by Juan Andrés Arango
- "La Playa", a song by La Oreja de Van Gogh from the 2000 album El viaje de Copperpot
- "La Playa", a song by Ivy Queen from the 2012 album Musa
- La Playa, a Medellín Metro station
- La Playa Hotel, a hotel in Carmel-by-the-Sea, California

== See also ==
- Playa (disambiguation)
