= Playa, Guayanilla, Puerto Rico =

Barrio of Puerto Rico

Playa
- Barrio
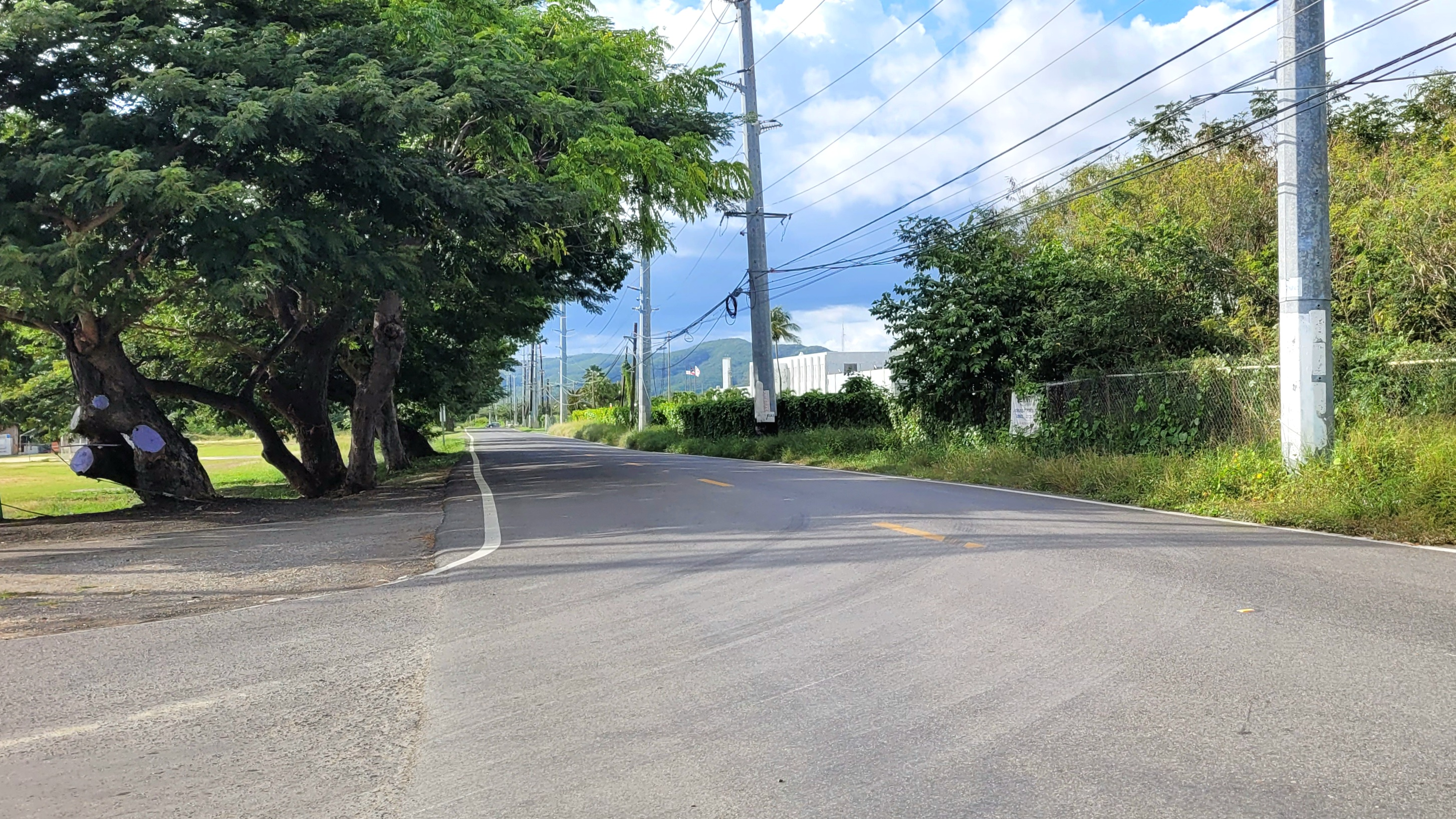
- Puerto Rico Highway 127 between Playa and Cedro

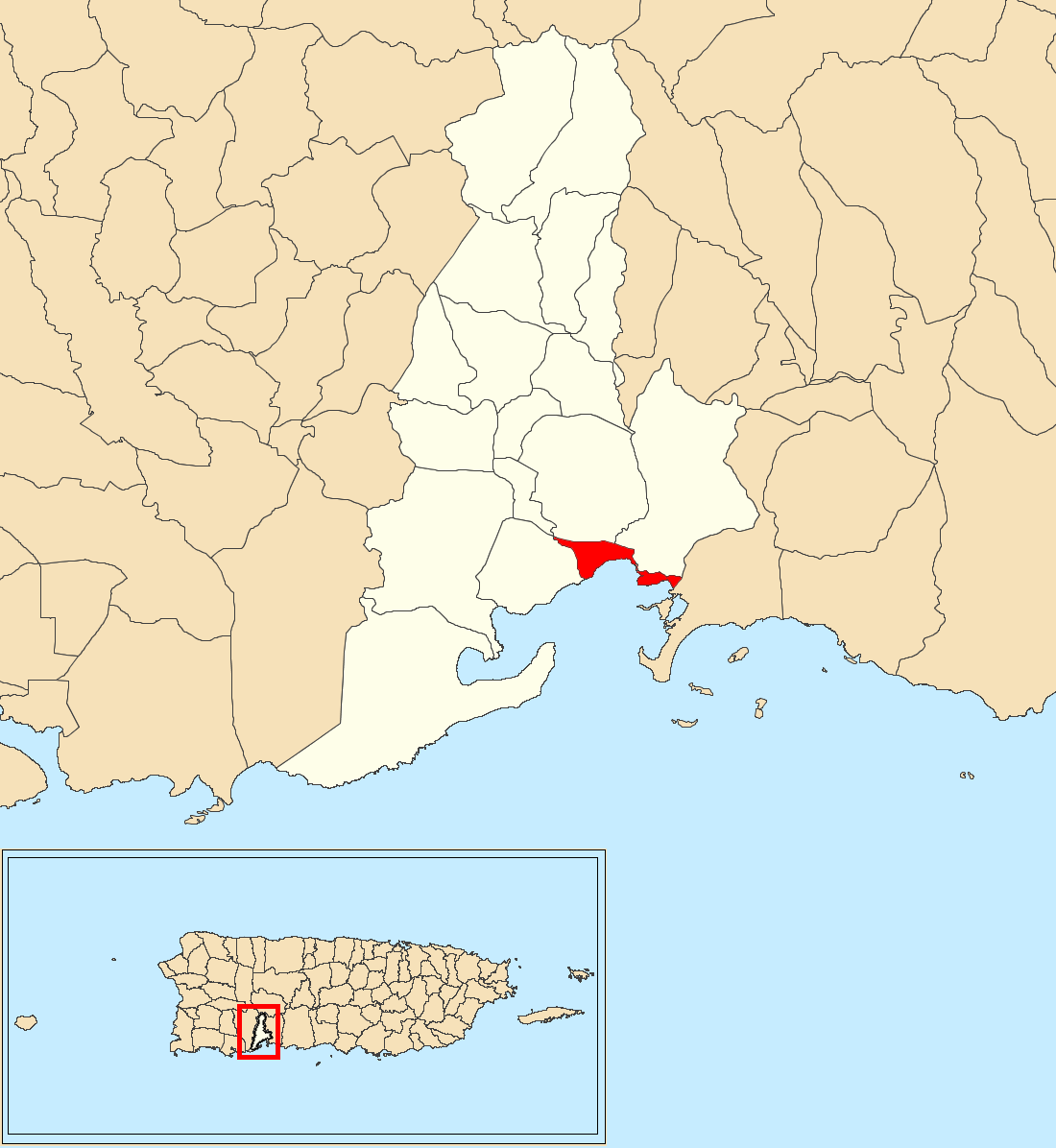
- Location of Playa within the municipality of Guayanilla shown in red

- Location of Puerto Rico
- Coordinates: 18°00′22″N 66°46′08″W
- Commonwealth: Puerto Rico
- Municipality: Guayanilla

Area
  - Total: 1.14 sq mi (3.0 km^{2})
  - Land: 0.52 sq mi (1.3 km^{2})
  - Water: 0.62 sq mi (1.6 km^{2})
- Elevation: 0 ft (0 m)

Population (2010)
  - Total: 1,186
  - Density: 2,280.8/sq mi (880.6/km^{2})
- Source: 2010 Census
- Time zone: UTC−4 (AST)

Playa Barrio is a rural barrio in the municipality of Guayanilla, Puerto Rico. Its population in 2010 was 1,186.

== Features and demographics ==
Playa has .52 square miles (1.3 km^{2}) of land area and .62 square miles (1.6 km^{2}) of water area. In 2010, its population was 1,186 with a population density of 2,280.8 inhabitants per square mile (880.6/km^{2}).

Historical population
Census	Pop.	Note	%±
1910	467		—
1920	427		−8.6%
1930	566		32.6%
1940	909		60.6%
1950	1,287		41.6%
1960	1,635		27.0%
1970	1,704		4.2%
1980	1,471		−13.7%
1990	1,326		−9.9%
2000	1,317		−0.7%
2010	1,186		−9.9%
U.S. Decennial Census; 1900 (N/A) 1910-1930; 1930-1950 1980-2000 2010

== History ==
Playa was in Spain's gazetteers until Puerto Rico was ceded by Spain in the aftermath of the Spanish–American War under the terms of the Treaty of Paris of 1898 and became an unincorporated territory of the United States. In 1899, the United States Department of War conducted a census of Puerto Rico finding that the combined population of Magas and Playa barrios was 962.

== See also ==
- List of communities in Puerto Rico
