= Playa Grande =

Playa Grande (Spanish, Big Beach) may refer to:

- Playa Grande, Guatemala, the administrative center of Ixcán, Guatemala
- Playa Grande, Costa Rica, a beach town in Costa Rica
- Playa Grande, Uruguay, a village and resort in Maldonado, Uruguay
- Las Baulas National Marine Park, a Costa Rican national park also known as "Playa Grande Marine Turtle National Park"

== See also ==
- Big Beach (disambiguation)
- Playa (disambiguation)
