= Big Beach =

"Big Beach" can refer to:

- Big Beach, Nova Scotia, a city in Canada
- Big Beach, a beach in Makena State Park in Hawaii
- Big Beach (company), an American film production company

== See also ==
- Big Beach Sports
- Big Beach Boutique II
- Playa Grande (disambiguation)
