= Playa Azul =

Playa Azul (en: Blue Beach) may refer to:

== Places ==
- Playa Azul (Michoacán), beach town in Michoacán, Mexico
- Playa Azul (Oaxaca), town in the municipality of Salina Cruz, Oaxaca, Mexico
- Playa Azul (Uruguay), town in Colonia department, Uruguay
- Playa Azul, a beach in Huanchaco District, Peru
- Playa Azul, a beach in Cazones de Herrera, Veracruz, Mexico
- Playa Azul, a nickname for Varadero, Cuba

== Other ==
- Playa Azul (Benidorm), one of the tallest buildings in Spain
- Playa Azul, a Mexican film that won Best Original Score at the 34th Ariel Awards
- "Playa Azul", a song by Los Amigos Invisibles from the 2002 album The Venezuelan Zinga Son, Vol. 1
