= Tallaboa Poniente =

Barrio of Peñuelas, Puerto Rico

- Barrio
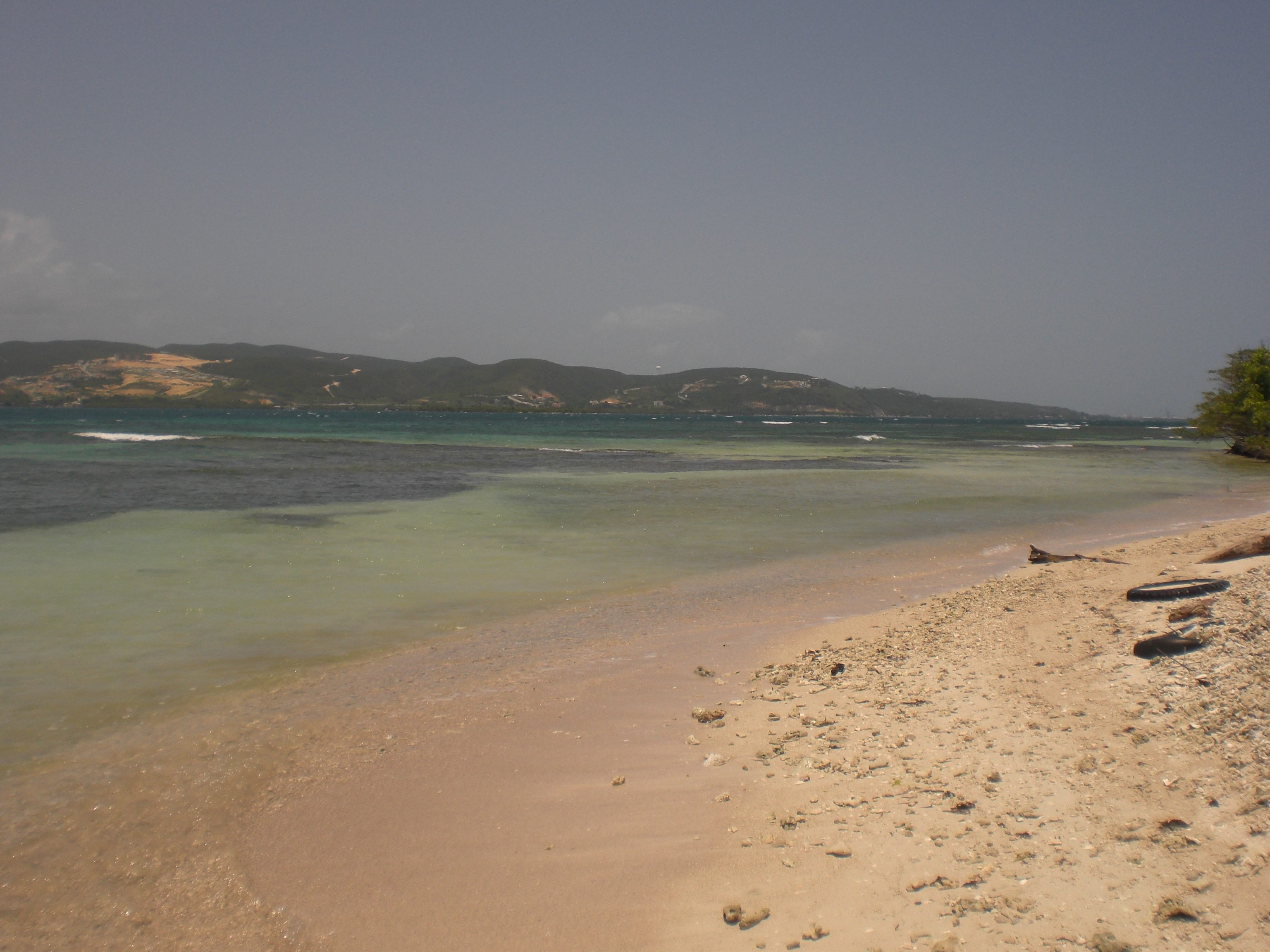
- Cayo Caribe is a cay of Tallaboa Poniente

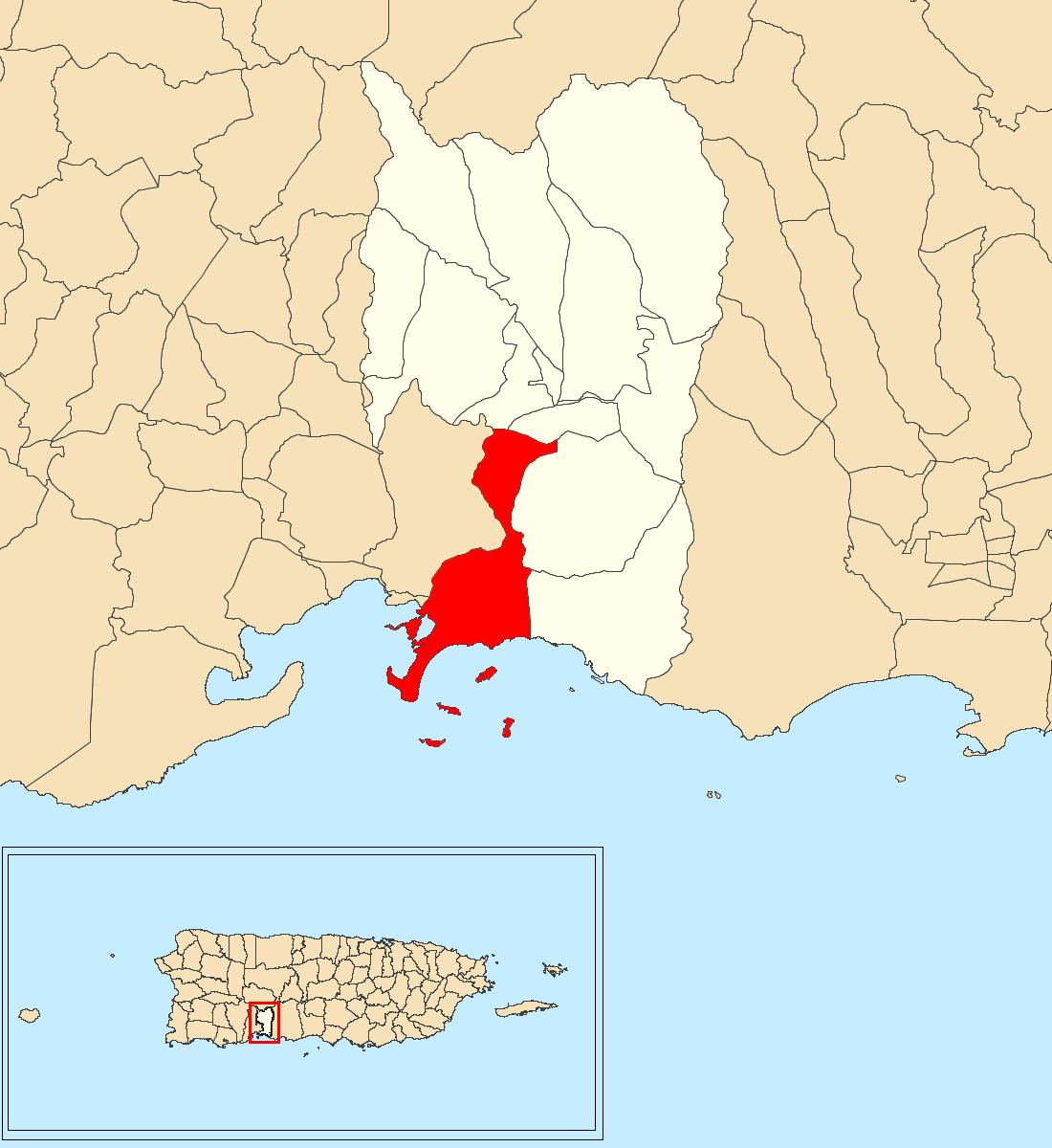
- Location of Tallaboa Poniente within the municipality of Peñuelas shown in red

- Location of Puerto Rico
- Coordinates: 17°58′27″N 66°44′50″W
- Commonwealth: Puerto Rico
- Municipality: Peñuelas

Area
  - Total: 11.12 sq mi (28.8 km^{2})
  - Land: 4.05 sq mi (10.5 km^{2})
  - Water: 7.07 sq mi (18.3 km^{2})
- Elevation: 0 ft (0 m)

Population (2010)
  - Total: 696
  - Density: 171.9/sq mi (66.4/km^{2})
- Source: 2010 Census
- Time zone: UTC−4 (AST)

Tallaboa Poniente is a barrio in the municipality of Peñuelas, Puerto Rico. Its population in 2010 was 696. The barrio is bordered by the Bahía Tallaboa (Tallaboa Bay) to the east and the Bahía de Guayanilla (Guayanilla Bay) to the west.

== History ==
Tallaboa was an important village, led by "beloved caciques", before the Spanish and European colonization of Puerto Rico in the late 15th century.

Tallaboa Poniente was in Spain's gazetteers until Puerto Rico was ceded by Spain in the aftermath of the Spanish–American War under the terms of the Treaty of Paris of 1898 and became an unincorporated territory of the United States. In 1899, the United States Department of War conducted a census of Puerto Rico finding that the population of Tallaboa Poniente barrio was 874.

Historical population
Census	Pop.	Note	%±
1900	874		—
1910	1,055		20.7%
1920	1,087		3.0%
1930	928		−14.6%
1940	951		2.5%
1950	1,156		21.6%
1960	773		−33.1%
1970	679		−12.2%
1980	699		2.9%
1990	641		−8.3%
2000	697		8.7%
2010	696		−0.1%
U.S. Decennial Census; 1899 (shown as 1900) 1910-1930; 1930-1950 1980-2000 2010

== See also ==
- List of communities in Puerto Rico
