= Guayanilla barrio-pueblo =

Historical and administrative center (seat) of Guayanilla, Puerto Rico

Guayanilla barrio-pueblo Pueblo de Guayanilla
- Municipality Seat
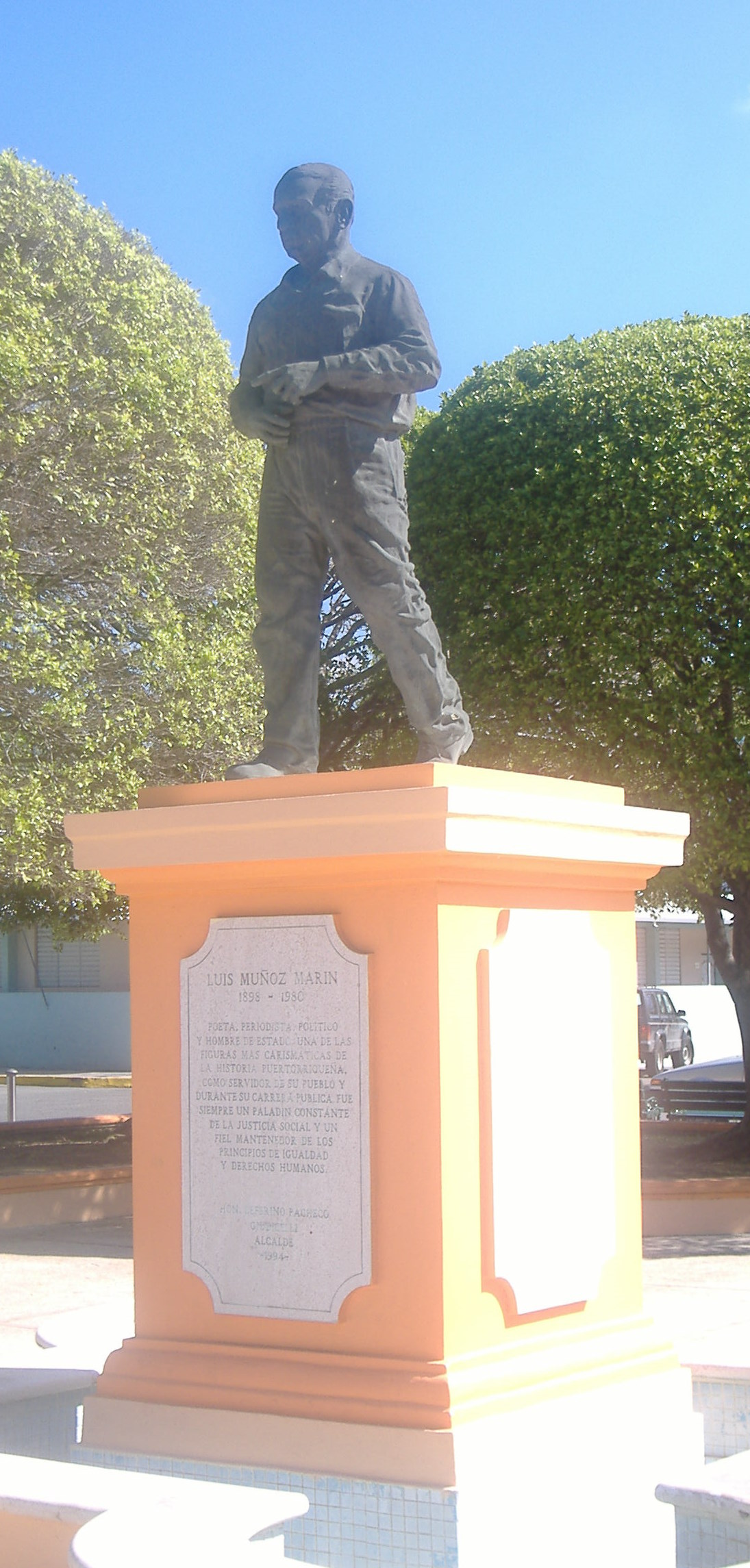
- Statue of Luis Muñoz Marín, the 1st elected governor of Puerto Rico

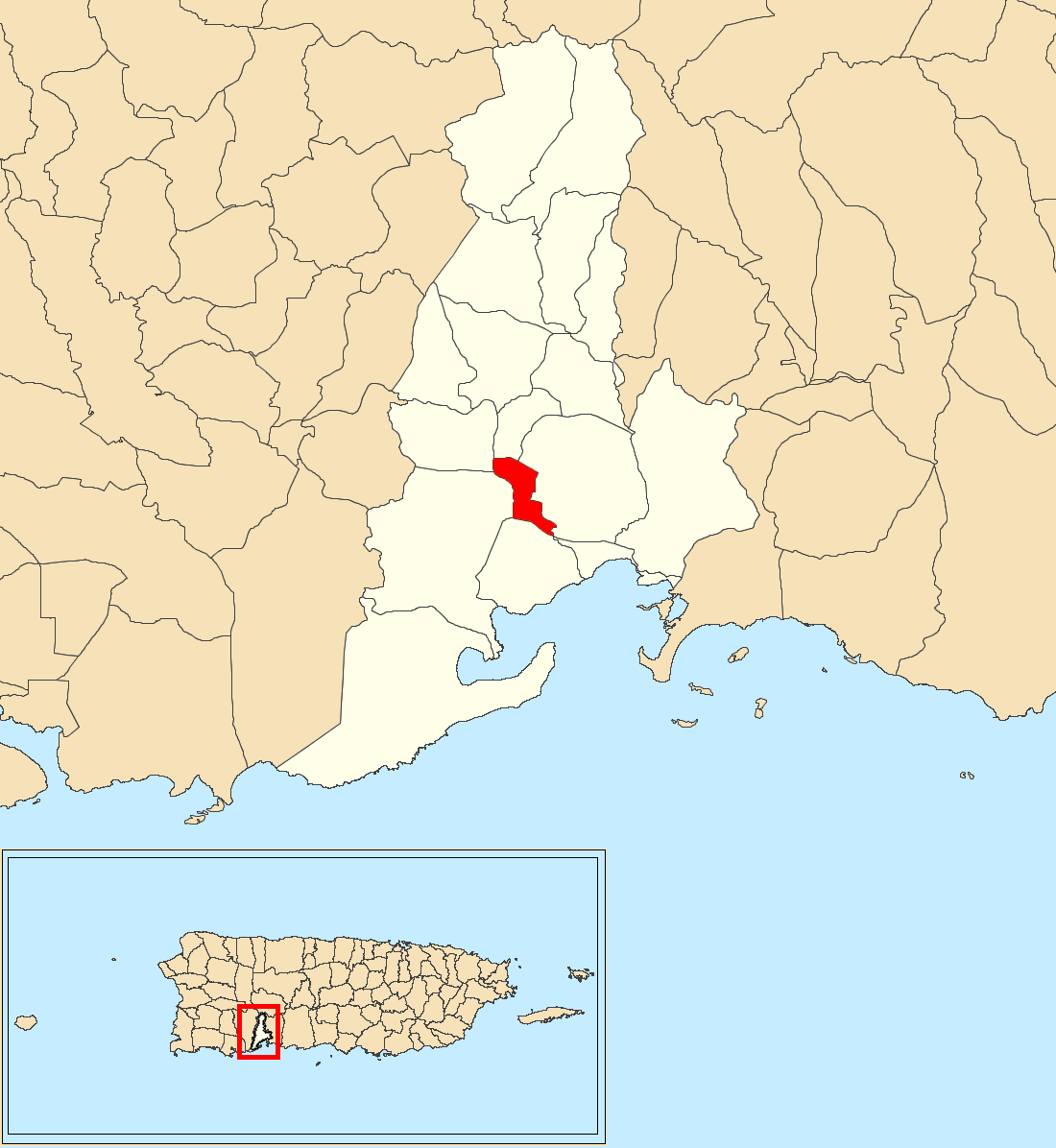
- Location of Guayanilla barrio-pueblo within the municipality of Guayanilla shown in red

- Location of Puerto Rico
- Coordinates: 18°01′22″N 66°47′28″W
- Commonwealth: Puerto Rico
- Municipality: Guayanilla

Area
  - Total: 0.54 sq mi (1.4 km^{2})
  - Land: 0.54 sq mi (1.4 km^{2})
  - Water: 0 sq mi (0 km^{2})
- Elevation: 52 ft (16 m)

Population (2010)
  - Total: 3,757
  - Density: 6,957.4/sq mi (2,686.3/km^{2})
- Source: 2010 Census
- Time zone: UTC−4 (AST)

Guayanilla barrio-pueblo is an urban barrio and the administrative center (seat) of Guayanilla, a municipality of Puerto Rico. Its population in 2010 was 3,757.

As was customary in Spain, in Puerto Rico, the municipality has a barrio called pueblo which contains a central plaza, the municipal buildings (city hall), and a Catholic church. Fiestas patronales (patron saint festivals) are held in the central plaza every year.

== Features and demographics ==
Guayanilla barrio-pueblo has .54 square miles (1.4 km^{2}) of land area and no water area. In 2010, its population was 3,757 with a population density of 6,957.4 inhabitants per square mile (2,686.3/km^{2}).

Historical population
Census	Pop.	Note	%±
1900	973		—
1910	1,141		17.3%
1920	1,434		25.7%
1930	2,044		42.5%
1940	1,266		−38.1%
1950	3,113		145.9%
1960	3,067		−1.5%
1970	0		−100.0%
1980	5,611		—
1990	5,238		−6.6%
2000	4,832		−7.8%
2010	3,757		−22.2%
U.S. Decennial Census; 1899 (shown as 1900) 1910-1930; 1930-1950 1980-2000 2010

== The central plaza and its church ==
The central plaza, or square, is a place for official and unofficial recreational events and a place where people can gather and socialize from dusk to dawn. The Laws of the Indies, Spanish law, which regulated life in Puerto Rico in the early 19th century, stated the plaza's purpose was for "the parties" (celebrations, festivities) (Spanish: a propósito para las fiestas), and that the square should be proportionally large enough for the number of neighbors (Spanish: grandeza proporcionada al número de vecinos). These Spanish regulations also stated that the streets nearby should be comfortable portals for passersby, protecting them from the elements: sun and rain.

Located across the central plaza in Guayanilla barrio-pueblo was the Parroquia Inmaculada Concepción (English: Church Inmaculada Concepción of Guayanilla), a Roman Catholic church. The church was destroyed during the 2019–20 Puerto Rico earthquakes.

== History ==
Guayanilla barrio-pueblo was in Spain's gazetteers until Puerto Rico was ceded by Spain in the aftermath of the Spanish–American War under the terms of the Treaty of Paris of 1898 and became an unincorporated territory of the United States. In 1899, the United States Department of War conducted a census of Puerto Rico finding that the population of Pueblo barrio was 973.

=== Earthquakes in 2020 ===
On January 7, 2020, a 6.4 magnitude earthquake destroyed the parish church and other structures in Guayanilla Pueblo. A day before, a 5.7 magnitude earthquake had destroyed various structures and cars.

== Gallery ==
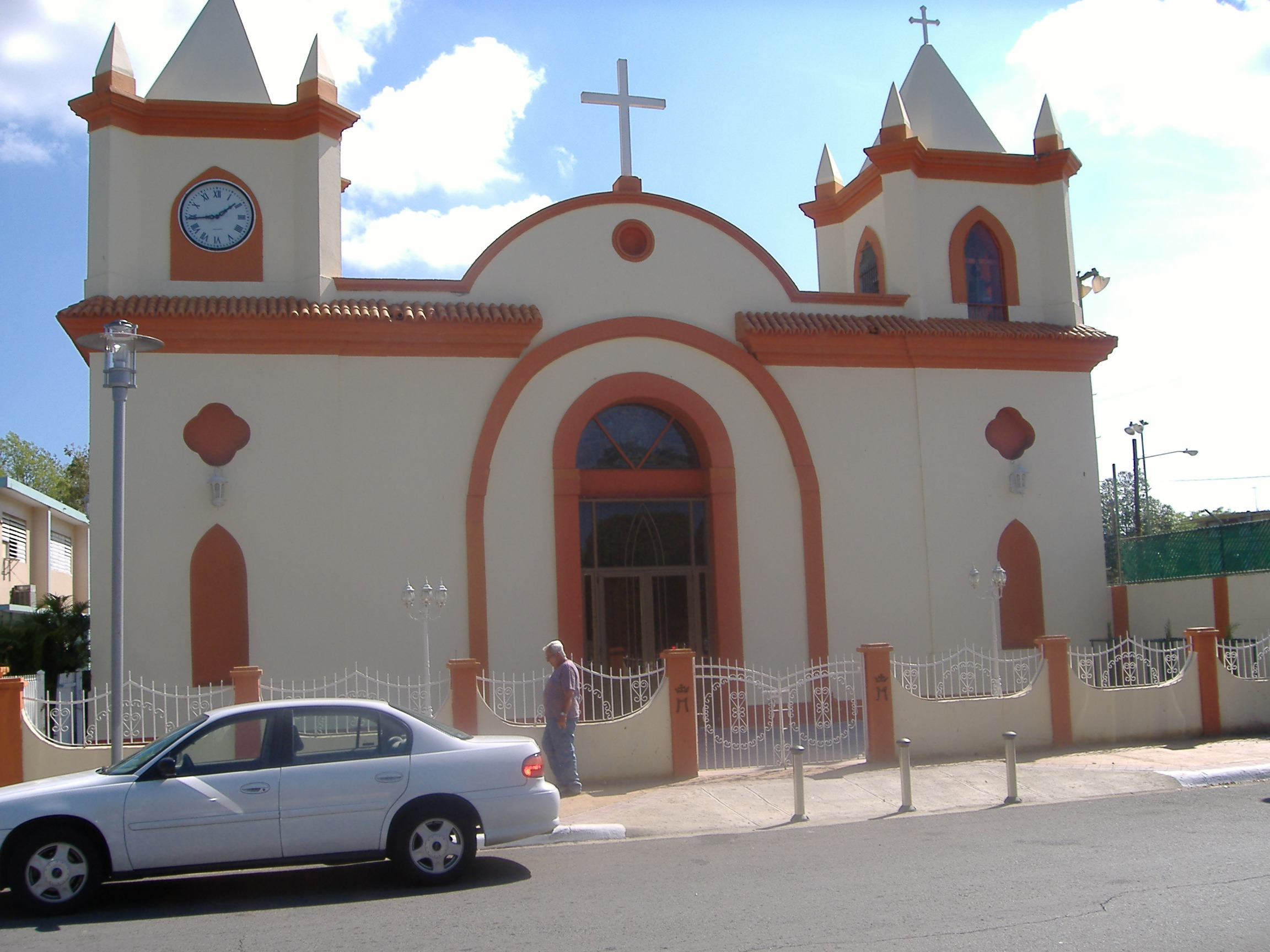
The Guayanilla Catholic Church is seen standing before its destruction by an earthquake in 2020

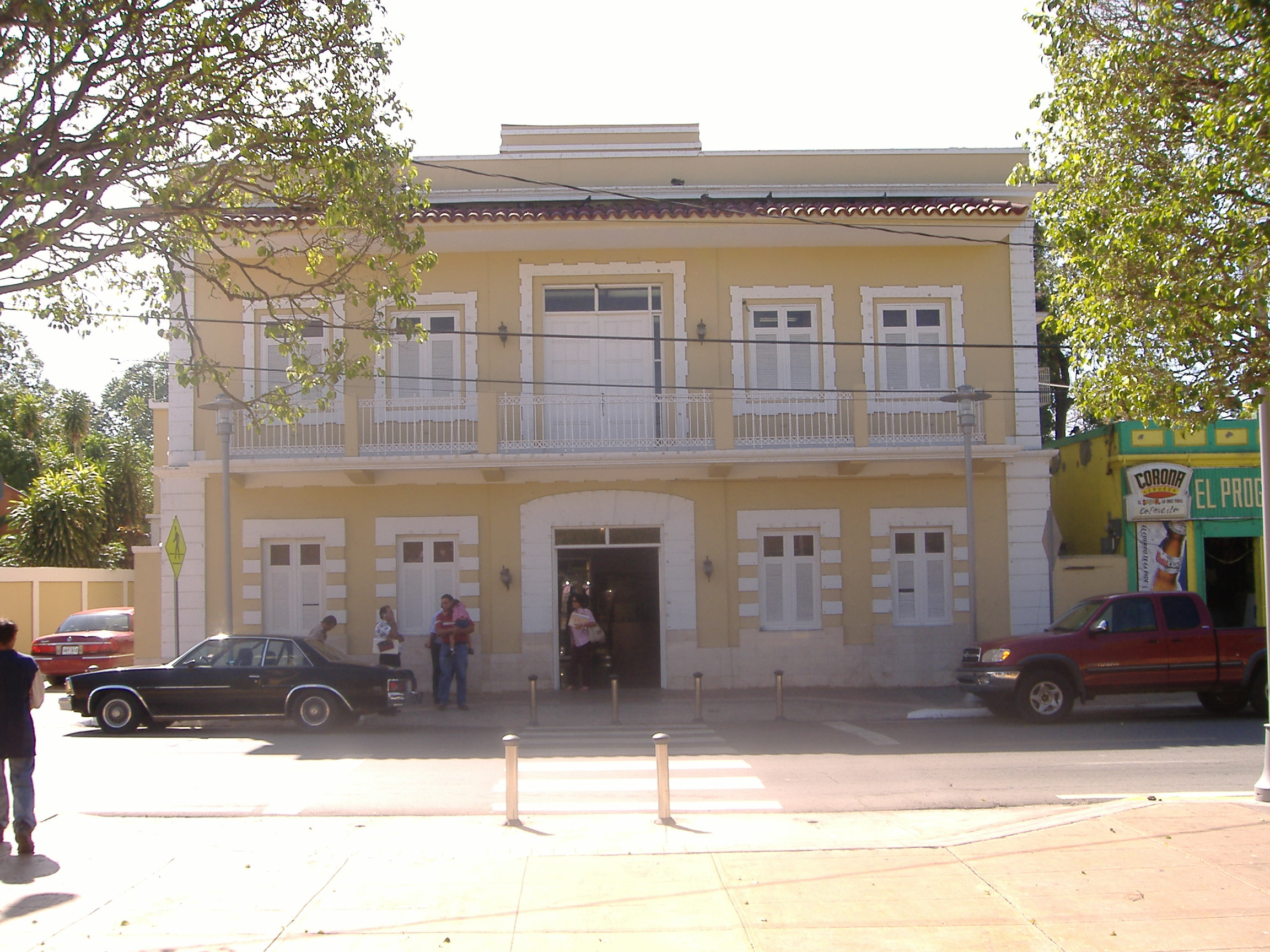
Guayanilla City Hall

== See also ==
- List of communities in Puerto Rico
