= Magas, Guayanilla, Puerto Rico =

Barrio of Puerto Rico

Magas
- Barrio
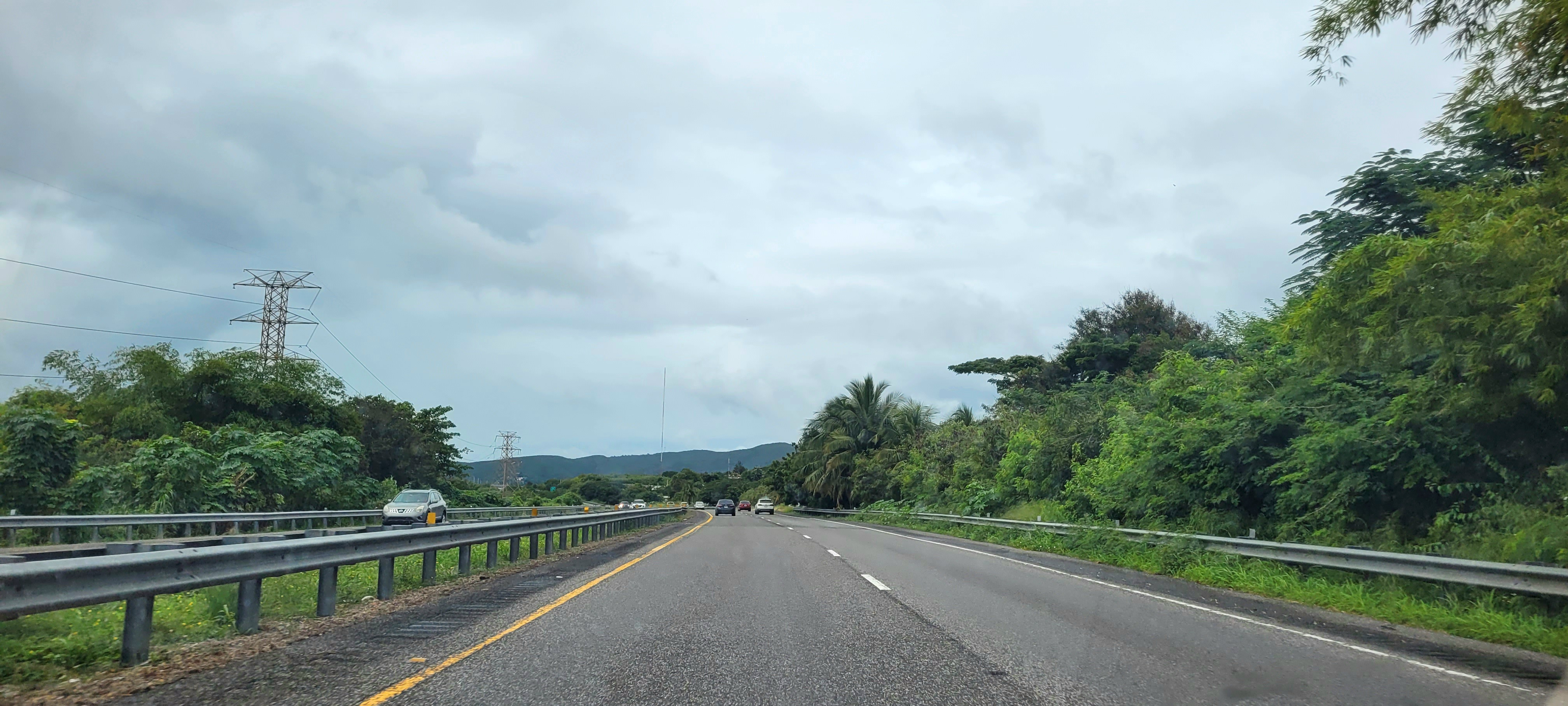
- Puerto Rico Highway 2 between Cedro and Magas

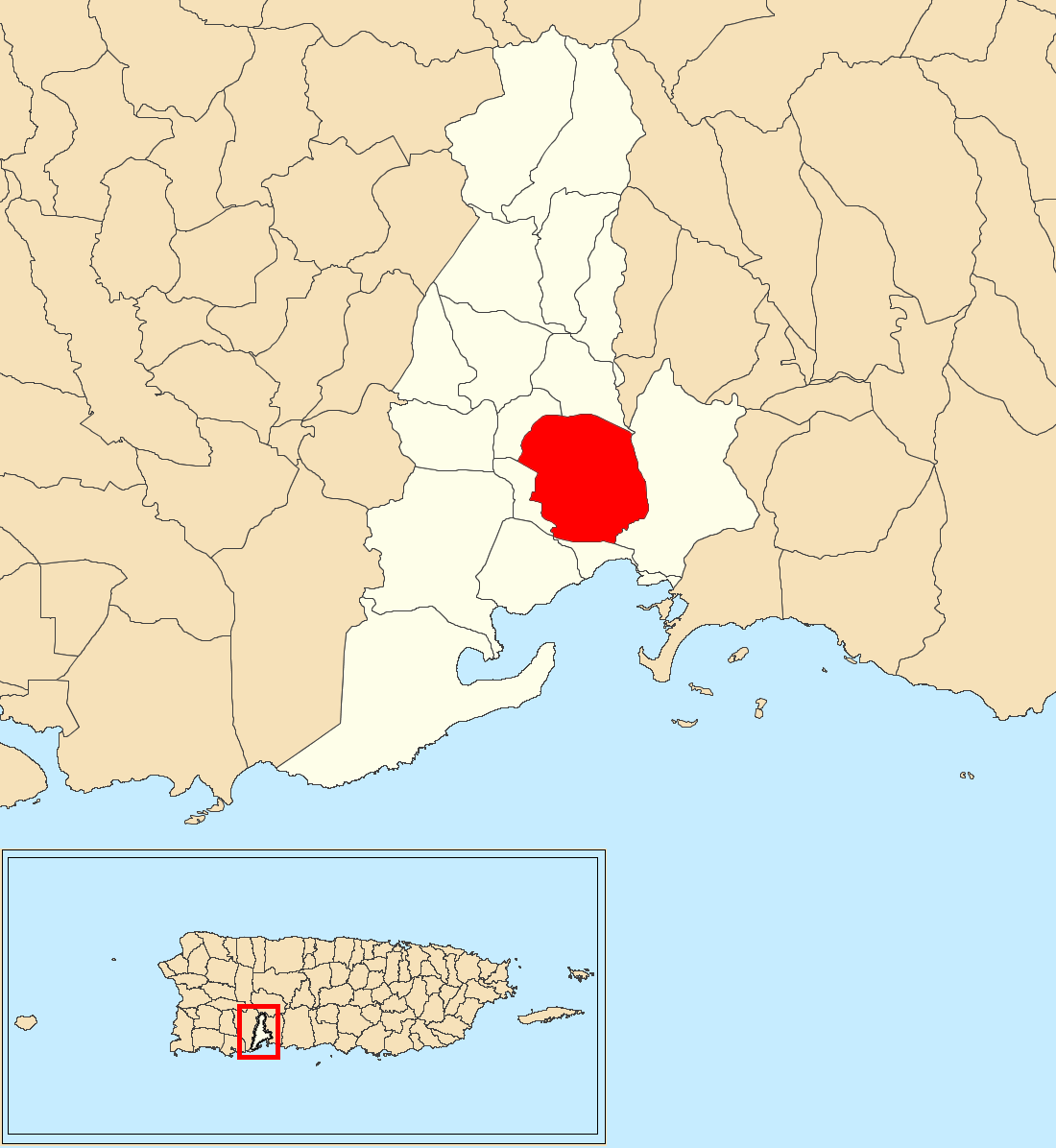
- Location of Magas within the municipality of Guayanilla shown in red

- Location of Puerto Rico
- Coordinates: 18°01′36″N 66°46′34″W
- Commonwealth: Puerto Rico
- Municipality: Guayanilla

Area
  - Total: 3.44 sq mi (8.9 km^{2})
  - Land: 3.44 sq mi (8.9 km^{2})
  - Water: 0 sq mi (0 km^{2})
- Elevation: 410 ft (120 m)

Population (2010)
  - Total: 3,436
  - Density: 998.8/sq mi (385.6/km^{2})
- Source: 2010 Census
- Time zone: UTC−4 (AST)

Magas is a rural barrio with an urban area in the municipality of Guayanilla, Puerto Rico. Its population in 2010 was 3,436.

== Features and demographics ==
Magas has 3.44 square miles (8.9 km^{2}) of land area and no water area. In 2010, its population was 3,436 with a population density of 998.8 inhabitants per square mile (385.6/km^{2}).

Historical population
Census	Pop.	Note	%±
1910	758		—
1920	792		4.5%
1930	926		16.9%
1940	1,221		31.9%
1950	1,547		26.7%
1960	2,219		43.4%
1970	0		−100.0%
1980	2,346		—
1990	2,421		3.2%
2000	3,465		43.1%
2010	3,436		−0.8%
U.S. Decennial Census; 1900 (N/A) 1910-1930; 1930-1950 1980-2000 2010

== History ==
Magas was in Spain's gazetteers until Puerto Rico was ceded by Spain in the aftermath of the Spanish–American War under the terms of the Treaty of Paris of 1898 and became an unincorporated territory of the United States. In 1899, the United States Department of War conducted a census of Puerto Rico finding that the combined population of Magas and Playa barrios was 962.

== See also ==
- List of communities in Puerto Rico
