= Cedro, Guayanilla, Puerto Rico =

Barrio of Puerto Rico

Cedro
- Barrio
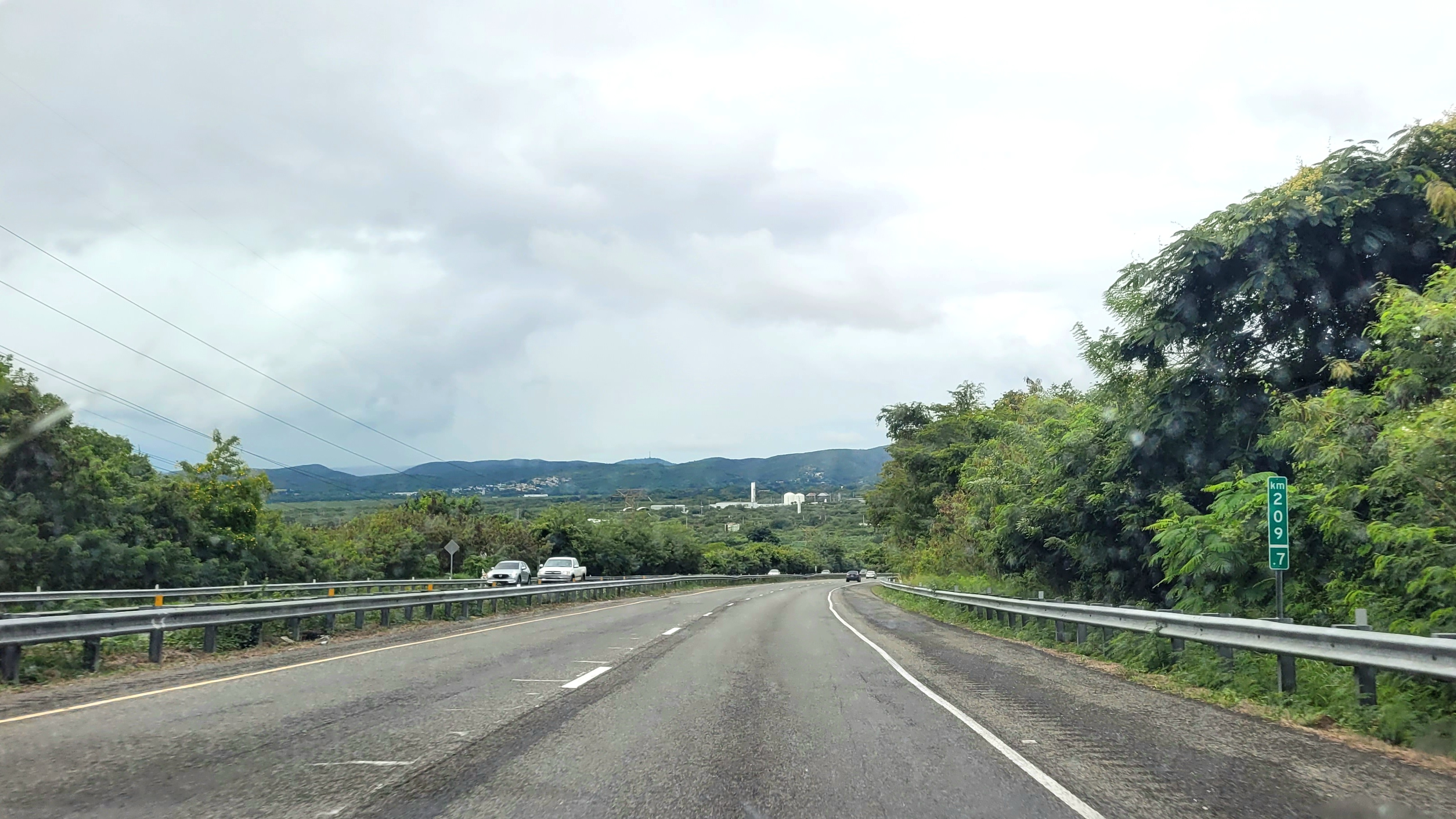
- Puerto Rico Highway 2 in Cedro

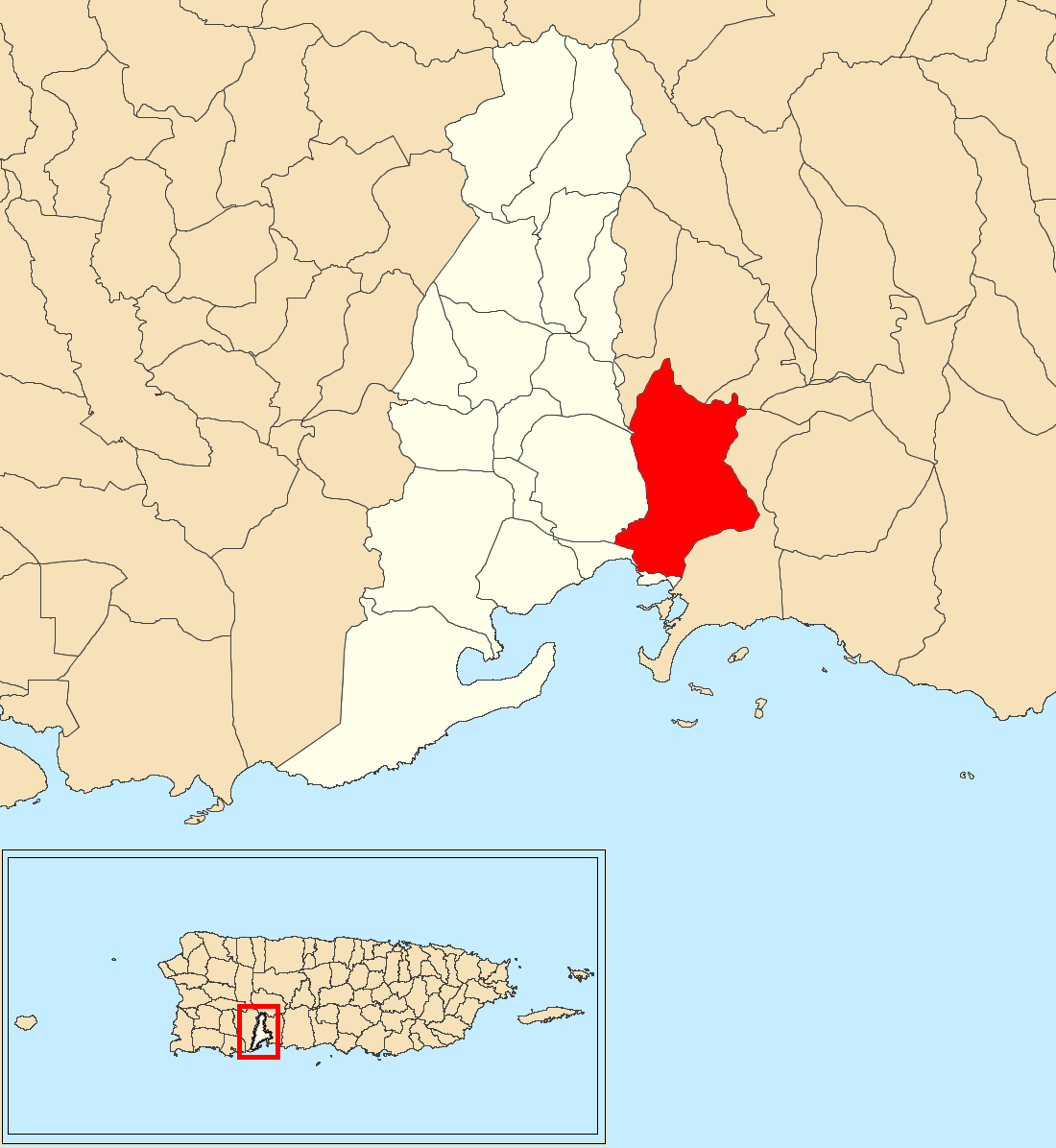
- Location of Cedro within the municipality of Guayanilla shown in red

- Location of Puerto Rico
- Coordinates: 18°01′31″N 66°44′54″W
- Commonwealth: Puerto Rico
- Municipality: Guayanilla

Area
  - Total: 4.77 sq mi (12.4 km^{2})
  - Land: 4.77 sq mi (12.4 km^{2})
  - Water: 0 sq mi (0 km^{2})
- Elevation: 279 ft (85 m)

Population (2010)
  - Total: 0
  - Density: 0/sq mi (0/km^{2})
- Source: 2010 Census
- Time zone: UTC−4 (AST)

Cedro (Barrio Cedro) is an uninhabited rural barrio in the municipality of Guayanilla, Puerto Rico. Its population in 2010 was 0.

== Features and demographics ==
Cedro has 4.77 square miles (12.4 km^{2}) of land area and no water area. Historically, Cedro has had a low population and in 2010, its population was 0.

Historical population
| Census | Pop. | Note | %± |
|---|---|---|---|
| 1930 | 245 | | — |
| 1940 | 290 | | 18.4% |
| 1950 | 358 | | 23.4% |
| 1960 | 145 | | −59.5% |
| 1970 | 18 | | −87.6% |
| 1980 | 4 | | −77.8% |
| 1990 | 1 | | −75.0% |
| 2000 | 14 | | 1,300.0% |
| 2010 | 0 | | −100.0% |
U.S. Decennial Census; 1899 (shown as 1900) 1910-1930; 1930-1950 1980-2000 2010

== See also ==
- List of communities in Puerto Rico
