= Río Prieto =

Río Prieto may refer to:

== Rivers ==
- Río Prieto (Lares, Puerto Rico)
- Río Prieto (Maricao, Puerto Rico)
- Río Prieto (Naguabo, Puerto Rico)
- Río Prieto (Ponce, Puerto Rico)
- Río Prieto (Yabucoa, Puerto Rico)

== Other uses ==
- Río Prieto, Lares, Puerto Rico, a barrio
- Río Prieto, Yauco, Puerto Rico, a barrio
- Rio Preto State Park, Minas Gerais, Brazil

== See also ==
- Rio Preto (disambiguation)
