= Prieto River =

Prieto River may refer to:

- Prieto River (Lares, Puerto Rico), where Spanish soldiers drowned in 1898
- Prieto River (Maricao, Puerto Rico)
- Prieto River (Naguabo, Puerto Rico)
- Prieto River (Ponce, Puerto Rico), a tributary of the Cerrillos River
- Prieto River (Yabucoa, Puerto Rico)
