= List of rivers of Puerto Rico =

Map with highways and waterways in Puerto Rico

List of rivers in Puerto Rico (U.S. Commonwealth), sorted by drainage basin and then alphabetically. There are 47 main rivers and 24 lagoons or reservoirs.

Most of Puerto Rico's rivers originate in the Cordillera Central. There are four slopes through which rainwater flows towards the sea. According to their orientation they are known as the north or Atlantic slope; southern slope or the Caribbean Sea; the east slope of the Virgin Passage and the Sonda de Vieques and the west slope or the Mona Passage. Due to the generally abundant rain and the flow of its water currents, the most important rivers of Puerto Rico slide down the north slope. Taíno and native people normally built their communities near the rivers. During the Spanish colonization era, the same was true with many pueblos being founded near rivers.

There are about 5,385 miles of river in Puerto Rico; 224 rivers and 553 named streams. Only 8.9 miles of Puerto Rico's rivers have the official U.S. Wild and Scenic River Designation.

== Note ==
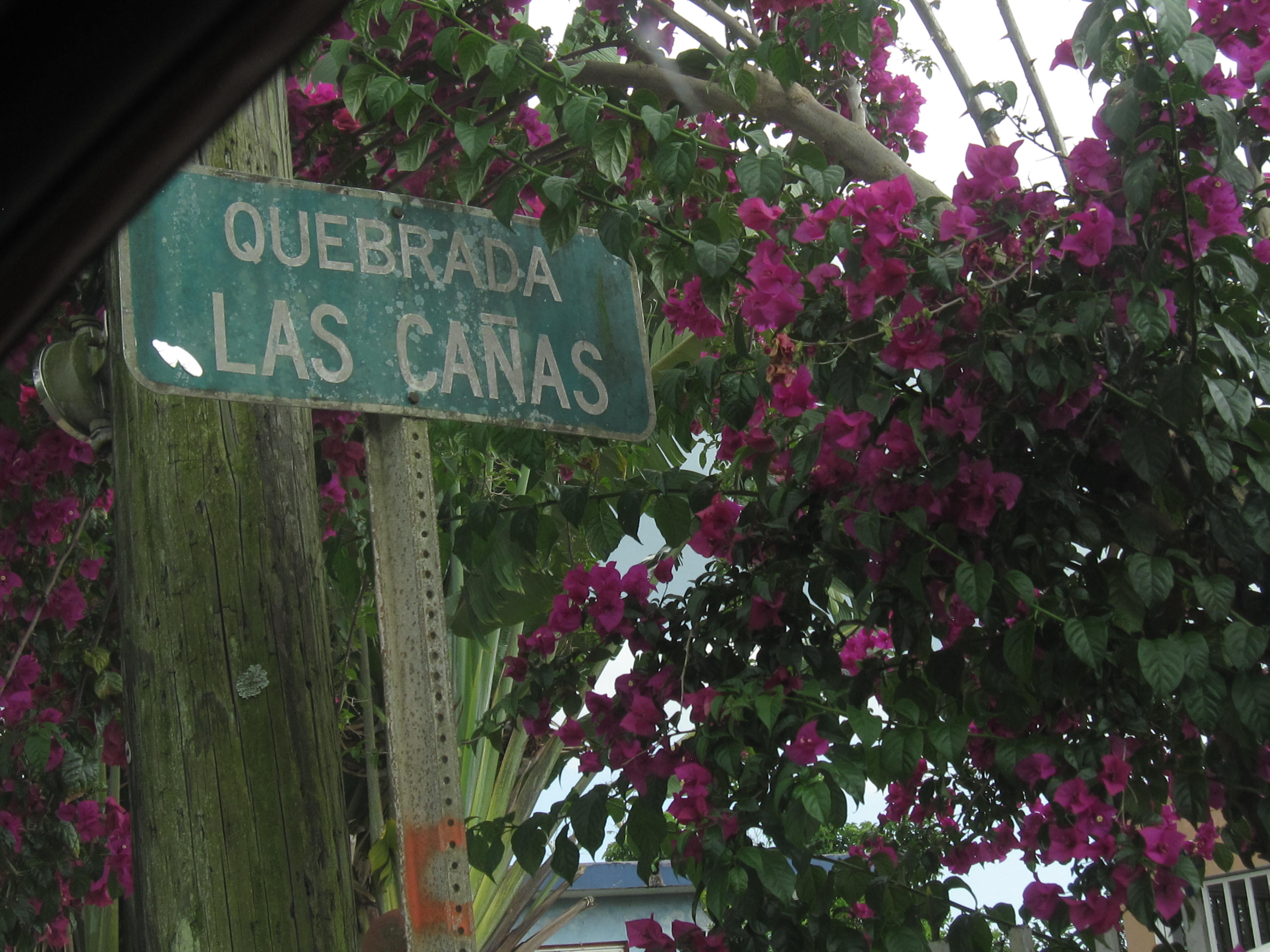
Sign on the side of PR-435 in San Sebastián indicating there is a quebrada (stream)

- A quebrada is a stream.
- An arroyo or ensenada is a creek.
- A río is a river.
- A canal or caño is a channel.
- A cayo is a cay.

== Reservoirs and lagoons ==
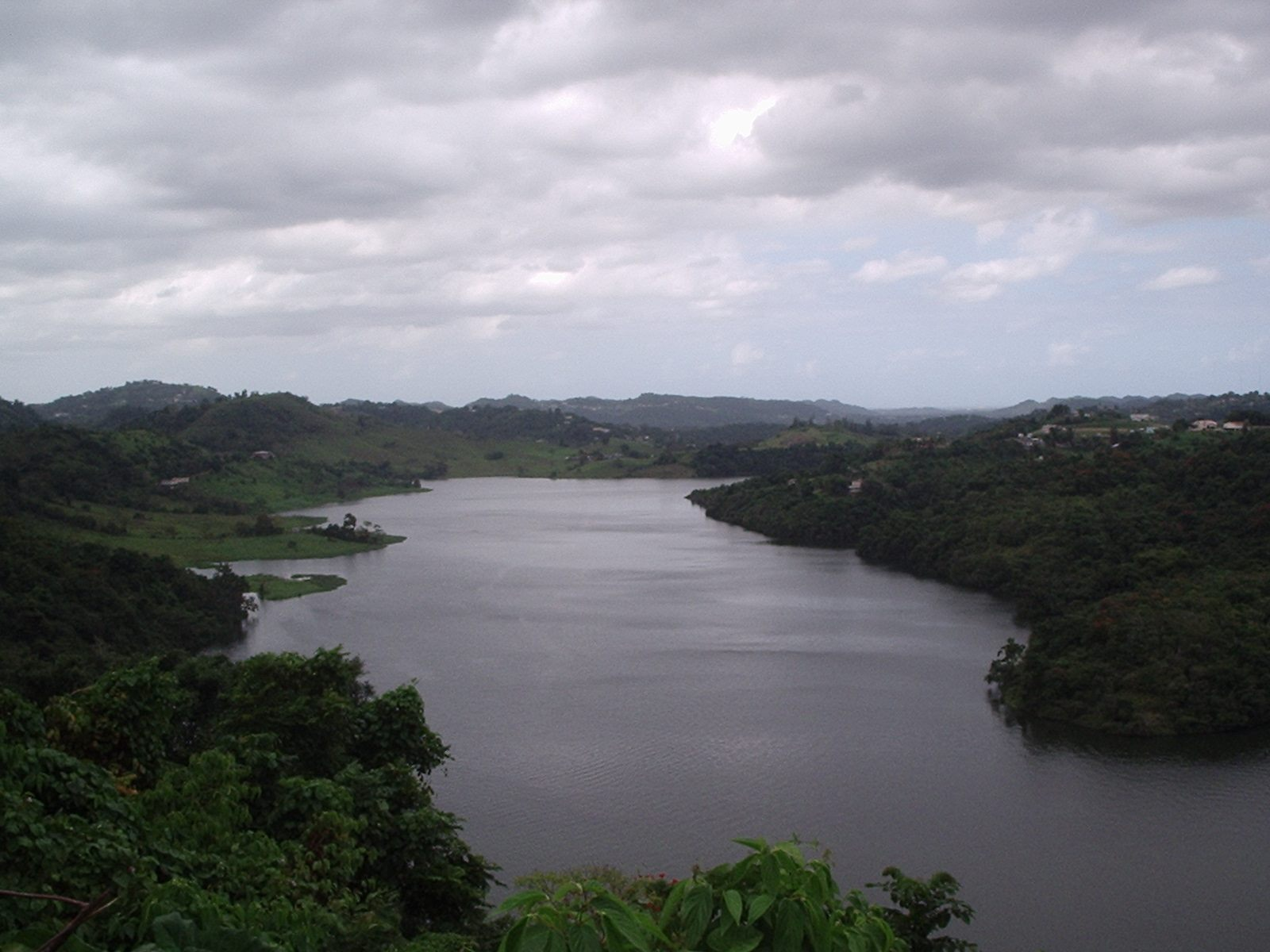
Lago La Plata

These are also reservoirs and lagoons in Puerto Rico:

1. Guajataca
2. Garzas
3. Dos Bocas
4. Caonillas
5. Laguna Tortuguero
6. La Plata
7. Cidra
8. Laguna San José and Laguna Los Corozos
9. Carraízo
10. Laguna Piñones and Laguna Torrecilla
11. Fajardo
12. Valenciano (in planning)
13. Patillas
14. Carite
15. Toa Vaca
16. Guayabal
17. Cerrillos
18. Garzas
19. Luchetti
20. Loco
21. Laguna Guánica (drained)
22. Laguna Cartagena (refuge)
23. Laguna Joyuda
24. Casei (in planning)
25. El Guineo
26. Matrulla

== By drainage basin ==
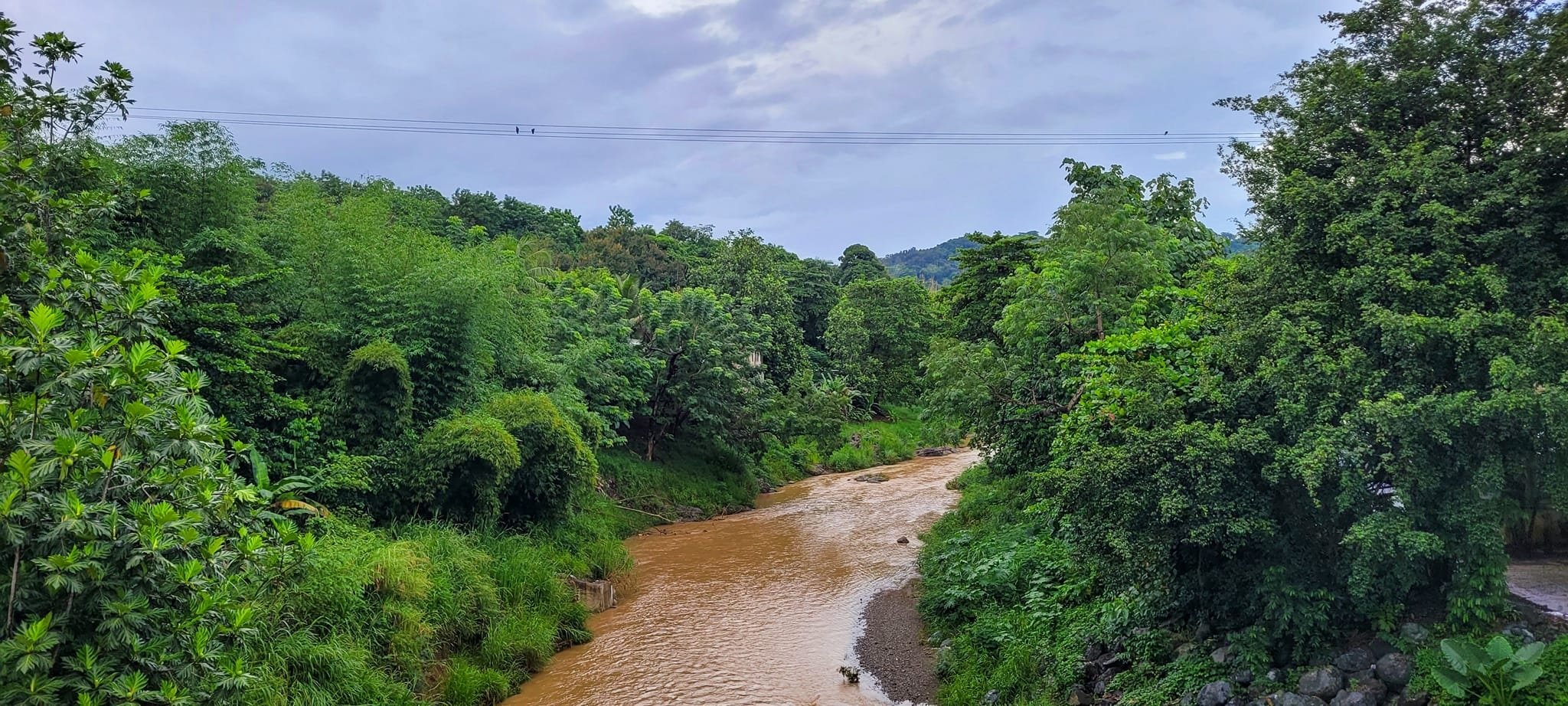
Río Bayamón, 2024

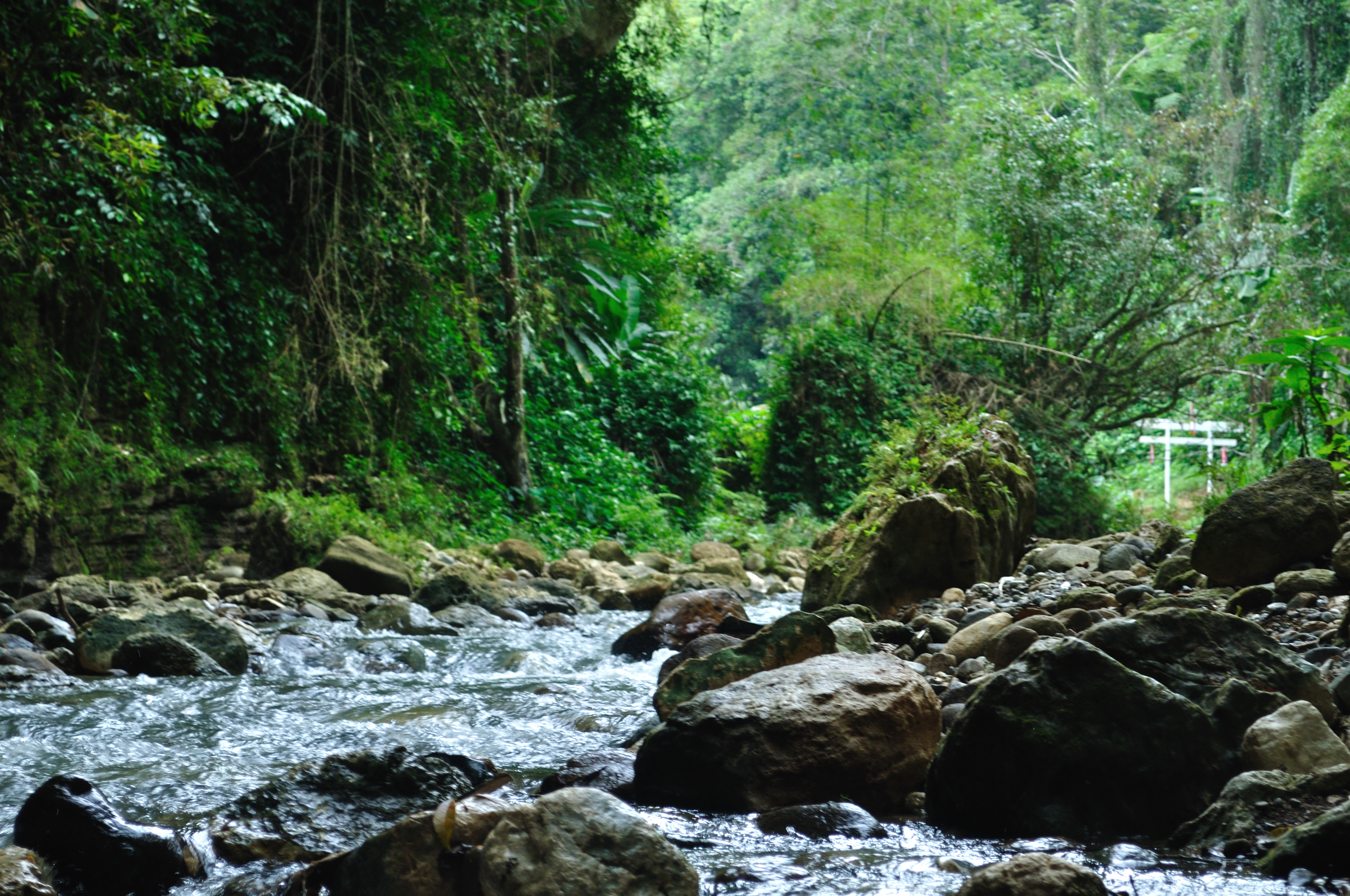
Tanamá in Utuado

Rivers of Puerto Rico listed by drainage basin:

=== North Coast (Atlantic Ocean) ===
- Río Guajataca
  - Río Chiquito de Cibao
- Río Camuy
  - Río Criminales
  - Río Piedras
  - Río Ángeles
- Río Grande de Arecibo
  - Río Tanamá
    - Río Coabey
  - Río Caonillas
    - Río Limón
      - Río Yunes
      - Río La Venta
      - Río Palmarejo
      - Río Naranjito
    - Río Jauca
    - Río Grande de Jayuya
      - Río Zamas
      - Río Caricaboa
        - Río Veguitas
      - Río Saliente
        - Río Salientito
  - Río de Caguana
    - Río de Caguanita
  - Río Viví
  - Río Guaonica
    - Río Roncador
  - Río Pellejas
  - Río Cidra
  - Río de las Vacas
    - Río Garzas
  - Río Saltillo
    - Río de la Ciénaga
- Río Grande de Manatí
  - Río Cialitos
    - Río Barbas
  - Río Bauta
    - Río Toro Negro
      - Río Matrullas
    - Río Culebra
  - Río Sana Muerto
  - Río Orocovis
    - Río Botijas
      - Río Cañabón
- Río Cibuco
  - Río Indio
    - Río Morovis
    - Río Unibón
  - Río Mavilla
  - Río Corozal
    - Río de los Negros
    - Río Dos Bocas
- Río de la Plata
  - Río Nuevo
  - Río Lajas
  - Río Bucarabones
  - Río Cañas
  - Río Cuesta Arriba
  - Río Guadiana
  - Río Arroyata
  - Río Hondo
    - Río Caliente
    - Río Frío
  - Río Usabón
    - Río de Barranquitas
    - Río de Aibonito
  - Río Matón
  - Río Guavate
  - Río Chiquito
- Río Cocal
- Río Bayamón
  - Río Hondo
  - Río Guaynabo
  - Río Minillas
  - Río Clavijo
- Río Puerto Nuevo
  - Río Piedras
- Río Grande de Loíza
  - Río Canóvanas
    - Río Cubuy
  - Río Canovanillas
  - Río Cañas
  - Río Gurabo
    - Río Valenciano
  - Río Bairoa
  - Río Cagüitas
    - Río Cañaboncito
  - Río Turabo
  - Río Cayaguas
    - Río de las Vegas
  - Río Emajagua
- Río Herrera
- Río Grande (Río El Yunque)
  - Río Espíritu Santo
- Río Mameyes
  - Río de la Mina
- Río Sabana
  - Río Pitahaya
  - Río del Cristal
  - Río Camándulas
- Río Juan Martín

=== East Coast (Vieques Passage) ===
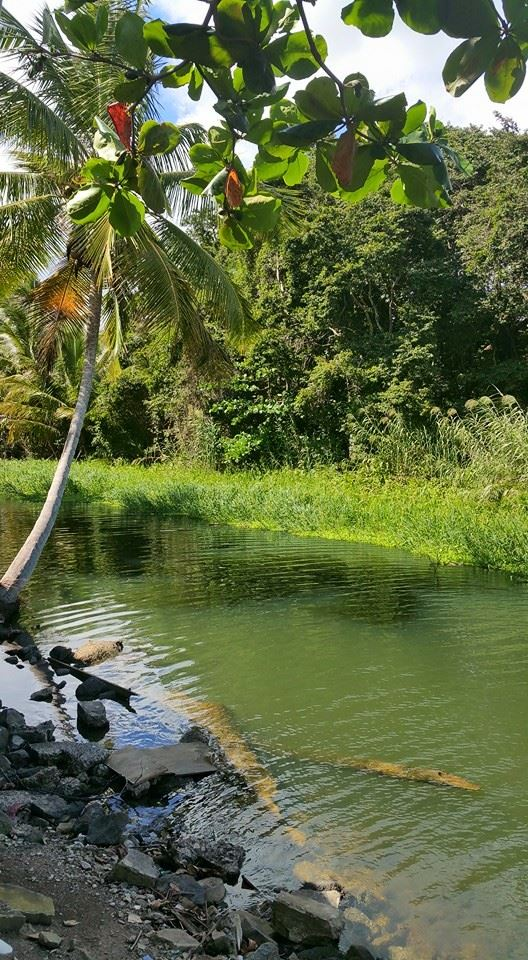
Río Santiago

- Río Fajardo
- Río Demajagua
- Río Daguao
- Río Santiago
- Río Blanco
  - Río Cubuy
  - Río Icacos
    - Río Sabana
  - Río Prieto
- Río Antón Ruiz
- Río Humacao
- Río Candelero
- Río Guayanes
  - Río del Ingenio
  - Río Limones
  - Río Arenas
  - Río Prieto
- Caño de Santiago

=== South Coast (Caribbean Sea) ===
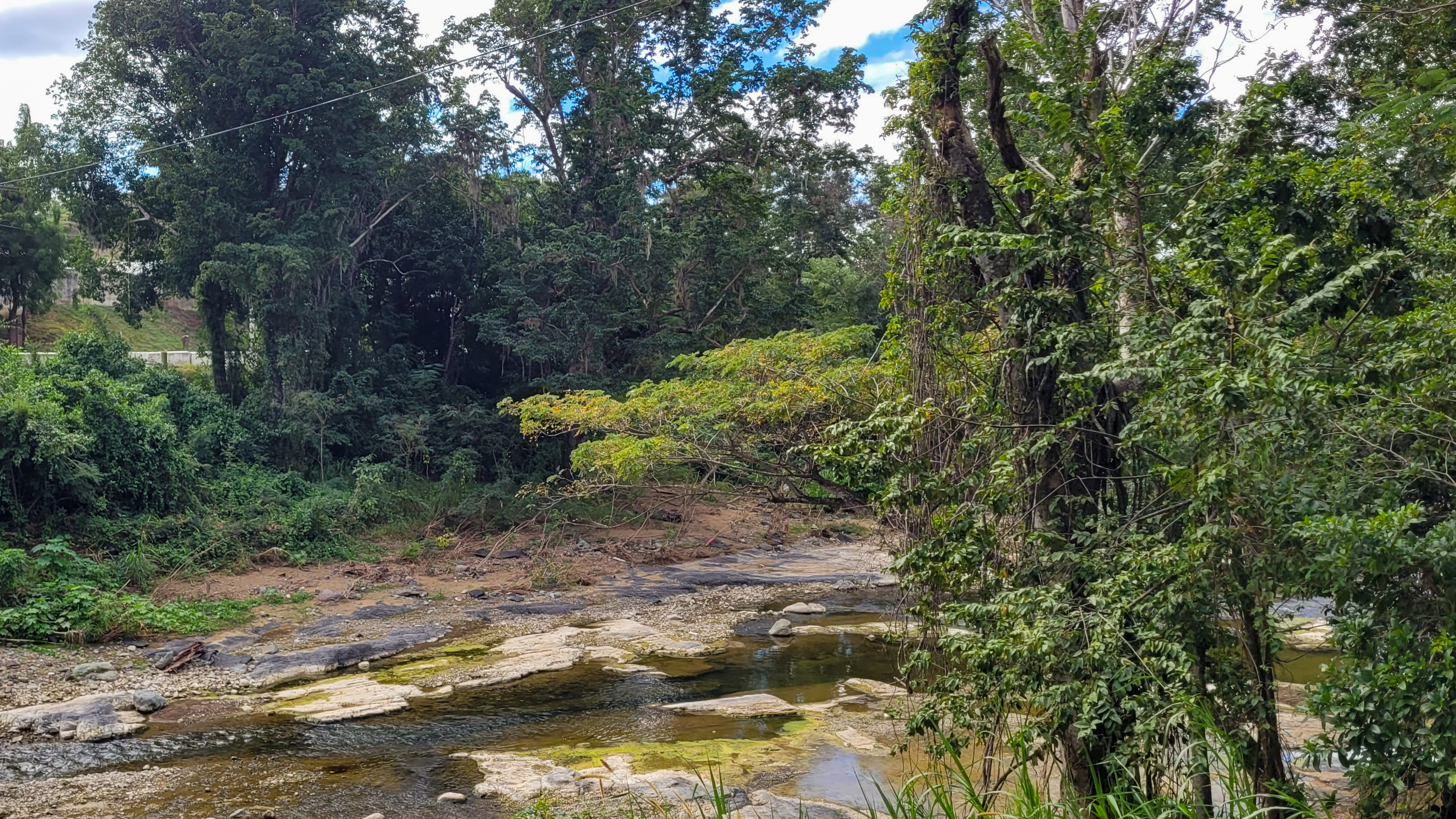
Río Cuyón

- Río Loco
  - Río Cañas
- Río Yauco
  - Río Duey
  - Río Naranjo
  - Río Chiquito
- Río Guayanilla
- Río Macaná
- Río Tallaboa
  - Río Guayanés
- Río Matilde
  - Río Cañas
  - Río Pastillo
- Río Portugués
  - Río Chiquito
  - Río Corcho
- Río Bucaná
  - Río Bayagán
  - Río Cerrillos
    - Río San Patricio
    - Río Prieto
- Río Inabón
  - Río Guayo
  - Río Anón
- Río Jacaguas
  - Río Toa Vaca
- Río Cañas
- Río Descalabrado
- Río Coamo
  - Río de la Mina
    - Río del Pasto
  - Río Cuyón
- Río Cayures
- Río Jueyes
- Río Nigua (Río Salina)
  - Río Majada
    - Río Lapa
    - Río Jájome
- Río Seco
- Río Guamaní
- Río Nigua
- Río Grande de Patillas
  - Río Marín
- Río Chico
  - Río de Apeadero
- Río Jacaboa
- Río Maunabo
  - Río Lachi

=== West Coast (Mona Passage) ===
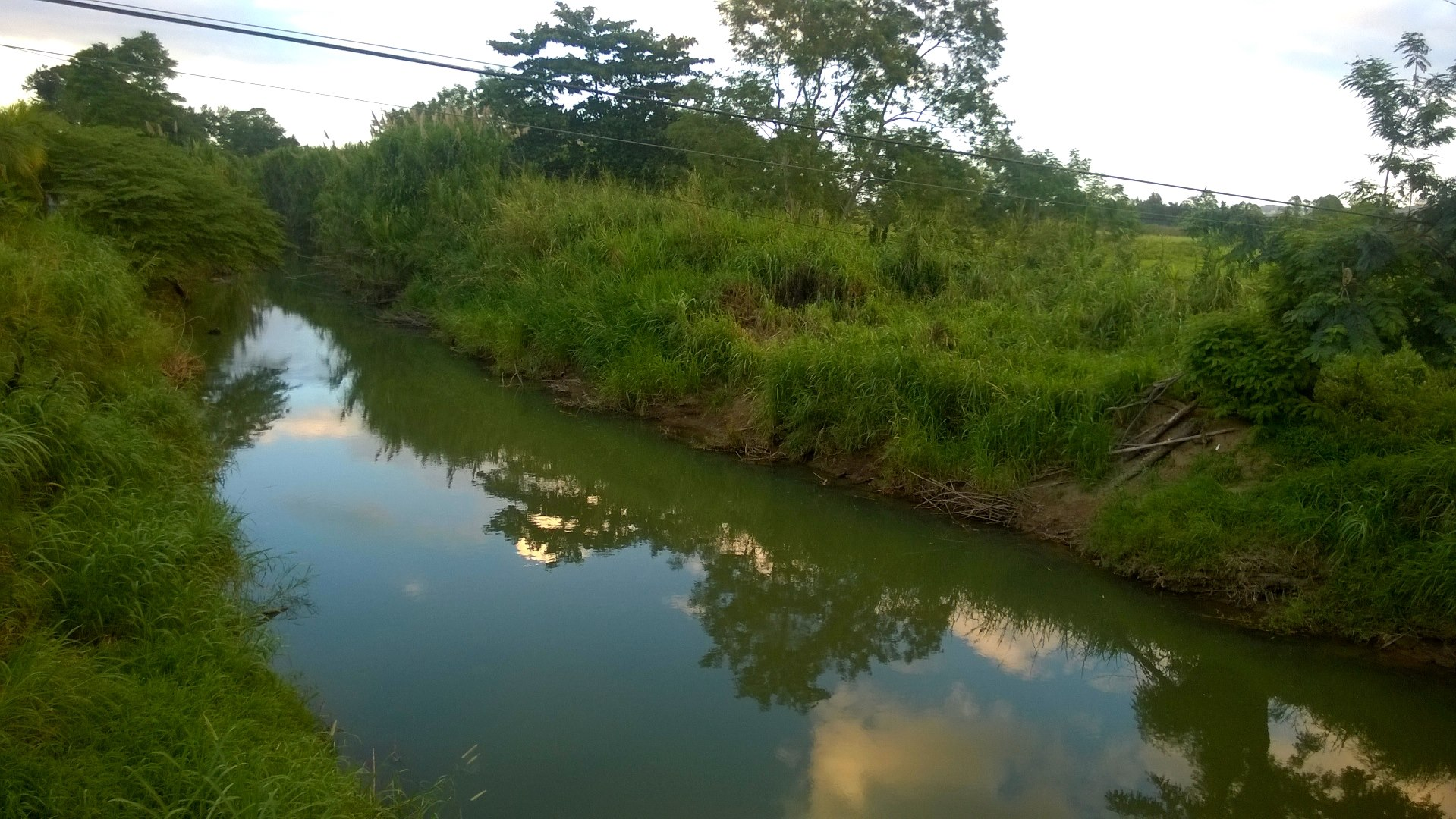
Río Culebrinas

- Río Culebrinas
  - Río Cañas
  - Río Guatemala
  - Río Juncal
- Río Guayabo
  - Río Culebra
  - Río Ingenio
- Río Grande
- Río Hondo
- Río Grande de Añasco
  - Río Dagüey
  - Río Cañas
  - Río Casei
  - Río Humata
  - Río Sonador
  - Río Arenas
  - Río Guabá
    - Río Bonelli
      - Río Postrero
  - Río Blanco
    - Río Guilarte
    - Río Limaní
      - Río Yahuecas
  - Río Prieto
    - Río Toro
      - Río Sapo
- Río Yagüez
- Río Guanajibo
  - Río Hondo
  - Río Rosario
    - Río Prieto
    - Río Maricao
  - Río Viejo
  - Río Hoconuco
    - Río Duey
      - Río Nueve Pasos
  - Río Caín
  - Río Cupeyes
  - Río Cruces
  - Río Flores
  - Río Grande
  - Río Coco

== Alphabetically ==
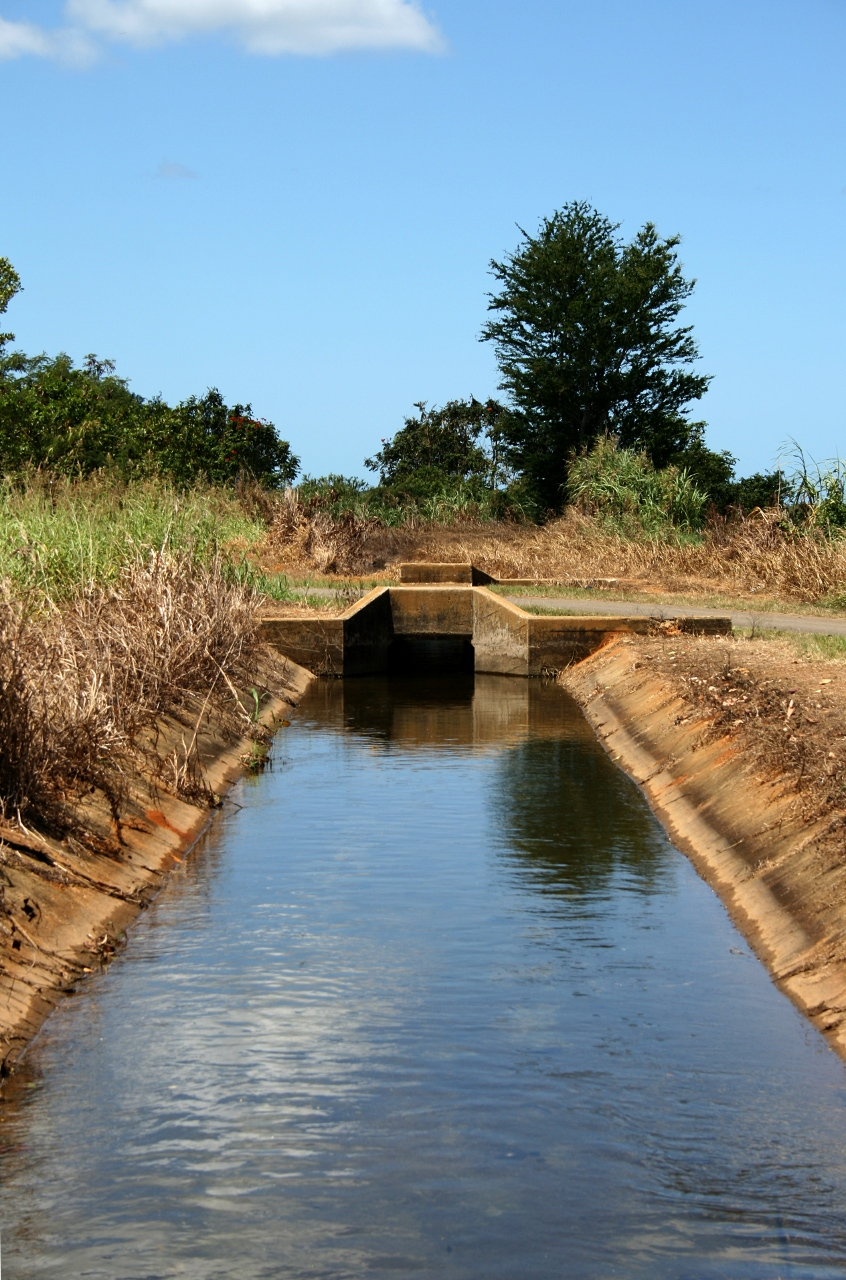
A waterway in Puerto Rico

- Caño de Santiago
- Río Ángeles
- Río Anón
- Río Antón Ruiz
- Río Arenas (Las Marías)
- Río Arenas (Yabucoa)
- Río Arroyata
- Río Bairoa
- Río Barbas
- Río Bauta
- Río Bayagán
- Río Bayamón
- Río Blanco (Naguabo)
- Río Blanco (Ponce)
- Río Bonelli
- Río Botijas
- Río Bucaná
- Río Bucarabones
- Río Cagüitas
- Río Caín
- Río Caliente
- Río Camándulas
- Río Camuy
- Río Cañabón
- Río Cañaboncito
- Río Cañas (Aguada)
- Río Cañas (Caguas)
- Río Cañas (Juana Díaz)
- Río Cañas (Mayagüez)
- Río Cañas (Naranjito)
- Río Cañas (Ponce)
- Río Cañas (Sabana Grande)
- Río Candelero
- Río Canóvanas
- Río Canovanillas
- Río Caonillas
- Río Caricaboa
- Río Casei
- Río Cayaguas
- Río Cayures
- Río Cerrillos
- Río Chico
- Río Chiquito (Ponce)
- Río Chiquito (Yauco)
- Río Chiquito de Cibao
- Río Cialitos
- Río Cibuco
- Río Cidra
- Río Clavijo
- Río Coabey
- Río Coamo
- Río Cocal
- Río Coco
- Río Corcho
- Río Corozal
- Río Criminales
- Río Cruces
- Río Cubuy (Canóvanas)
- Río Cubuy (Naguabo)
- Río Cuesta Arriba
- Río Culebra (Aguada)
- Río Culebra (Orocovis)
- Río Culebrinas
- Río Cupeyes
- Río Cuyón
- Río Daguao
- Río Dagüey
- Río de Aibonito
- Río de Apeadero
- Río de Barranquitas
- Río de Caguana
- Río de Caguanita
- Río de la Ciénaga
- Río de la Mina (Coamo)
- Río de la Mina (Río Grande)
- Río de la Plata
- Río de las Vacas
- Río de las Vegas
- Río del Cristal
- Río del Ingenio
- Río del Pasto
- Río Demajagua
- Río Descalabrado
- Río Dos Bocas
- Río Duey
- Río Emajagua
- Río Espíritu Santo
- Río Fajardo
- Río Flores
- Río Frío
- Río Garzas
- Río Grande
- Río Grande de Añasco
- Río Grande de Arecibo
- Río Grande de Jayuya
- Río Grande de Loíza
- Río Grande de Manatí
- Río Grande de Patillas
- Río Guabá
- Río Guadiana
- Río Guajataca
- Río Guamaní
- Río Guanajibo
- Río Guaonica
- Río Guatemala
- Río Guavate
- Río Guayabo
- Río Guayanes
- Río Guayanilla
- Río Guaynabo
- Río Guayo
- Río Guilarte
- Río Gurabo
- Río Herrera
- Río Hoconuco
- Río Hondo
- Río Humacao
- Río Humata
- Río Icacos
- Río Inabón
- Río Indio
- Río Ingenio
- Río Jacaboa
- Río Jacaguas
- Río Jájome
- Río Jauca
- Río Juan Martín
- Río Jueyes
- Río Juncal
- Río La Venta
- Río Lachi
- Río Lajas
- Río Lapa
- Río Limaní
- Río Limón
- Río Limones
- Río Loco
- Río Macaná
- Río Majada
- Río Mameyes
- Río Maricao
- Río Marín
- Río Matilde
- Río Matón
- Río Matrullas
- Río Maunabo
- Río Mavilla
- Río Minillas
- Río Morovis
- Río Naranjito
- Río Naranjo
- Río Nigua (Arroyo)
- Río Nigua (Salinas)
- Río Nueve Pasos
- Río Nuevo
- Río Orocovis
- Río Palmarejo
- Río Pastillo
- Río Pellejas
- Río Piedras (San Juan)
- Río Piedras (Utuado)
- Río Pitahaya
- Río Portugués
- Río Postrero
- Río Prieto (Lares, Puerto Rico)
- Río Prieto (Maricao, Puerto Rico)
- Río Prieto (Naguabo, Puerto Rico)
- Río Prieto (Ponce, Puerto Rico)
- Río Prieto (Yabucoa, Puerto Rico)
- Río Puerto Nuevo
- Río Roncador
- Río Rosario
- Río Sabana
- Río Saliente
- Río Salientito
- Río Saltillo
- Río San Patricio
- Río Sana Muerto
- Río Santiago
- Río Sapo
- Río Seco
- Río Sonador
- Río Tallaboa
- Río Tanamá
- Río Toa Vaca
- Río Toro Negro
- Río Toro
- Río Turabo
- Río Unibón
- Río Usabón
- Río Valenciano
- Río Veguitas
- Río Viejo
- Río Viví
- Río Yagüez
- Río Yahuecas
- Río Yauco
- Río Yunes
- Río Zamas

== See also ==
- List of rivers in U.S. insular areas
- List of rivers of Ponce, Puerto Rico
- List of dams and reservoirs in Puerto Rico
- List of cays and islets of Puerto Rico
