= Caricaboa River =

River of Puerto Rico

Coordinates: 18.2182896°N 66.5901729°W

- Native name: Río Caricaboa (Spanish)

Location
- Commonwealth: Puerto Rico
- Municipality: Jayuya

Physical characteristics
- Source
  - location: Piedra Blanca in Veguitas, Jayuya
- Mouth
  - location: Jayuya River in Jayuya Pueblo

Basin features
- Tributaries
  - left: Veguitas River

The Caricaboa River (Spanish: Río Caricaboa) is a tributary of the Jayuya River (Río Grande de Jayuya) that flows through the municipality of Jayuya, Puerto Rico. Its source lies on the north face of Piedra Blanca, one of the highest peaks of the Cordillera Central. It flows north towards the downtown area of Jayuya (Jayuya Pueblo) where it meets the Jayuya River.

== See also ==
- List of rivers of Puerto Rico
