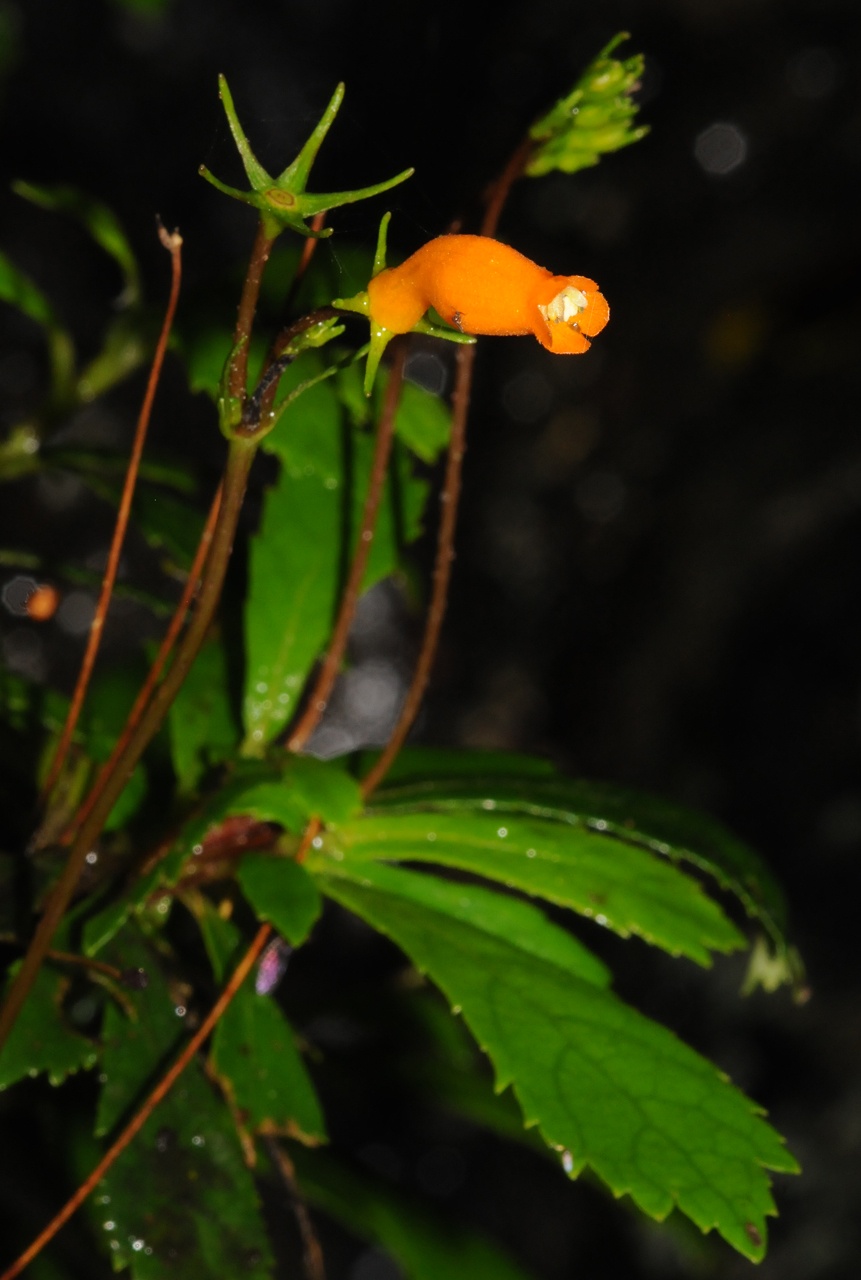

Conservation status
- Threatened (ESA)

Scientific classification
- Kingdom: Plantae
- Clade: Tracheophytes
- Clade: Angiosperms
- Clade: Eudicots
- Clade: Asterids
- Order: Lamiales
- Family: Gesneriaceae
- Genus: Gesneria
- Species: G. pauciflora

Binomial name
- Gesneria pauciflora Urb.

= Gesneria pauciflora =

Species of flowering plant

Gesneria pauciflora is a rare species of flowering plant in the family Gesneriaceae known by the common name yerba maricao de cueva. It is endemic to Puerto Rico, where there are only three populations remaining. It was federally listed as a threatened species of the United States in 1995.

This is a small shrub with dark green, glossy leaves and tubular orange or yellowish flowers around 2 centimeters long. It grows in wet forested habitat within the Maricao Commonwealth Forest of Puerto Rico. It grows along the Maricao River, Seco River, and a tributary of the Lajas River in rocky serpentine soils. The plants may grow within the stream bed between the black or greenish serpentine rocks and in the gravel. At times, the plant is submerged in high water. The plant is gregarious, growing in colonial mats. The plants flower throughout the year, with most flowering occurring during the rainy season in August, September, and October.

Threats to the species include forest management practices such as trail construction, and erosion, landslides, and other forces that affect the habitat. The specific epithet pauciflora is Latin for 'few-flowered'.
