= Bonelli River =

River of Puerto Rico

Coordinates: 18.1824568°N 66.9582331°W

- Native name: Río Bonelli (Spanish)

Location
- Commonwealth: Puerto Rico
- Municipality: Maricao

Physical characteristics
- Source
  - location: Cerro Santa Ana in Maricao Afuera, Maricao
  - elevation: 1070 ft.
- Mouth
  - location: Guabá River in Indiera Fría, Maricao

Basin features
- Tributaries
  - right: Lajas River

The Bonelli River (Spanish: Río Bonelli) is a tributary of the Guabá River of Maricao, Puerto Rico. The Bonelli has its source on the north face of Cerro Santa Ana, also known as Monte del Estado, within the Maricao State Forest. The river is one of many that form part of the hydrological region of the Maricao rainforest ecosystem.

== See also ==
- List of rivers of Puerto Rico
