= Juan Martín =

Juan Martín may refer to:

== People ==
- Juan Martín (guitarist) (born 1948), Spanish flamenco guitarist
- Juan Carlos Martín (born 1967), Spanish cyclist
- Juan Martín (footballer) (born 1982), Argentine football forward
- Juan Martín (politician) (born 1987), Argentine lawyer and politician

== Places ==
- Juan Martín River, river in Puerto Rico
- Juan Martín, Yabucoa, Puerto Rico, barrio in the municipality of Yabucoa, Puerto Rico
- Juan Martín, Luquillo, Puerto Rico, barrio in the municipality of Luquillo, Puerto Rico

== See also ==
- Juan San Martín (born 1994), Uruguayan football forward
