= Maunabo =

Maunabo may refer to:

- Maunabo, Puerto Rico, a municipality of Puerto Rico
- Maunabo barrio-pueblo, the administrative center of Maunabo, Puerto Rico
- Maunabo River, in Puerto Rico
- Maunabo Leones, a Puerto Rican soccer team
