= Dos Bocas =

Dos Bocas may refer to the following places:

- Dos Bocas, Tabasco, a port in Mexico
  - Dos Bocas Refinery
- Dos Bocas, Corozal, Puerto Rico, a barrio
  - Dos Bocas River
- Dos Bocas, Trujillo Alto, Puerto Rico, a barrio
- Dos Bocas Lake
