= Cayaguas River =

River of Puerto Rico

Coordinates: 18.1744027°N 65.9626637°W

- Native name: Río Cayaguas (Spanish)

Location
- Commonwealth: Puerto Rico
- Municipality: San Lorenzo

Physical characteristics
- Source
  - location: Cerro La Pintora in Quebrada Arenas, San Lorenzo
- Mouth
  - location: Loíza River in Cayaguas, San Lorenzo
  - elevation: 259 ft.

Basin features
- Tributaries
  - left: Las Vegas River

The Cayaguas River (Spanish: Río Cayaguas) is one of the main tributaries of the Loíza River (Río Grande de Loíza) that flows through the municipality of San Lorenzo in Puerto Rico.

== See also ==
- List of rivers of Puerto Rico
