= Caliente River (Puerto Rico) =

River of Puerto Rico

Coordinates: 18.2224560°N 66.2782242°W

- Native name: Río Caliente (Spanish)

Location
- Commonwealth: Puerto Rico
- Municipality: Barranquitas

Physical characteristics
- Source
  - location: Cordillera Central in Quebradillas, Barranquitas
- Mouth
  - location: Frío River in Quebradillas, Barranquitas
  - elevation: 1506 ft.

The Caliente River (Spanish: Río Caliente) is a tributary of the Frío River that flows through the municipality of Barranquitas, Puerto Rico. These two rivers (whose names translate from Spanish into "hot" and "cold rivers", respectively) form part of the hydrological system that creates Las Bocas Canyon, one of the numerous gorges of the La Plata basin, of which the San Cristóbal Canyon is another example.

== See also ==
- List of rivers of Puerto Rico
