= Arenas River (Yabucoa, Puerto Rico) =

River of Puerto Rico

Coordinates: 18.0769076°N 65.9482188°W

- Native name: Río Arenas (Spanish)

Location
- Commonwealth: Puerto Rico
- Municipality: Yabucoa

Physical characteristics
- Source
  - location: Sierra Pandura in Guayabota, Yabucoa
  - elevation: 1,092 ft
- Mouth
  - location: Guayanés River in Guayabota, Yabucoa
  - elevation: 728 ft

The Arenas River (Spanish: Río Arenas) is a tributary of the Guayanés River of Yabucoa, Puerto Rico. The river has its source in the northern slope of the Sierra Pandura in Guayabota barrio, close to the municipal border with Maunabo, and flows northward into the Guayanés also in Guayabota barrio.

== See also ==
- List of rivers in Puerto Rico
