= Nigua River =

Nigua River may refer to:

- Nigua River (Salinas, Puerto Rico)
- Nigua River (Arroyo, Puerto Rico)
