= Caño de Santiago =

River of Puerto Rico

Coordinates: 18.0577429°N 65.8265502°W

Santiago Channel
- Native name: Caño de Santiago (Spanish)

Location
- Commonwealth: Puerto Rico
- Municipality: Yabucoa

Physical characteristics
- Source
  - elevation: 7 ft.
- Mouth
  - location: Yabucoa Bay in Playa, Yabucoa
  - elevation: 0 ft

The Santiago Channel (Spanish: Caño de Santiago) is a natural drainage channel in Yabucoa, Puerto Rico. It is located in the Playa barrio of Yabucoa, and it forms part of the Guayanés River basin of the Yabucoa Valley.

A bridge of highway route PR-9910 crosses the Santiago Channel.

== See also ==
- List of rivers of Puerto Rico
