= Minillas =

Minillas may refer to the following places:

- Minillas, Bayamón, Puerto Rico, a barrio
- Minillas, San Germán, Puerto Rico, a barrio
- Minillas (Santurce), a subbarrio of Santurce barrio in San Juan municipality in Puerto Rico
- Minillas Tunnel in Puerto Rico
- Minillas River in Puerto Rico
