= Cañas River (Sabana Grande, Puerto Rico) =

River of Puerto Rico

Coordinates: 18.0335750°N 66.8890652°W

Location
- Commonwealth: Puerto Rico
- Municipality: Sabana Grande

Physical characteristics
- Source
  - location: Montalvo in Torre, Sabana Grande
- Mouth
  - location: Loco River in Susúa, Sabana Grande

The Cañas River (Spanish: Río Cañas) is a tributary of the Loco River that flows between the municipalities of Sabana Grande and Yauco in Puerto Rico. The river has its source in the forested hills near the Montalvo community within the Susúa State Forest.

== See also ==
- List of rivers of Puerto Rico
