= Palmarejo =

Palmarejo can mean the following geographic objects:

- Palmarejo, Cape Verde, a subdivision of Praia, Cape Verde
- Palmarejo, Coamo, Puerto Rico, a barrio in Puerto Rico
- Palmarejo, Corozal, Puerto Rico, a barrio in Puerto Rico
- Palmarejo, Lajas, Puerto Rico, a barrio in Puerto Rico
- Palmarejo River, a river in Puerto Rico
