= Bucarabones River =

River of Puerto Rico

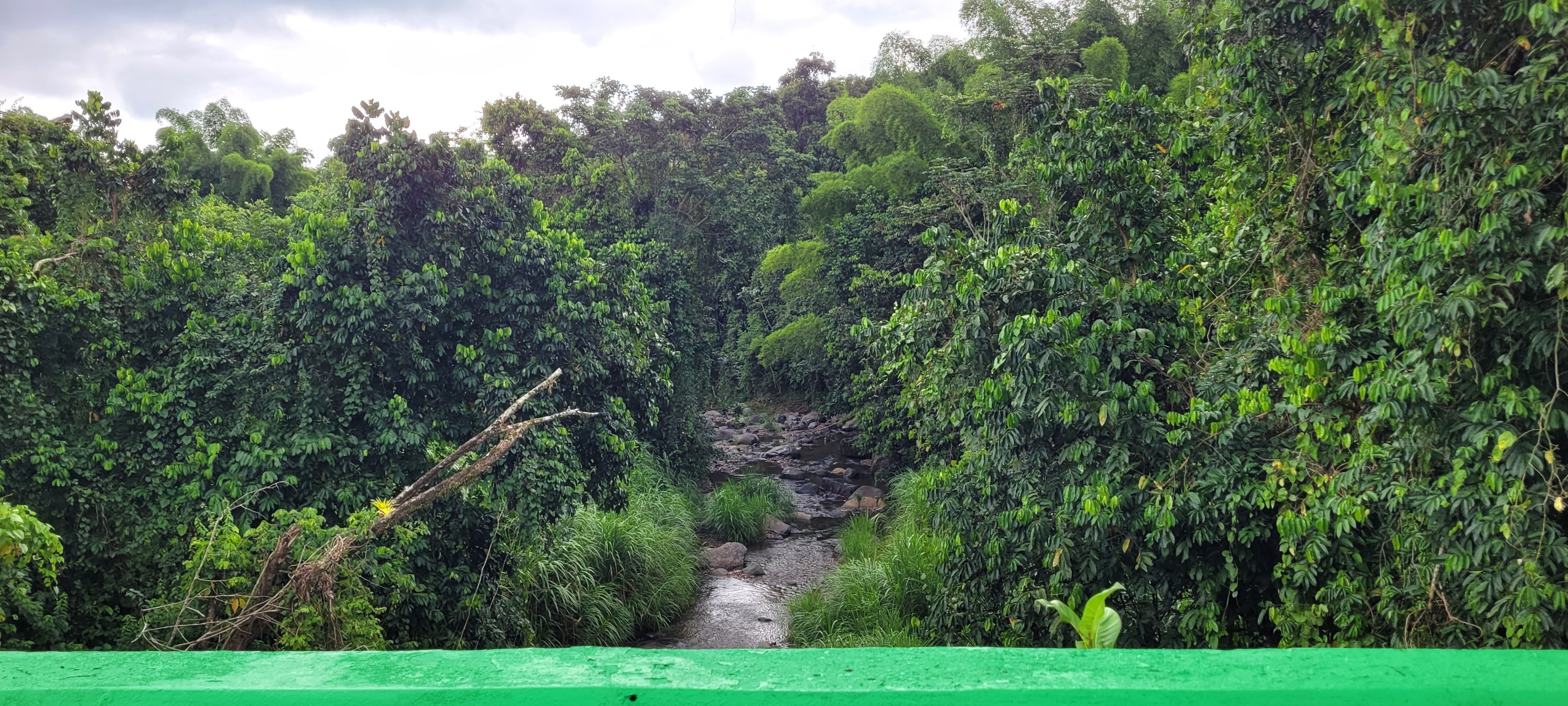
- Bucarabones River from Puerto Rico Highway 409
- Native name: Río Bucarabones (Spanish)

Location
- Commonwealth: Puerto Rico
- Municipality: Maricao

Physical characteristics
- Source
  - location: Cuchilla de Bucarabones in Indiera Baja, Maricao
  - coordinates: 18.2230108°N 66.9437885°W
- Mouth
  - location: Guabá River in Bucarabones, Las Marías

The Bucarabones River (Spanish: Río Bucarabones) is a tributary of the Guabá River, located in the municipalities of Maricao and Las Marías, Puerto Rico. The river has its source in the Cuchilla de Bucarabones area of Maricao and flows northward into the Guabá River in Las Marías.

== See also ==
- List of rivers of Puerto Rico
