= Camándulas River =

River of Puerto Rico

Coordinates: 18.3055095°N 65.7246066°W

- Native name: Río Camándulas (Spanish)

Location
- Commonwealth: Puerto Rico
- Municipality: Luquillo

Physical characteristics
- Source
  - location: Sierra de Luquillo in Sabana, Luquillo
- Mouth
  - location: El Cristal River in Sabana, Luquillo
  - elevation: 886 ft.

The Camándulas River (Spanish: Río Camándulas) is a tributary of El Cristal River, which flows through the Sierra de Luquillo in the Sabana barrio of the municipality of Luquillo, Puerto Rico. El Cristal River itself is also a tributary of the Pitahaya River, one of the primary streams of El Yunque rainforest.

== See also ==
- List of rivers of Puerto Rico
