= Río Grande de Patillas =

River of Puerto Rico

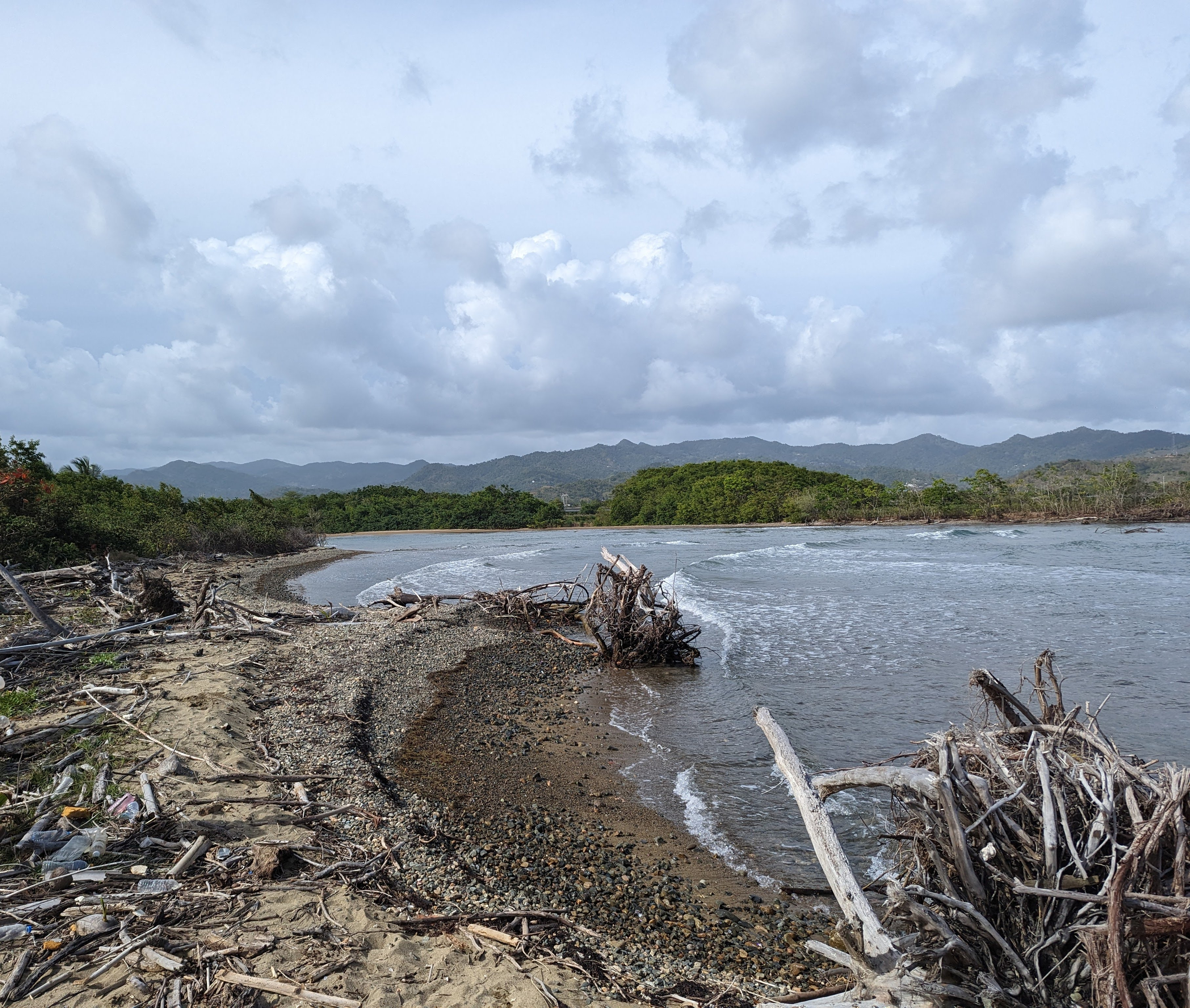
- The mouth of the river

Location
- Commonwealth: Puerto Rico
- Municipality: Patillas

Physical characteristics
- Source
  - coordinates: 17.9794111°N 66.0162749°W
- Length: 14 mi (22 km)

The Río Grande de Patillas is a river of Patillas, Puerto Rico. It has a length of 14 mi (22 km). Its tributaries are the Marín River and the Guano, Quebrada Arriba, Sonadora, Farallón, and Mulas streams.

== See also ==
- List of rivers of Puerto Rico
