= Río Juncal =

River of Puerto Rico

Coordinates: 18.2927300°N 66.9229550°W

Location
- Commonwealth: Puerto Rico
- Municipality: San Sebastián

Physical characteristics
- Source
  - elevation: 663 ft.

The Río Juncal is a river of San Sebastián and Lares, Puerto Rico.

== See also ==
- List of rivers of Puerto Rico
