= Cupeyes River =

River of Puerto Rico

Coordinates: 18.0763500°N 67.0090668°W

- Native name: Río Cupeyes (Spanish)

Location
- Commonwealth: Puerto Rico
- Municipality: San Germán

Rio Cupeyes video by NEON
- Río Cupeyes Stream Site by the National Ecological Observatory Network
- https://www.youtube.com/watch?v=ueHXjuJ20_w

The Cupeyes River (Spanish: Río Cupeyes) is a river of San Germán, Puerto Rico.

== See also ==
- List of rivers of Puerto Rico
