= Guilarte River =

River of Puerto Rico

Coordinates: 18.1985678°N 66.7968420°W

- Native name: Río Guilarte (Spanish)

Location
- Commonwealth: Puerto Rico
- Municipality: Adjuntas

Physical characteristics
- Source
  - elevation: 1585 ft

The Guilarte River (Spanish: Río Guilarte) is a river of Adjuntas, Puerto Rico.

== See also ==
- List of rivers of Puerto Rico
