= Guaonica River =

River of Puerto Rico

Coordinates: 18.2566210°N 66.7243410°W

- Native name: Río Guaonica (Spanish)

Location
- Commonwealth: Puerto Rico
- Municipality: Utuado

Physical characteristics
- Source
  - elevation: 486 ft

The Guaonica River (Spanish: Río Guaonica) is a river of Utuado, Puerto Rico.

== See also ==
- List of rivers of Puerto Rico
