= Yunes River =

River of Puerto Rico

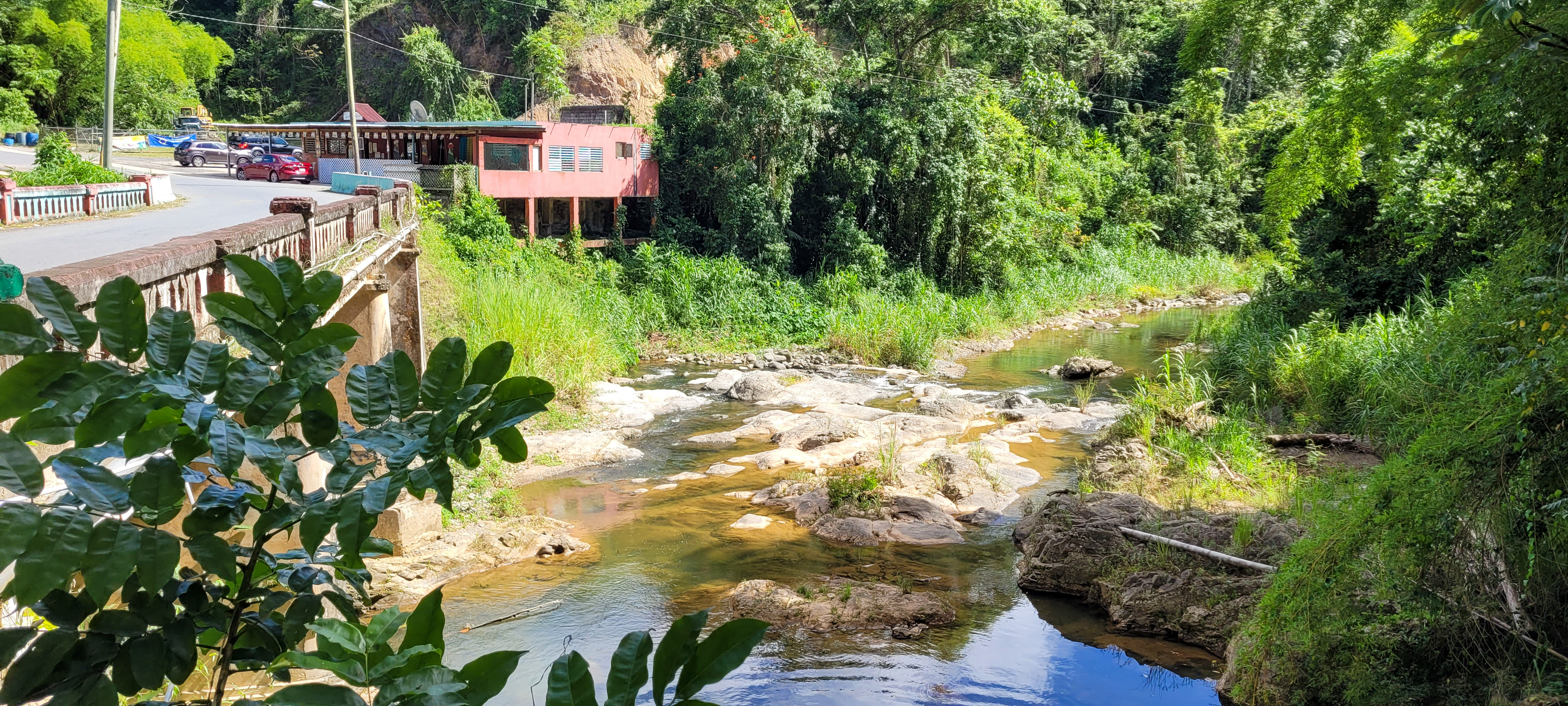
- Río Yunes between Ciales and Utuado
- Native name: Río Yunes (Spanish)

Location
- Commonwealth: Puerto Rico
- Municipality: Utuado

Physical characteristics
- Source
  - coordinates: 18.3224512°N 66.6112843°W
  - elevation: 354 feet

The Yunes River (Spanish: Río Yunes) is a river in Utuado and Jayuya, Puerto Rico.

== See also ==
- List of rivers of Puerto Rico
