= Cruces River (Puerto Rico) =

River of Puerto Rico

Coordinates: 18.0707949°N 66.9873998°W

- Native name: Río Cruces (Spanish)

Location
- Commonwealth: Puerto Rico
- Municipality: Sabana Grande

Physical characteristics
- Source
  - elevation: 217 ft.

The Cruces River (Spanish: Río Cruces) is a river of Sabana Grande and San Germán in Puerto Rico.

== See also ==
- List of rivers of Puerto Rico
