= Ingenio River =

River of Puerto Rico

Coordinates: 18.3816131°N 67.2076810°W

Location
- Commonwealth: Puerto Rico

The Ingenio River is a river of Puerto Rico.

== See also ==
- List of rivers of Puerto Rico
