= Herrera River =

River of Puerto Rico

Coordinates: 18.4232805°N 65.8290527°W

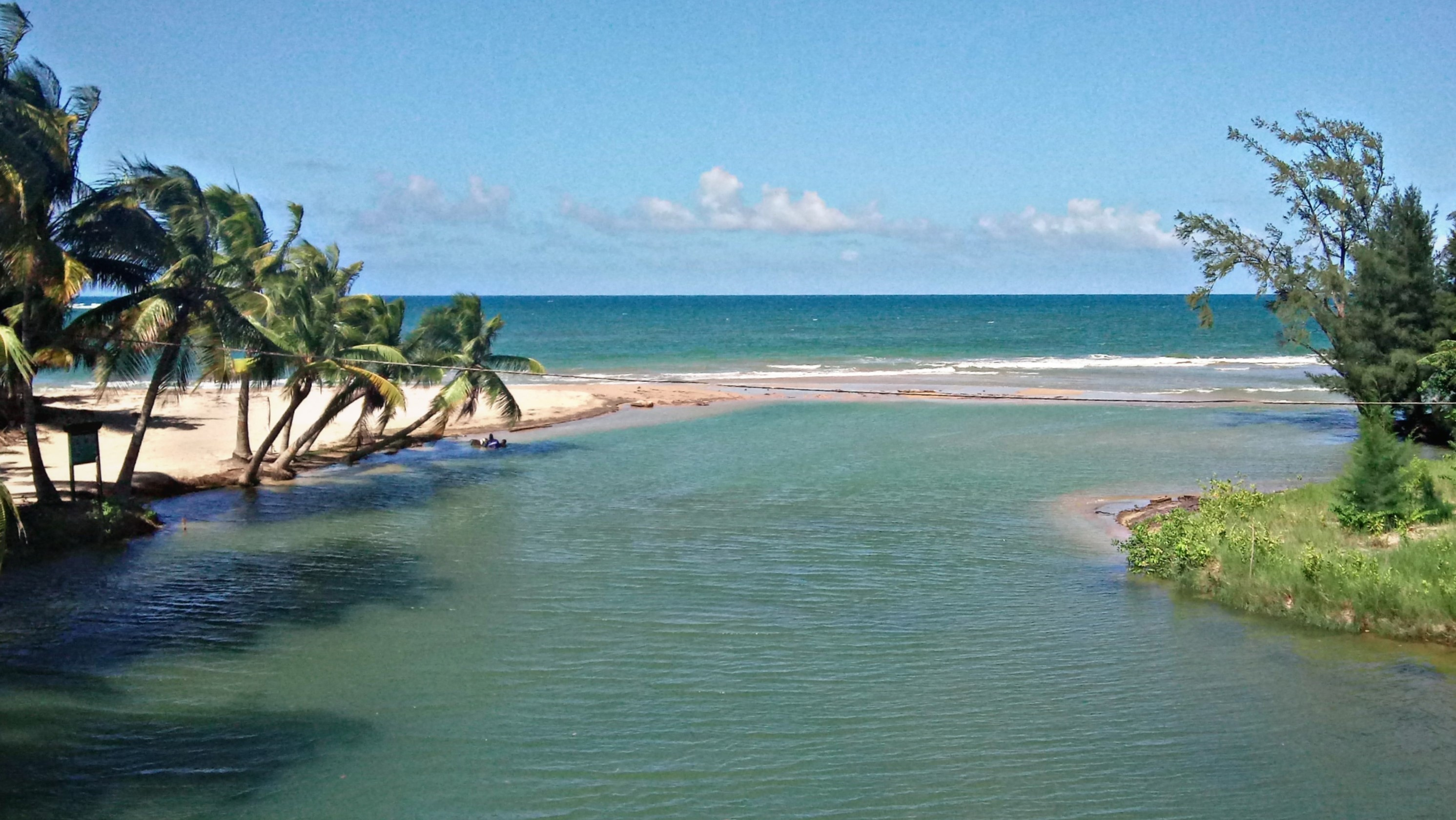
- River mouth in Herreras
- Native name: Río Herrera (Spanish)

Location
- Commonwealth: Puerto Rico
- Municipality: Río Grande

Physical characteristics
- Source
  - elevation: 1558 ft
- Mouth
  - location: Herreras, Río Grande, Puerto Rico

The Herrera River (Spanish: Río Herrera) is a river of Río Grande, Puerto Rico. It begins at barrio Ciénaga Alta, in Río Grande and travels through Loiza, Puerto Rico, another municipality. It begins at an elevation of 1,558 feet (475 meters) above sea level. It has an approximate length of 10 miles (16 kilometers) from its source until it empties into the Atlantic Ocean north of Puerto Rico between the towns of Loíza and Río Grande. It runs generally from south to north.

== See also ==
- List of rivers of Puerto Rico
