= Viejo River (Puerto Rico) =

River of Puerto Rico

Coordinates: 18.1244027°N 67.1351795°W

- Native name: Río Viejo (Spanish)

Location
- Commonwealth: Puerto Rico
- Municipality: Cabo Rojo

The Viejo River (Spanish: Río Viejo) is a river of Cabo Rojo and San Germán, Puerto Rico.

== See also ==
- List of rivers of Puerto Rico
