= Río Sabana =

River of Puerto Rico

Coordinates: 18.1732915°N 66.1493333°W

Location
- Commonwealth: Puerto Rico
- Municipality: Cidra

Physical characteristics
- Source
  - elevation: 1325 ft.

Río Sabana is a river of Cidra, Puerto Rico.

== See also ==
- List of rivers of Puerto Rico
