= Toa Vaca River =

River of Puerto Rico

Coordinates: 18.0999611°N 66.4890608°W

- Native name: Río Toa Vaca (Spanish)

Location
- Commonwealth: Puerto Rico
- Municipality: Villalba

Physical characteristics
- Source
  - elevation: 538 ft.

The Río Toa Vaca (Spanish: Río Toa Vaca) is a river of Villalba and Coamo, Puerto Rico.

== See also ==
- List of rivers of Puerto Rico
