= Cocal River =

River of Puerto Rico

Coordinates: 18.4680007°N 66.1982227°W

- Native name: Río Cocal (Spanish)

Location
- Commonwealth: Puerto Rico
- Municipality: Dorado

The Cocal River (Spanish: Río Cocal) is a river of Dorado and Toa Baja in Puerto Rico.

== See also ==
- List of rivers of Puerto Rico
