= Postrero River =

River of Puerto Rico

Coordinates: 18.1632910°N 66.9551776°W

Location
- Commonwealth: Puerto Rico

The Postrero River is a river of Puerto Rico.

== See also ==
- List of rivers of Puerto Rico
