= Guayanilla River =

River of Puerto Rico

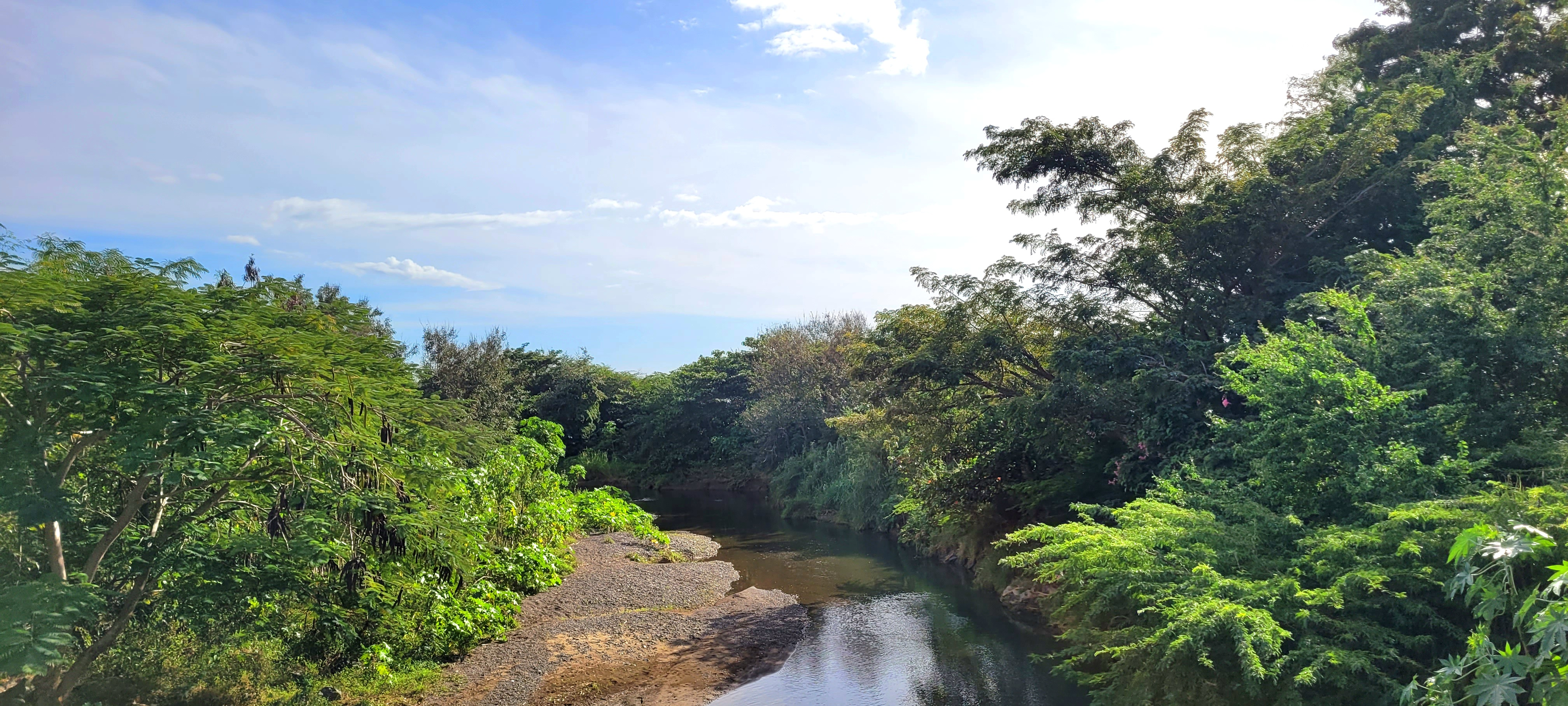
- Guayanilla River from Puerto Rico Highway 3336

- Native name: Río Guayanilla (Spanish)

Location
- Commonwealth: Puerto Rico
- Municipality: Guayanilla

Physical characteristics
- Source
  - coordinates: 18.0019101°N 66.7746195°W

The Guayanilla River (Spanish: Río Guayanilla) is a river of Guayanilla, Puerto Rico.

== USACE project ==
In mid 2018, the United States Army Corps of Engineers announced it had earmarked $3 million to study and research the river.

== See also ==
- List of rivers of Puerto Rico
- Monte Guilarte
