= Río Grande (Puerto Rico) =

River of Puerto Rico

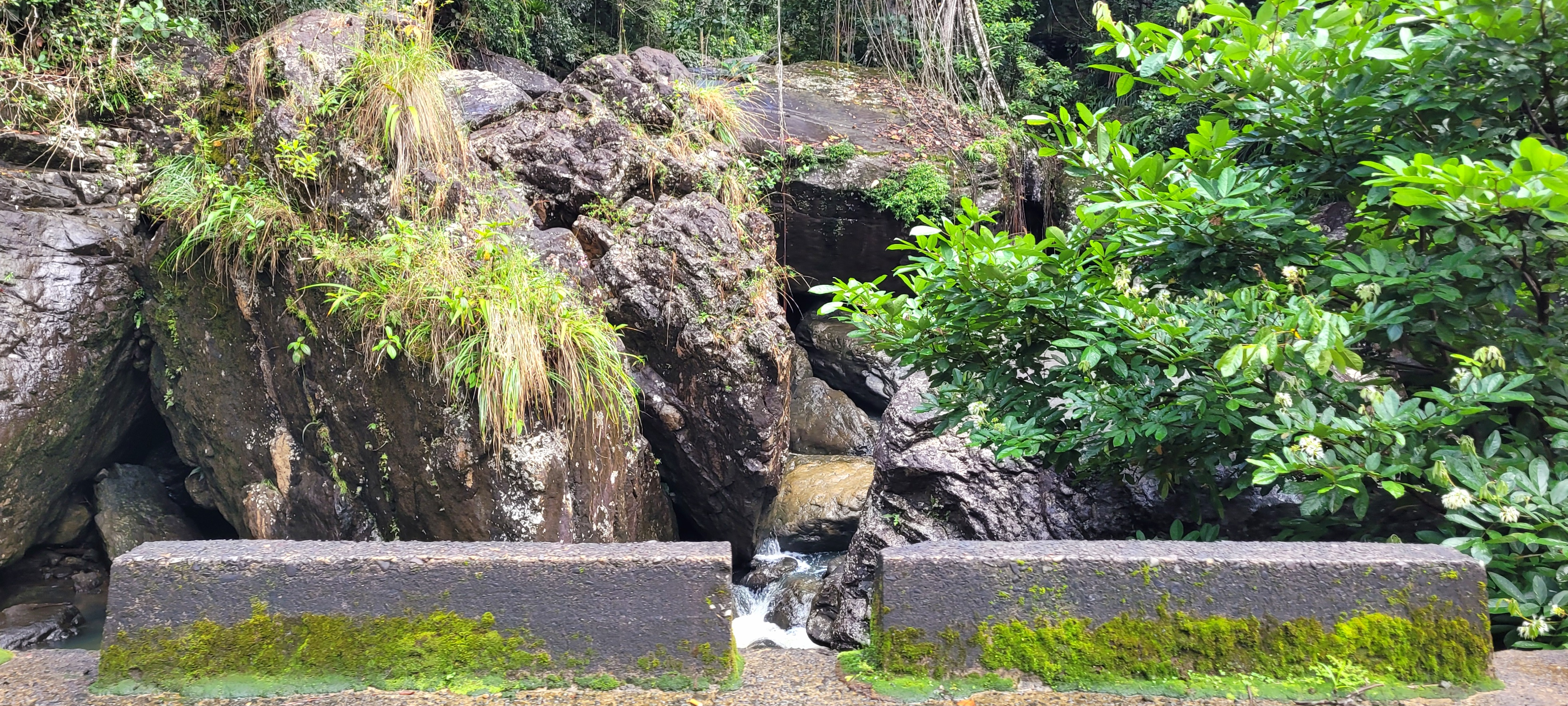
- Río Grande from Puerto Rico Highway 186

Location
- Commonwealth: Puerto Rico
- Municipality: Río Grande

Physical characteristics
- Source
  - coordinates: 18.3791160°N 65.8243303°W

The Río Grande is a river in the U.S. commonwealth of Puerto Rico that flows through the El Yunque National Forest and the town of Río Grande.

== See also ==
- Rivers in Puerto Rico
