= Guaynabo River =

River of Puerto Rico

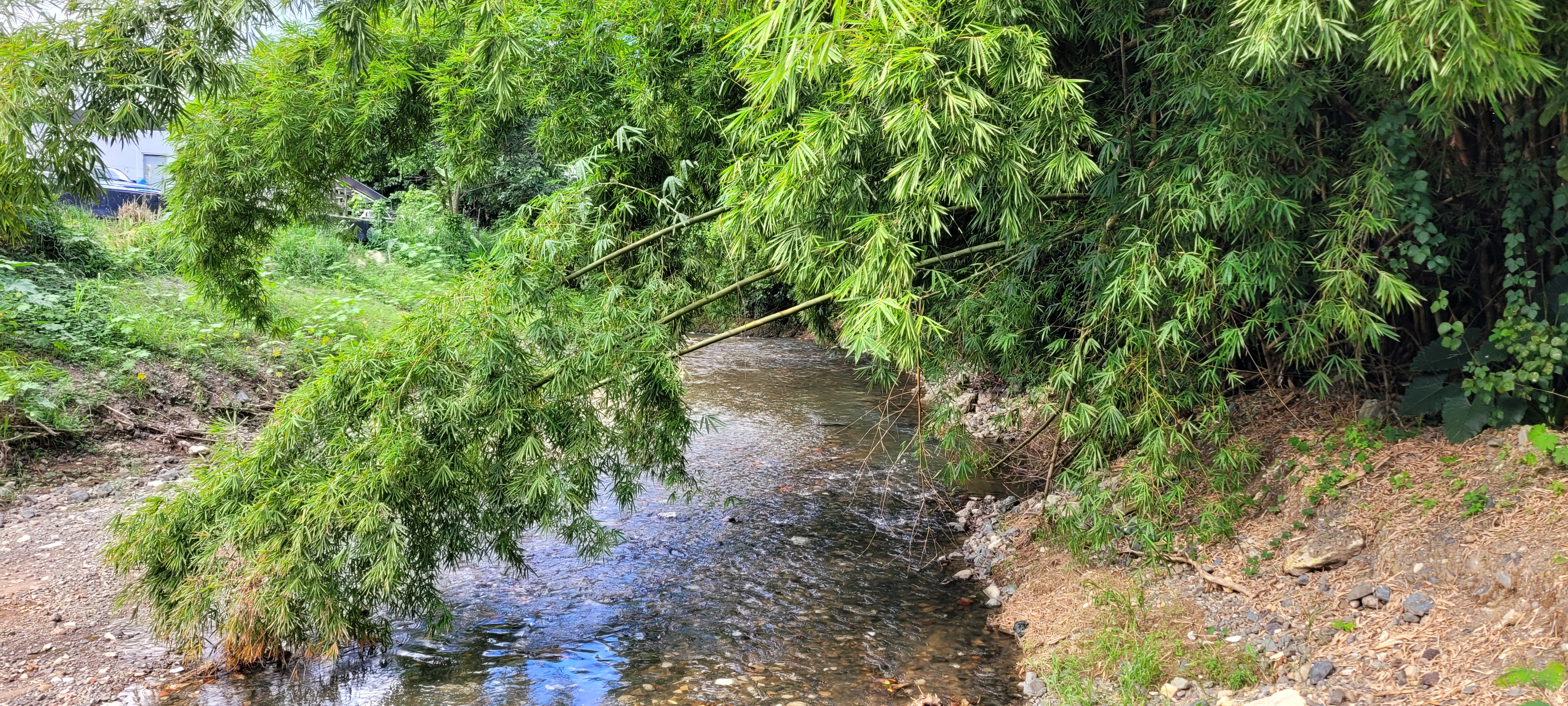
- Guaynabo River between Río and Mamey barrios

- Native name: Río Guaynabo (Spanish)

Location
- Commonwealth: Puerto Rico
- Municipality: Guaynabo

Physical characteristics
- Source
  - coordinates: 18.3743940°N 66.1346111°W
  - elevation: 46 ft

The Guaynabo River (Spanish: Río Guaynabo) is a river of Guaynabo, Puerto Rico.

== See also ==
- General Norzagaray Bridge: crosses the Frailes Creek tributary
- List of rivers of Puerto Rico
