= Rio Preto =

Rio Preto may refer to:

== Inhabited places in Brazil ==
- Dores do Rio Preto, Espírito Santo
- Rio Preto, Minas Gerais
- Rio Preto da Eva, Amazonas
- Rio Preto National Forest, Espírito Santo
- Rio Preto State Park, Minas Gerais
- São José do Rio Preto, São Paulo
- São José do Vale do Rio Preto, Rio de Janeiro

== Sports ==
- Rio Preto Esporte Clube, a Brazilian football (soccer) club

== See also ==
- Preto River (disambiguation)
- Rio Pretão, a football (soccer) stadium
- Río Prieto (disambiguation)
