= Naranjito River =

River of Puerto Rico

Coordinates: 18.2818977°N 66.5987841°W

- Native name: Río Naranjito (Spanish)

Location
- Commonwealth: Puerto Rico
- Municipality: Jayuya

Physical characteristics
- Source
  - elevation: 1138 ft.

The Naranjito River (Spanish: Río Naranjito) is a river of Jayuya and Utuado in Puerto Rico.

== See also ==
- List of rivers of Puerto Rico
