= Coabey River =

River of Puerto Rico

Coordinates: 18.2482878°N 66.7946198°W

- Native name: Río Coabey (Spanish)

Location
- Commonwealth: Puerto Rico
- Municipality: Utuado

Physical characteristics
- Source
  - elevation: 1552 ft.

The Coabey River (Spanish: Río Coabey) is a river of Utuado and Adjuntas, Puerto Rico.

== See also ==
- List of rivers of Puerto Rico
