= Corcho River =

River of Puerto Rico

Coordinates: 18.1360709°N 66.6760069°W

- Native name: Río Corcho (Spanish)

Location
- Commonwealth: Puerto Rico
- Municipality: Adjuntas

Physical characteristics
- Source
  - elevation: 1765 feet

The Corcho River (Spanish: Río Corcho) is a river of Adjuntas, Puerto Rico.

== See also ==
- List of rivers of Puerto Rico
