= Saltillo River =

River of Puerto Rico

Coordinates: 18.1555144°N 66.7143408°W

- Native name: Río Saltillo (Spanish)

Location
- Commonwealth: Puerto Rico
- Municipality: Adjuntas

The Saltillo River (Spanish: Río Saltillo) is a river of Adjuntas, Puerto Rico. Saltillo is a tributary to the Río Grande de Arecibo river.

== See also ==
- List of rivers of Puerto Rico
