= Canovanillas River =

River of Puerto Rico

Coordinates: 18.3824487°N 65.9148868°W

- Native name: Río Canovanillas (Spanish)

Location
- Commonwealth: Puerto Rico
- Municipality: Carolina

Physical characteristics
- Source
  - location: Cerro La Condesa in Lomas, Canóvanas
- Mouth
  - location: Loíza River in Canóvanas Pueblo
  - elevation: 13 ft.

The Canovanillas River (Spanish: Río Canovanillas) is a tributary of the Loíza River that flows through the municipalities of Carolina and Canóvanas in Puerto Rico. Its headwaters are located in barrio Lomas of Canóvanas, close to Cerro La Condesa of the Sierra de Luquillo. Throughout its course, the river traces along the municipal boundaries of these two municipalities.

== See also ==
- List of rivers of Puerto Rico
