= Río Naranjo (Puerto Rico) =

River of Puerto Rico

Coordinates: 18.1024607°N 66.8635097°W

Location
- Commonwealth: Puerto Rico
- Municipality: Yauco

Physical characteristics
- Source
  - elevation: 577 ft.

The Río Naranjo is a river of Yauco, Puerto Rico.

== See also ==
- List of rivers of Puerto Rico
