= Río del Ingenio =

River of Puerto Rico

Coordinates: 18.0630204°N 65.8284949°W

Location
- Commonwealth: Puerto Rico
- Municipality: Yabucoa

Physical characteristics
- Source
  - elevation: 0 ft.

The Río del Ingenio is a river in Yabucoa, Puerto Rico.

== See also ==
- List of rivers of Puerto Rico
