= Salientito River =

River of Puerto Rico

Coordinates: 18.2046791°N 66.5548948°W

Location
- Commonwealth: Puerto Rico

The Salientito River is a river of Puerto Rico.

== See also ==
- List of rivers of Puerto Rico
