= Majada River =

River of Puerto Rico

Coordinates: 18.0196864°N 66.2590567°W

- Native name: Río Majada (Spanish)

Location
- Commonwealth: Puerto Rico
- Municipality: Salinas

Physical characteristics
- Source
  - elevation: 164 ft.
- Discharge
  - average: 16.7 sq. mi.

The Majada River (Spanish: Río Majada) is a river of Salinas and Cayey that flows near La Plena community in Quebrada Yeguas barrio, about 30 miles south of San Juan. The river has an average daily discharge of 2.9 cubic feet per second and a drainage area of 16.7 miles.

== See also ==
- List of rivers of Puerto Rico
