= Limones River =

River of Puerto Rico

Coordinates: 18.0621863°N 65.8804400°W

Río Limones

Location
- Commonwealth: Puerto Rico
- Municipality: Yabucoa

The Río Limones is a river located in Yabucoa, Puerto Rico.

== See also ==
- List of rivers of Puerto Rico
