= Casei River =

River of Puerto Rico

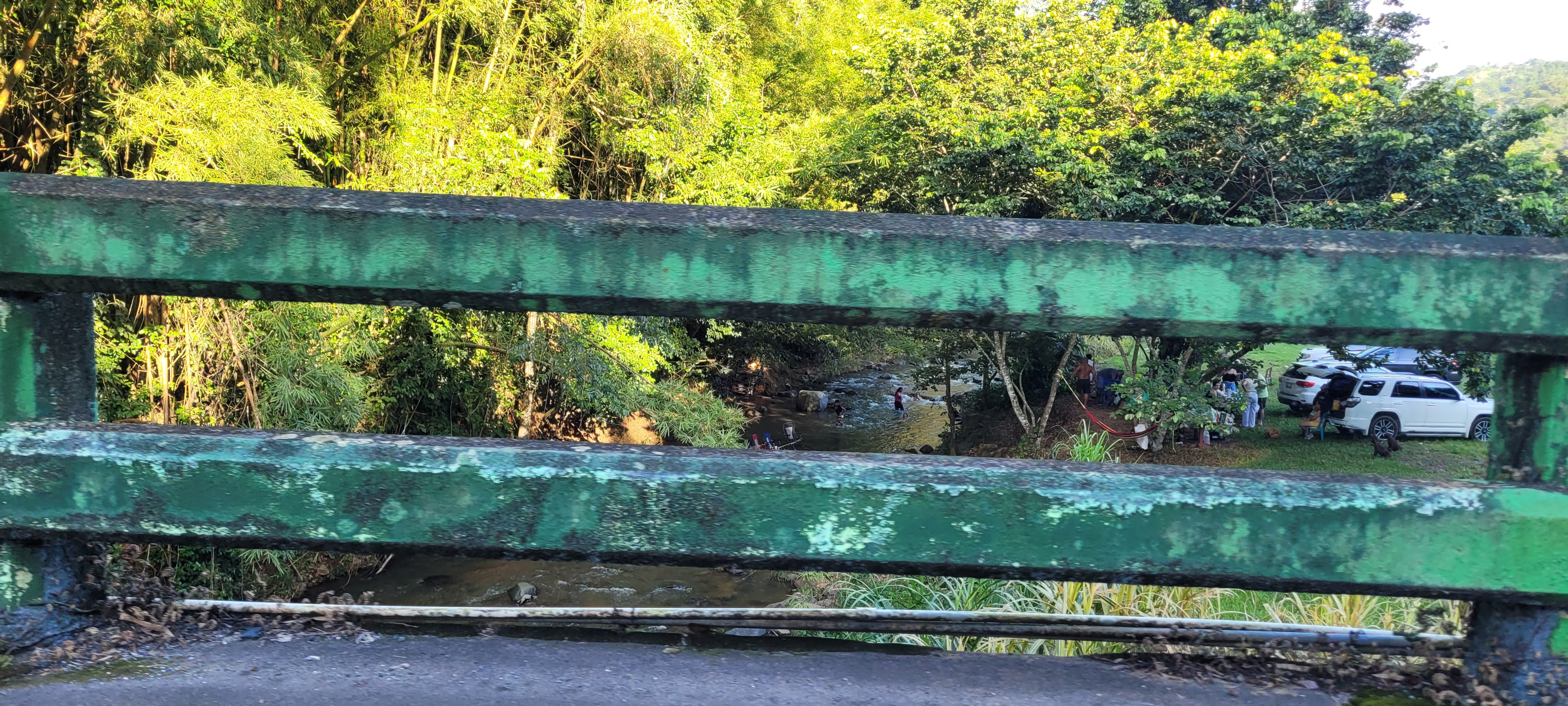
- Río Casei from Puerto Rico Highway 108
- Native name: Río Casei (Spanish)

Location
- Commonwealth: Puerto Rico
- Municipality: Las Marías

Physical characteristics
- Source
  - location: Río Cañas, Las Marías
  - coordinates: 18.2480089°N 67.0737904°W
- Mouth
  - location: Añasco River in Casey Abajo, Añasco

The Casei River (Spanish: Río Casei), sometimes also spelled Casey River (Río Casey), is a tributary of the Añasco River (Río Grande de Añasco) that flows through the municipalities of Las Marías, Mayagüez and Añasco in western Puerto Rico. It originates in the mountains of Las Marías, from where it flows northwest towards the Añasco Valley, creating a natural municipal boundary between Las Marías and Mayagüez along its path.

== See also ==
- List of rivers of Puerto Rico
