= Matrullas River =

River of Puerto Rico

Coordinates: 18.2566211°N 66.5010052°W

- Native name: Río Matrullas (Spanish)

Location
- Commonwealth: Puerto Rico
- Municipality: Ciales

Physical characteristics
- Source
  - elevation: 696 ft.

The Matrullas River (Spanish: Río Matrullas) is a river of Ciales and Orocovis, Puerto Rico.

== See also ==
- List of rivers of Puerto Rico
