= Demajagua River =

River of Puerto Rico

Coordinates: 18.2835665°N 65.6343281°W

- Native name: Río Demajagua (Spanish)

Location
- Commonwealth: Puerto Rico
- Municipality: Ceiba

The Demajagua River (Spanish: Río Demajagua) is a river of Ceiba, Puerto Rico.

== See also ==
- List of rivers of Puerto Rico
