= Sabana River (Naguabo, Puerto Rico) =

River of Puerto Rico

Location
- Commonwealth: Puerto Rico
- Municipality: Naguabo

Physical characteristics
- Source
  - coordinates: 18.2602332°N 65.7943296°W

The Sabana (Naguabo, Puerto Rico) is a river of Puerto Rico. It is a scenic river with pools, and rapids within extensive tropical forest.

== See also ==
- List of rivers of Puerto Rico
