= Jájome River =

River of Puerto Rico

Coordinates: 18.0460743°N 66.2015559°W

Location
- Commonwealth: Puerto Rico
- Municipality: Cayey and Salinas

The Jájome River is a river of Puerto Rico.

== See also ==
- List of rivers of Puerto Rico
