= Yahuecas River =

River in Puerto Rico

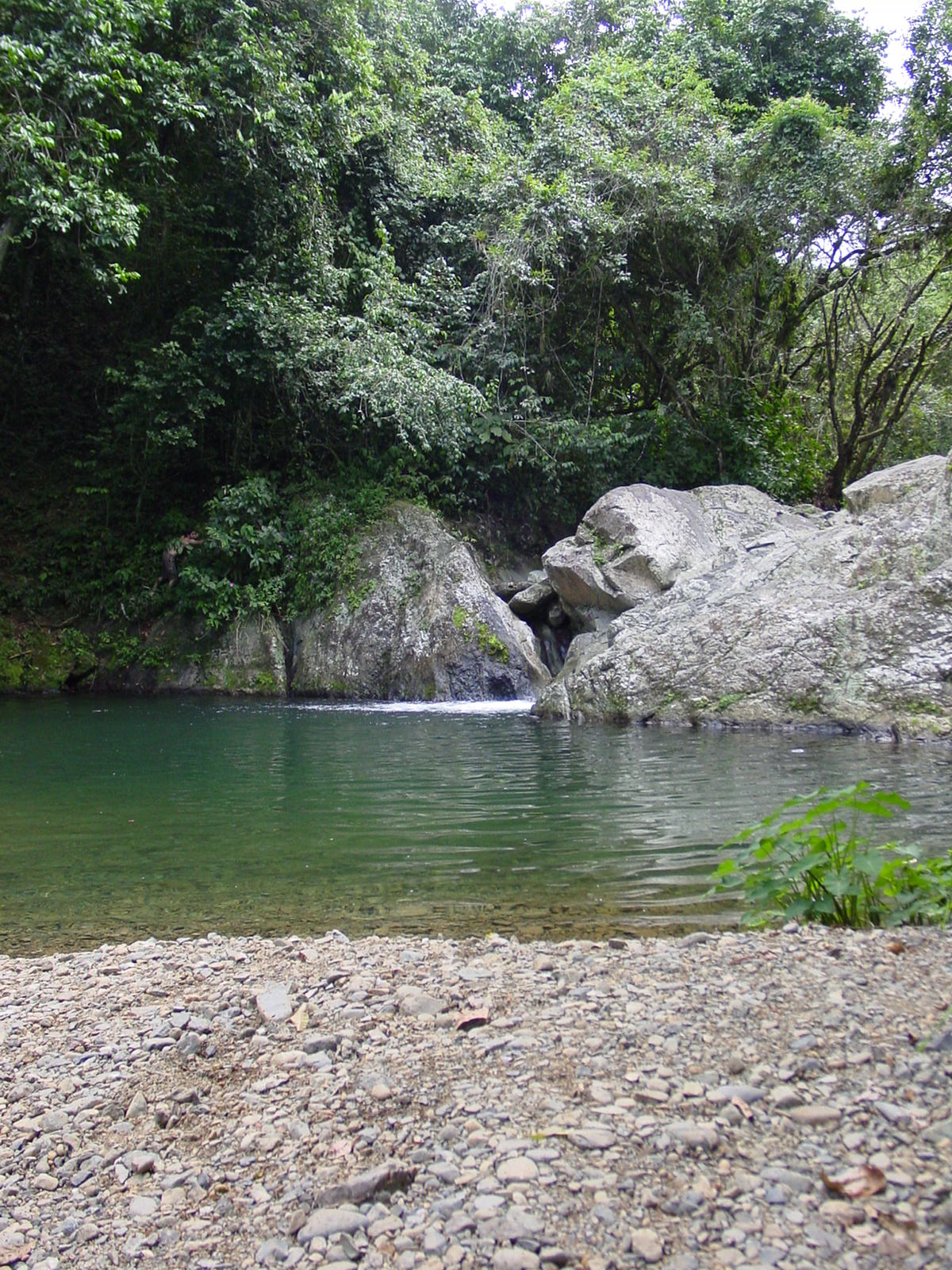
- Charco Mangó is on Yahuecas River
- Native name: Río Yahuecas (Spanish)

Location
- Commonwealth: Puerto Rico
- Municipality: Adjuntas

Physical characteristics
- Source
  - coordinates: 18.1749576°N 66.8012867°W

The Yahuecas River (Spanish: Río Yahuecas) is a river of Adjuntas, Puerto Rico. This river aids the hydroelectric dams named Yauco I and Yauco II.

== See also ==
- List of rivers of Puerto Rico
