= Hoconuco River =

River of Puerto Rico

Coordinates: 18.1071816°N 67.0804568°W

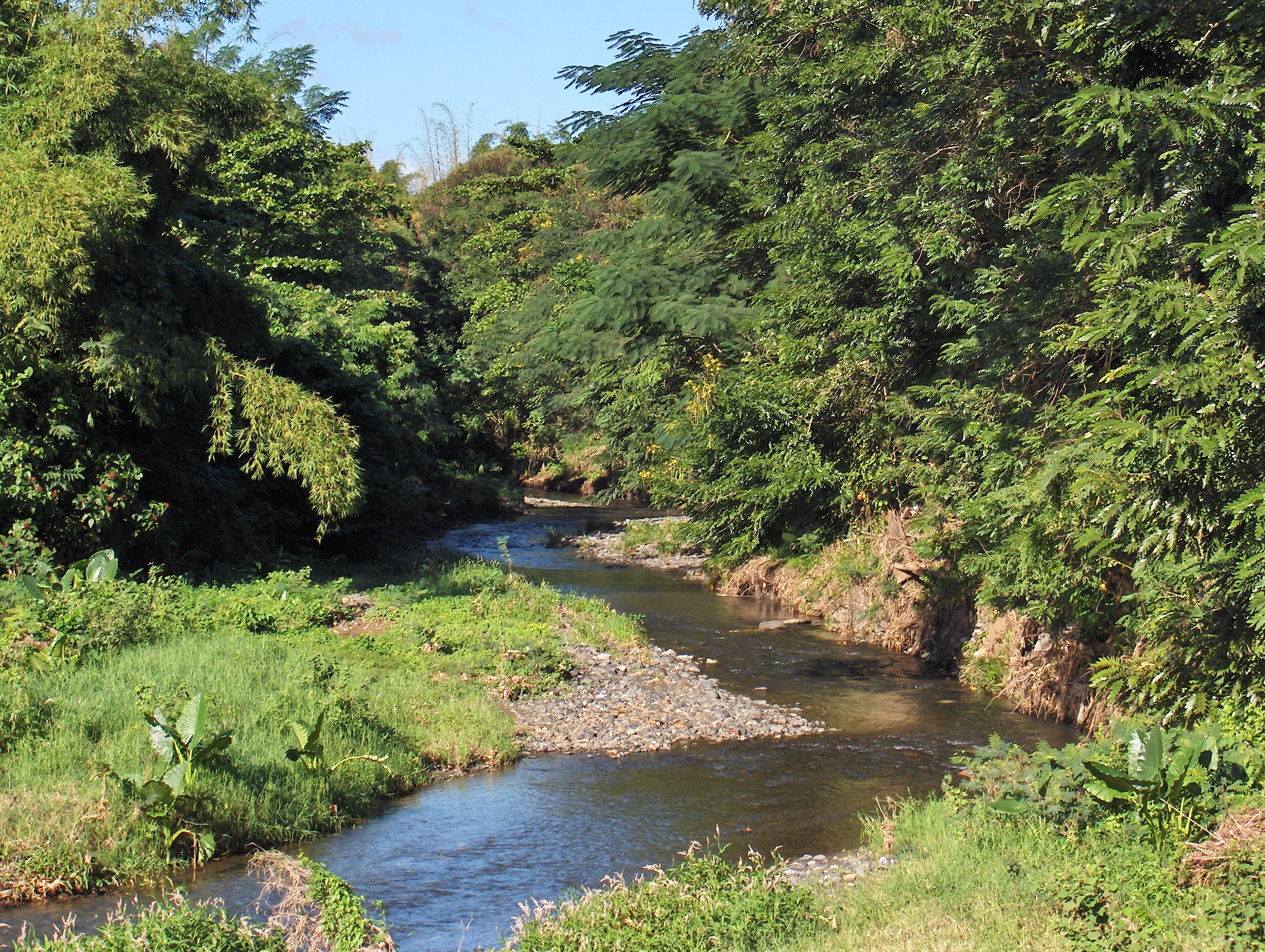
- Río Hoconuco
- Native name: Río Hoconuco (Spanish)

Location
- Commonwealth: Puerto Rico
- Municipality: San Germán

The Hoconuco River (Spanish: Río Hoconuco) is a river of San Germán, Puerto Rico. It goes through Hormigueros, a nearby municipality.

== See also ==
- List of rivers of Puerto Rico
