= Hondo River (Añasco, Puerto Rico) =

River of Puerto Rico

Coordinates: 18.2807845°N 67.1743472°W

Location
- Commonwealth: Puerto Rico
- Municipality: Añasco

The Hondo River (Añasco, Puerto Rico) is a river of Puerto Rico.

== See also ==
- List of rivers of Puerto Rico
