= Río Grande (Aguada, Puerto Rico) =

River of Puerto Rico

Coordinates: 18.3755017°N 67.2393473°W

Location
- Commonwealth: Puerto Rico
- Municipality: Aguada

The Río Grande (Aguada, Puerto Rico) is a river of Puerto Rico.

== See also ==
- List of rivers of Puerto Rico
