= Cubuy River (Canóvanas, Puerto Rico) =

River of Puerto Rico

Coordinates: 18.2893977°N 65.8796082°W

- Native name: Río Cubuy (Spanish)

Location
- Commonwealth: Puerto Rico
- Municipality: Loíza

The Cubuy River is a river of Puerto Rico.

== See also ==
- List of rivers of Puerto Rico
