= Lachi River =

River of Puerto Rico

Coordinates: 18.0391314°N 65.9618300°W

- Native name: Río Lachi (Spanish)

Location
- Commonwealth: Puerto Rico
- Municipality: Maunabo

Physical characteristics
- Source
  - elevation: 535 ft.

The Lachi River (Spanish: Río Lachi) is a river of Maunabo, Puerto Rico.

== See also ==
- List of rivers of Puerto Rico
