= Río del Pasto =

River of Puerto Rico

Coordinates: 18.0721843°N 66.3790587°W

Location
- Commonwealth: Puerto Rico
- Municipality: Coamo

Physical characteristics
- Source
  - elevation: 341 ft.

The Río del Pasto is a river of Coamo, Puerto Rico.

== See also ==
- List of rivers of Puerto Rico
