= Río de la Ciénaga =

River of Puerto Rico

Coordinates: 18.1555144°N 66.7143408°W

Location
- Commonwealth: Puerto Rico
- Municipality: Adjuntas

Physical characteristics
- Source
  - elevation: 1726 ft

The Río de la Ciénaga is a river of Adjuntas, Puerto Rico.

== See also ==
- List of rivers of Puerto Rico
