= Río de las Vacas =

River of Puerto Rico

Coordinates: 18.2543990°N 66.5554503°W

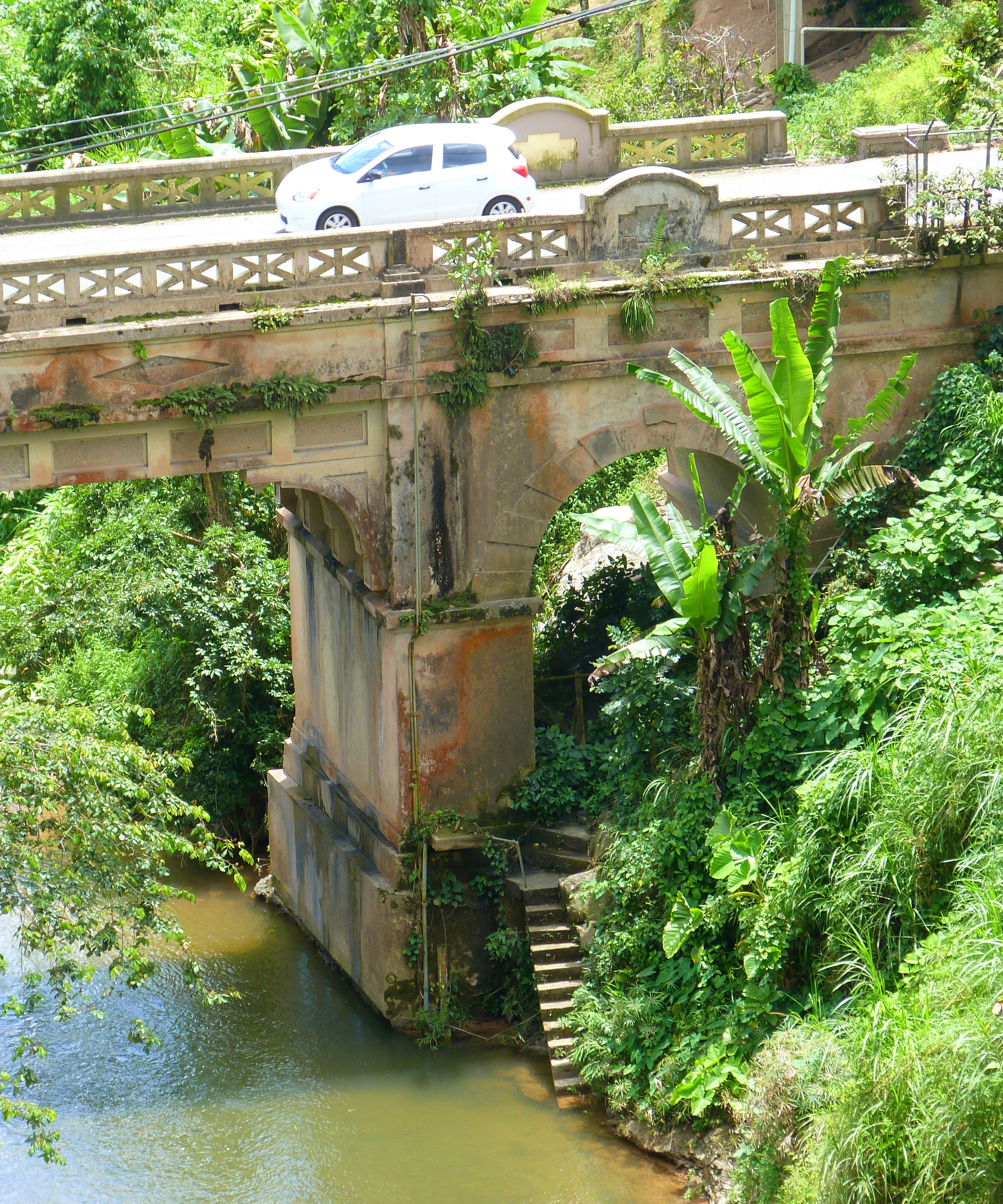

Location
- Commonwealth: Puerto Rico
- Municipality: Ciales

Physical characteristics
- Source
  - elevation: 1726 feet

The Río de las Vacas is a river of Ciales, Puerto Rico.

== See also ==
- List of rivers of Puerto Rico
