= Zamas River =

River of Puerto Rico

Coordinates: 18.2099565°N 66.6165619°W

- Native name: Río Zamas (Spanish)

Location
- Commonwealth: Puerto Rico
- Municipality: Jayuya

The Zamas River (Spanish: Río Zamas) is a river of Jayuya, Puerto Rico.

== See also ==
- List of rivers of Puerto Rico
