= Flores River =

River of Puerto Rico

Coordinates: 18.2194007°N 66.2707240°W

- Native name: Río Flores (Spanish)

Location
- Commonwealth: Puerto Rico
- Municipality: Sabana Grande

Physical characteristics
- Source
  - elevation: 1050 ft.

The Flores River (Spanish: Río Flores) is a river of Sabana Grande, Puerto Rico.

== See also ==
- List of rivers of Puerto Rico
