= Clavijo River =

River of Puerto Rico

Coordinates: 18.1707916°N 66.1248885°W

- Native name: Río Clavijo (Spanish)

Location
- Commonwealth: Puerto Rico
- Municipality: Cidra

Physical characteristics
- Source
  - elevation: 1358 ft.

The Clavijo River (Spanish: Río Clavijo) is a river of Cidra, Puerto Rico.

== See also ==
- List of rivers of Puerto Rico
