= Río de Caguanita =

River of Puerto Rico

Coordinates: 18.3021744°N 66.7101744°W

Location
- Commonwealth: Puerto Rico
- Municipality: Utuado

Physical characteristics
- Source
  - elevation: 427 ft.

The Río de Caguanita is a river of Utuado, Puerto Rico.

== See also ==
- List of rivers of Puerto Rico
