= Emajagua River =

River of Puerto Rico

Coordinates: 18.1207942°N 65.9876640°W

- Native name: Río Emajagua (Spanish)

Location
- Commonwealth: Puerto Rico
- Municipality: San Lorenzo

Physical characteristics
- Source
  - elevation: 636 ft

The Emajagua River (Spanish: Río Emajagua) is a river of San Lorenzo, Puerto Rico.

== See also ==
- List of rivers of Puerto Rico
