= Nueve Pasos River =

River of Puerto Rico

Coordinates: 18.1494020°N 67.0640684°W

Location
- Commonwealth: Puerto Rico

The Nueve Pasos River is a river of Puerto Rico.

== See also ==
- List of rivers of Puerto Rico
