= Hondo River (Hormigueros, Puerto Rico) =

River of Puerto Rico

Coordinates: 18.1530124°N 67.1593464°W

- Native name: Río Hondo (Spanish)

Location
- Commonwealth: Puerto Rico
- Municipality: Hormigueros

The Hondo River (Spanish: Río Hondo) is a river of Hormigueros, Puerto Rico. It runs through the municipalities of Hormigueros, Mayagüez, and Cabo Rojo.

The Hondo River is classified as a stream in the region and forms part of the local hydrographic network of western Puerto Rico, contributing to the island’s watercourses. It is situated at a low elevation close to sea level and is catalogued in geographic databases that record features of rivers and streams across the territory.

== See also ==
- List of rivers of Puerto Rico
