= Cuesta Arriba River =

River of Puerto Rico

Coordinates: 18.2960642°N 66.2087788°W

- Native name: Río Cuesta Arriba (Spanish)

Location
- Commonwealth: Puerto Rico
- Municipality: Bayamón

Physical characteristics
- Source
  - elevation: 161 ft.

The Cuesta Arriba River (Spanish: Río Cuesta Arriba) is a river of Bayamón and Aguas Buenas in Puerto Rico.

== See also ==
- List of rivers of Puerto Rico
