= Sonador River =

River of Puerto Rico

Coordinates: 18.3443938°N 67.0224010°W

Location
- Commonwealth: Puerto Rico

The Sonador River is a river of Puerto Rico.

== See also ==
- List of rivers of Puerto Rico
