= Río de Barranquitas =

River of Puerto Rico

Coordinates: 18.1691250°N 66.2915576°W

Location
- Commonwealth: Puerto Rico
- Municipality: Barranquitas

Physical characteristics
- Source
  - elevation: 1138 ft.

The Río de Barranquitas is a river of Barranquitas, Puerto Rico.

== See also ==
- List of rivers of Puerto Rico
