= Dagüey River =

River of Puerto Rico

Coordinates: 18.2713407°N 67.1457355°W

- Native name: Río Dagüey (Spanish)

Location
- Commonwealth: Puerto Rico
- Municipality: Añasco

Physical characteristics
- Length: 10 ft.

The Dagüey River (Spanish: Río Dagüey) is a river of Añasco, Puerto Rico.

== See also ==
- List of rivers of Puerto Rico
