= Lapa River =

River of Puerto Rico

Coordinates: 18.0355191°N 66.2404454°W

- Native name: Río Lapa (Spanish)

Location
- Commonwealth: Puerto Rico
- Municipality: Cayey

Physical characteristics
- Source
  - elevation: 246 ft.

The Lapa River (Spanish: Río Lapa) is a river of Cayey and Salinas, Puerto Rico.

== See also ==
- List of rivers of Puerto Rico
