= Chiquito River (Guayama, Puerto Rico) =

River of Puerto Rico

Coordinates: 18.0799621°N 66.1090546°W

Location
- Commonwealth: Puerto Rico
- Municipality: Guayama

The Chiquito River (Guayama, Puerto Rico) is a river of Puerto Rico.

== See also ==
- List of rivers of Puerto Rico
