= Río Toro =

River of Puerto Rico

Coordinates: 18.1866240°N 66.7707306°W

Toro River
- Native name: Río Toro (Spanish)

Location
- Commonwealth: Puerto Rico
- Municipality: Adjuntas

Physical characteristics
- Source
  - elevation: 1768 feet

Río Toro is a river of Adjuntas, Puerto Rico.

== See also ==
- List of rivers of Puerto Rico
