= Río de Caguana =

River in Puerto Rico

Coordinates: 18.3005078°N 66.7054521°W

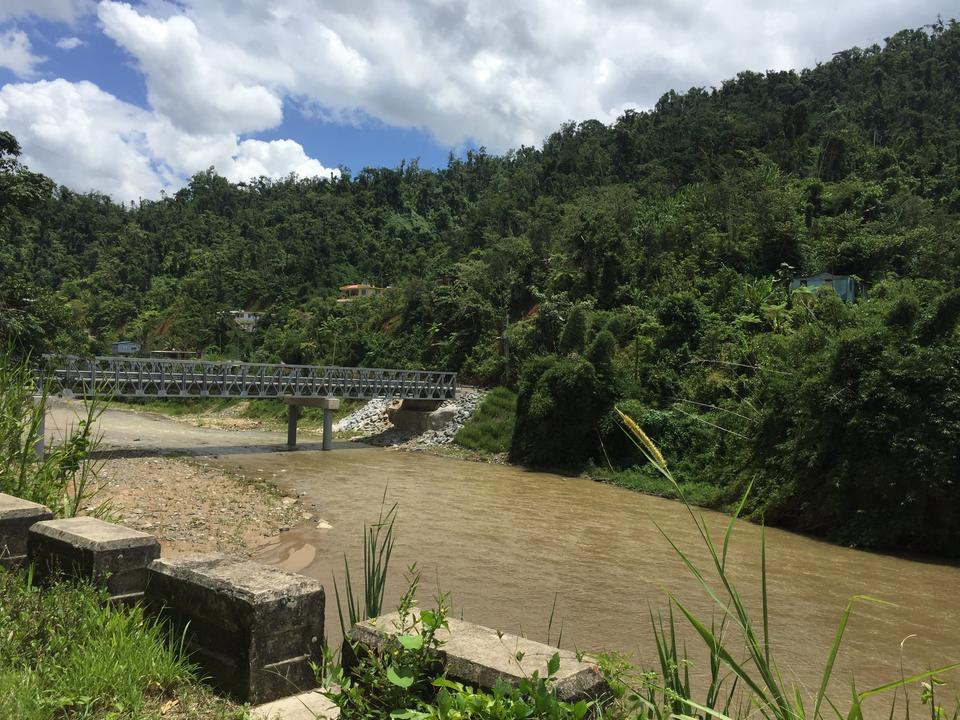

Location
- Commonwealth: Puerto Rico
- Municipality: Utuado

Physical characteristics
- Source
  - elevation: 367 ft.

The Río de Caguana is a river of Utuado, Puerto Rico.

== See also ==
- List of rivers of Puerto Rico
