= Garzas River =

River of Puerto Rico

Coordinates: 18.1571810°N 66.7429523°W

- Native name: Río Garzas (Spanish)

Location
- Commonwealth: Puerto Rico
- Municipality: Adjuntas

Physical characteristics
- Source
  - elevation: 1604 ft

The Garzas River (Spanish: Río Garzas) is a river of Adjuntas, Puerto Rico. Garzas is a tributary to the Río Grande de Arecibo river.

== See also ==
- List of rivers of Puerto Rico
