= Humata River =

River of Puerto Rico

Coordinates: 18.2827294°N 67.1060130°W

- Native name: Río Humata (Spanish)

Location
- Commonwealth: Puerto Rico
- Municipality: Añasco

The Humata River (Spanish: Río Humata) is a river of Añasco, Puerto Rico.

== See also ==
- List of rivers of Puerto Rico
