= Macaná River =

River of Puerto Rico

Coordinates: 18.0063542°N 66.7685084°W

- Native name: Río Macaná (Spanish)

Location
- Commonwealth: Puerto Rico
- Municipality: Guayanilla

The Macaná River (Spanish: Río Macaná) is a river of Guayanilla and Peñuelas, Puerto Rico.

== See also ==
- List of rivers of Puerto Rico
