= Hondo River (Bayamón, Puerto Rico) =

River of Puerto Rico

Coordinates: 18.4024481°N 66.1576669°W

Río Hondo

Location
- Commonwealth: Puerto Rico
- Municipality: Bayamón

The Río Hondo (Bayamón, Puerto Rico) is a river of Puerto Rico.

The river lends its name to a neighborhood, the Rio Hondo neighborhood, or "Urbanizacion Rio Hondo", also in Bayamón, and to the neighborhood's mall, Plaza Rio Hondo (Plaza Rio Hondo).

== See also ==
- List of rivers of Puerto Rico
