= Roncador River =

River of Puerto Rico

Coordinates: 18.2538433°N 66.7351746°W

Location
- Commonwealth: Puerto Rico

The Roncador River is a river of Puerto Rico.

== See also ==
- List of rivers of Puerto Rico
