= Río de Apeadero =

River of Puerto Rico

Coordinates: 17.9913550°N 66.0076637°W

Location
- Commonwealth: Puerto Rico
- Municipality: Patillas

The Río de Apeadero is a river of Patillas, Puerto Rico.

== See also ==
- List of rivers of Puerto Rico
