= Cidra River =

River of Puerto Rico

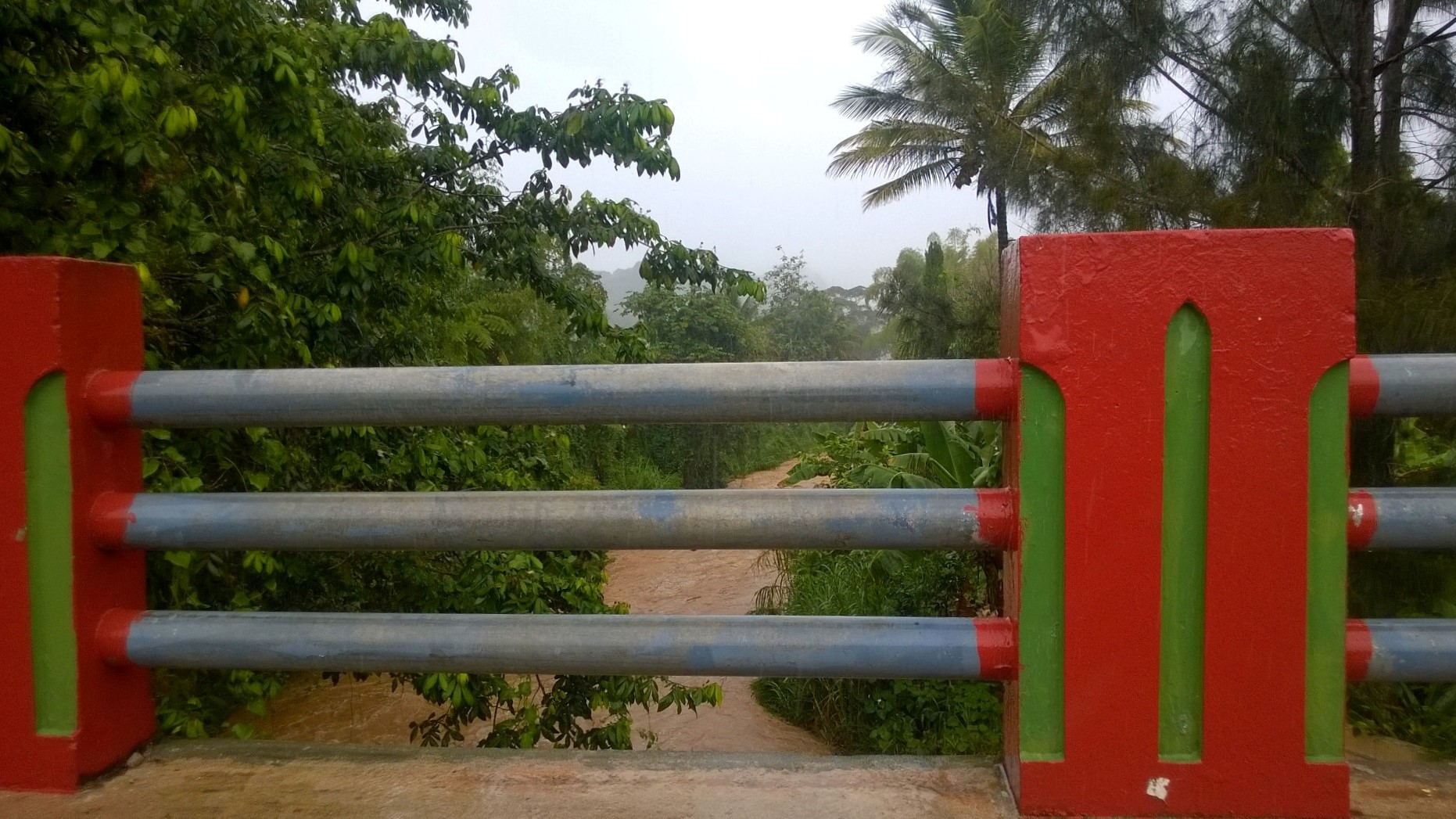
- Native name: Río Cidra (Spanish)

Location
- Commonwealth: Puerto Rico
- Municipality: Adjuntas

Physical characteristics
- Source
  - coordinates: 18.1794023°N 66.7365634°W
  - elevation: 1440 feet

The Cidra River (Spanish: Río Cidra) is a river of Adjuntas, Puerto Rico. Cidra is a tributary to the Río Grande de Arecibo river.

== See also ==
- List of rivers of Puerto Rico
