= Sapo River =

River of Puerto Rico

Coordinates: 18.1746796°N 66.8782322°W

The Sapo River is a river in the U.S. commonwealth of Puerto Rico.
