= Río del Cristal =

River of Puerto Rico

Coordinates: 18.3141202°N 65.7293289°W

Location
- Commonwealth: Puerto Rico
- Municipality: Luquillo

Physical characteristics
- Source
  - elevation: 479 ft.

The Río del Cristal is a river of Luquillo, Puerto Rico.

== See also ==
- List of rivers of Puerto Rico
