= Río Grande de Jayuya =

River of Puerto Rico

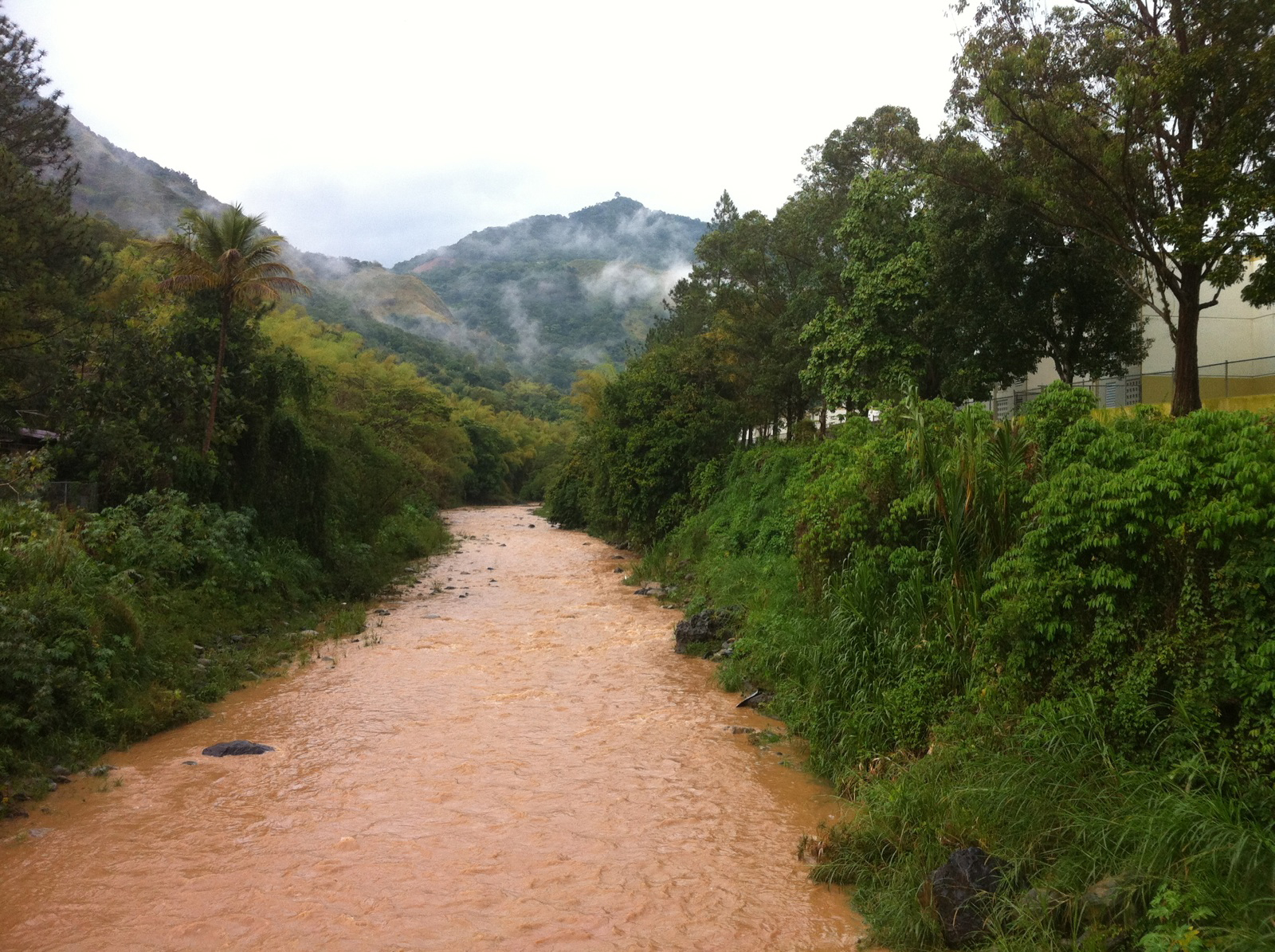

Location
- Commonwealth: Puerto Rico
- Municipality: Jayuya

Physical characteristics
- Source
  - coordinates: 18.2188450°N 66.6404511°W
  - elevation: 1033 feet

The Río Grande de Jayuya is a river of Jayuya and Utuado, Puerto Rico. It is a tributary to the Río Grande de Arecibo river.

== History ==
This was the favorite river and playtime spot of Griselio Torresola as a child. In his later life, Griselio became a Puerto Rican nationalist and was one of the would-be assassins of U.S. President Harry S. Truman in 1950.

== Gallery ==
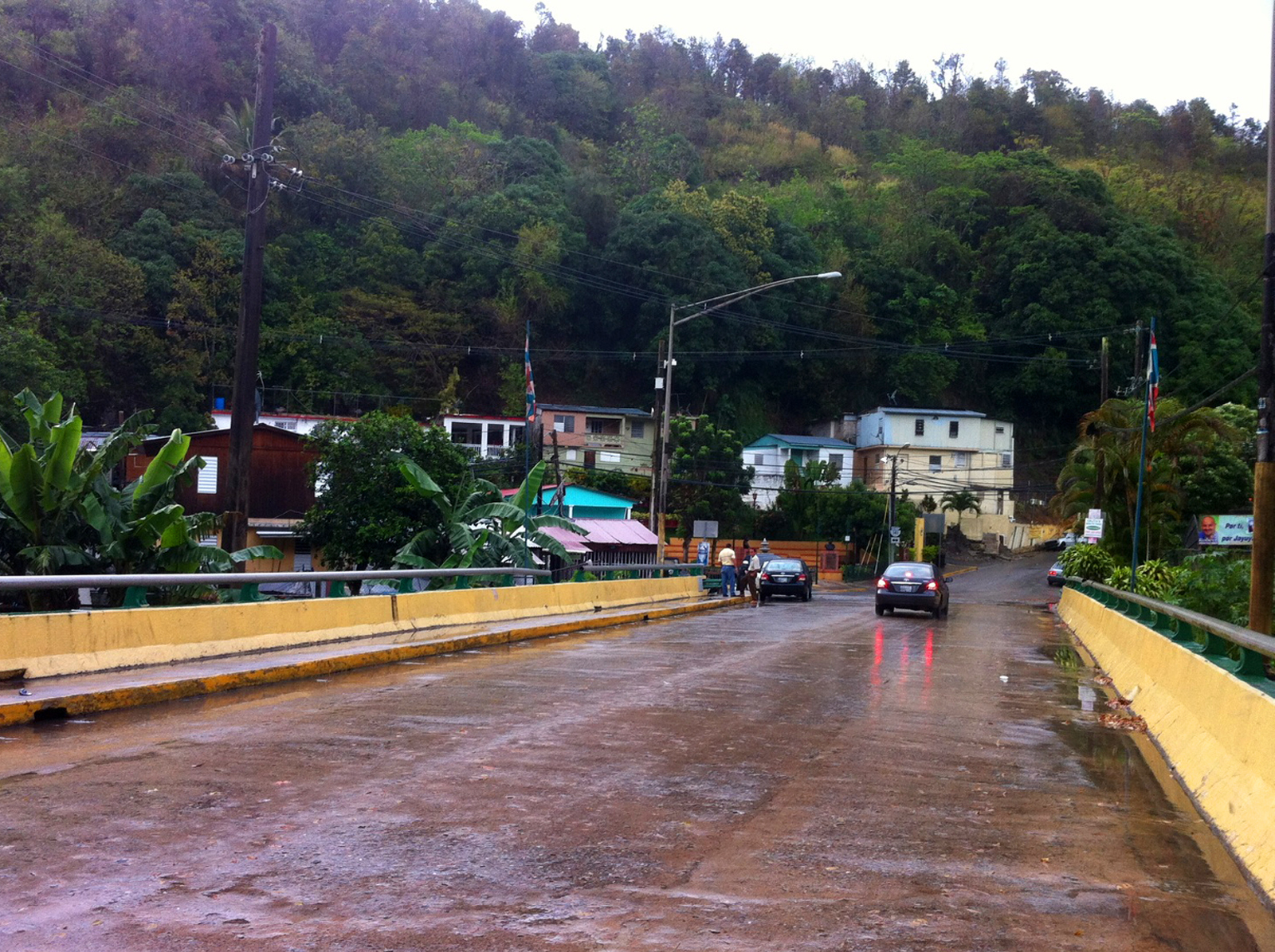
Bridge over Río Grande in Jayuya (PR-141R), entrance to barrio-pueblo on the left

== See also ==
- List of rivers of Puerto Rico
