= Minillas River =

River of Puerto Rico

Coordinates: 18.3574503°N 66.1418335°W

- Native name: Río Minillas (Spanish)

Location
- Commonwealth: Puerto Rico
- Municipality: Bayamón

The Minillas River (Spanish: Río Minillas) is a river of Bayamón, Puerto Rico.

== See also ==
- List of rivers of Puerto Rico
