= Río de las Vegas =

River of Puerto Rico

Coordinates: 18.1069061°N 65.9434965°W

Location
- Commonwealth: Puerto Rico
- Municipality: San Lorenzo

The Río de las Vegas is a river of San Lorenzo, Puerto Rico.

== See also ==
- List of rivers of Puerto Rico
