= Marín River =

River of Puerto Rico

Coordinates: 18.0302424°N 66.0115528°W

- Native name: Río Marín (Spanish)

Location
- Commonwealth: Puerto Rico
- Municipality: Patillas

Physical characteristics
- Mouth
  - elevation: 223 feet

The Marín River (Spanish: Río Marín) is a river of Patillas, Puerto Rico.

== See also ==
- List of rivers of Puerto Rico
