= Frío River (Puerto Rico) =

River of Puerto Rico

- Native name: Río Frío (Spanish)

Location
- Commonwealth: Puerto Rico
- Municipality: Barranquitas

Physical characteristics
- Source
  - coordinates: 18.2194007°N 66.2707240°W
  - elevation: 1050 ft

The Frío River (Spanish: Río Frío) is a river in Barranquitas and Comerío, Puerto Rico.

== See also ==
- List of rivers of Puerto Rico
