= Coco River (Puerto Rico) =

River of Puerto Rico

Coordinates: 18.0699618°N 66.9448991°W

- Native name: Río Coco (Spanish)

Location
- Commonwealth: Puerto Rico
- Municipality: Sabana Grande

Physical characteristics
- Source
  - elevation: 318 ft.

The Coco River (Spanish: Río Coco) is a river in Sabana Grande in Puerto Rico.
