= Juan Martín River =

River of Puerto Rico

Coordinates: 18.3663403°N 65.6765506°W

Río Juan Martín

Location
- Commonwealth: Puerto Rico

The Río Juan Martín is a river of Puerto Rico.

== See also ==
- List of rivers of Puerto Rico
