= Maunabo River =

River of Puerto Rico

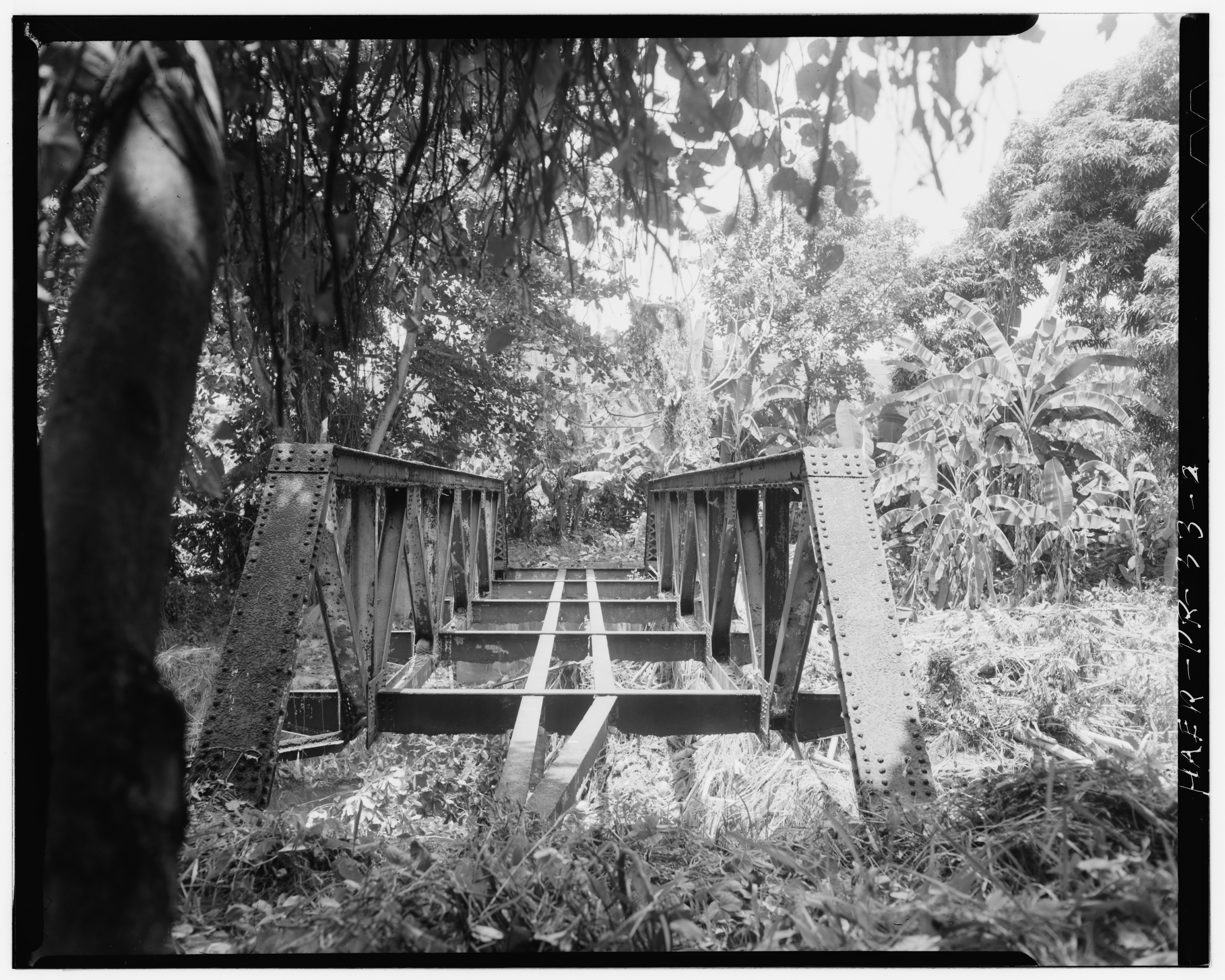
- Bridge over Maunabo River, 1993
- Native name: Río Maunabo (Spanish)

Location
- Commonwealth: Puerto Rico
- Municipality: Maunabo

Physical characteristics
- Source
  - coordinates: 17.9902448°N 65.8959956°W

The Maunabo River (Spanish: Río Maunabo) is a river of Maunabo, Puerto Rico. It was known by the Taino as Manatuabón.

== See also ==
- List of rivers of Puerto Rico
