= Nigua River (Arroyo, Puerto Rico) =

River of Puerto Rico

Coordinates: 17.9596896°N 66.0579421°W

- Native name: Río Nigua (Spanish)

Location
- Commonwealth: Puerto Rico
- Municipality: Arroyo

The Nigua River (Spanish: Río Nigua) is a river of Arroyo, Puerto Rico.

== See also ==
- List of rivers of Puerto Rico
