= Dos Bocas River =

River of Puerto Rico

- Native name: Río Dos Bocas (Spanish)

Location
- Commonwealth: Puerto Rico
- Municipality: Corozal

Physical characteristics
- Source
  - coordinates: 18.3274516°N 66.3268359°W

The Dos Bocas River (Spanish: Río Dos Bocas) is a river of Corozal, Puerto Rico. Dos Bocas means two mouths in Spanish.

== See also ==
- List of rivers of Puerto Rico
