= Piedra Blanca (Puerto Rico) =

Mountain in Puerto Rico

- Location within Puerto Rico

Highest point
- Elevation: 4,042 ft (1,232 m)
- Coordinates: 18°10′45″N 66°34′35″W

Naming
- Etymology: Spanish for "white rock"

Geography
- Location: Jayuya, Puerto Rico
- Parent range: Cordillera Central

Piedra Blanca is the fourth highest peak of Puerto Rico measuring 4,042 feet (1,232 m) above sea level. Piedra Blanca, which is Spanish for "white rock", is located in the Cordillera Central or Central Mountain Range of Puerto Rico, in the Veguitas barrio of Jayuya, close to Cerro de Punta and Cerro Rosa.
