= Loco River =

River of Puerto Rico

Coordinates: 17.9710775°N 66.9215649°W

- Native name: Río Loco (Spanish)

Location
- Commonwealth: Puerto Rico
- Municipality: Guánica

The Loco River (Spanish: Río Loco) is a river of Guánica, Puerto Rico.

== See also ==
- List of rivers of Puerto Rico
