= Veguitas River =

River of Puerto Rico

Coordinates: 18.2021792°N 66.5796172°W

- Native name: Río Veguitas (Spanish)

Location
- Commonwealth: Puerto Rico
- Municipality: Jayuya

Physical characteristics
- Source
  - elevation: 1722 feet

The Veguitas River (Spanish: Río Veguitas) is a river of Jayuya, Puerto Rico.

== See also ==
- List of rivers of Puerto Rico
