= Palmarejo River =

River of Puerto Rico

Coordinates: 18.2910639°N 66.6146176°W

- Native name: Río Palmarejo (Spanish)

Location
- Commonwealth: Puerto Rico
- Municipality: Utuado

Physical characteristics
- Source
  - elevation: 735 ft.

The Palmarejo River (Spanish: Río Palmarejo) is a river of Utuado in Puerto Rico.

== See also ==
- List of rivers of Puerto Rico
