= Guayanés River (Yabucoa, Puerto Rico) =

River of Puerto Rico

Coordinates: 18.0582985°N 65.8257169°W

Location
- Commonwealth: Puerto Rico

The Guayanés is a river of Puerto Rico.

== See also ==
- List of rivers of Puerto Rico
