= Prieto River (Naguabo, Puerto Rico) =

River of Puerto Rico

Coordinates: 18.2532892°N 65.7846073°W

- Native name: Río Prieto (Spanish)

Location
- Commonwealth: Puerto Rico
- Municipality: Naguabo

Physical characteristics
- Source
  - elevation: 689 ft.

The Prieto River (Spanish: Río Prieto) is a river of Naguabo, Puerto Rico.

== See also ==
- List of rivers of Puerto Rico
