= Río Seco, Puerto Rico =

River of Puerto Rico

Coordinates: 17.9530227°N 66.1879445°W

Río Seco (Spanish for "dry river") is a river located on the southern coastal valley region of Puerto Rico. It originates at the Barrio Pozo Hondo of the municipality of Guayama at an elevation of 984 feet (300 meters) above sea level. The river has a length of approximately 8 miles emptying into the Bay of Jobos.
