= Prieto River (Yabucoa, Puerto Rico) =

River of Puerto Rico

Coordinates: 18.0780183°N 65.9893305°W

Location
- Commonwealth: Puerto Rico
- Municipality: Yabucoa

The Prieto River (Yabucoa, Puerto Rico) is a river of Puerto Rico.

== See also ==
- List of rivers of Puerto Rico
