= Lajas River =

River of Puerto Rico

Coordinates: 18.1699573°N 66.9640665°W

- Native name: Río Lajas (Spanish)

Location
- Commonwealth: Puerto Rico
- Municipality: Maricao

Physical characteristics
- Source
  - elevation: 1243 ft.

The Lajas River (Spanish: Río Lajas) is a river in Maricao, Puerto Rico.

== See also ==
- List of rivers of Puerto Rico
