= Prieto River (Maricao, Puerto Rico) =

River of Puerto Rico

Coordinates: 18.1846785°N 67.0312900°W

Location
- Commonwealth: Puerto Rico
- Municipality: Maricao

The Prieto River (Maricao, Puerto Rico) is a river of Puerto Rico.

== See also ==
- List of rivers of Puerto Rico
