= Prieto River (Lares, Puerto Rico) =

River of Puerto Rico

Location
- Commonwealth: Puerto Rico
- Municipality: Lares

Physical characteristics
- Source
  - coordinates: 18.2532874°N 66.9073992°W

The Prieto River is a river in Lares, Puerto Rico.

== History ==
During the Spanish-American War (1898), a number of Spanish soldiers drowned in this river:

I overtook him Saturday morning about three and one-half miles north of Las Marias. His infantry had pulled his guns over roads that were almost perpendicular. His troops were exchanging shots at long range across a deep valley with the retreating Spaniards, most of whom had forded (losing a lot of men, who were drowned) a deep and rapid river known in that country as the Rio Prieto. Our fire had already demoralized the thoroughly disheartened and half-famished Spanish soldiers; and their rear-guard, at least, was also disorganized and hiding in the hills.

== See also ==
- List of rivers of Puerto Rico
