= Guabá River =

River of Puerto Rico

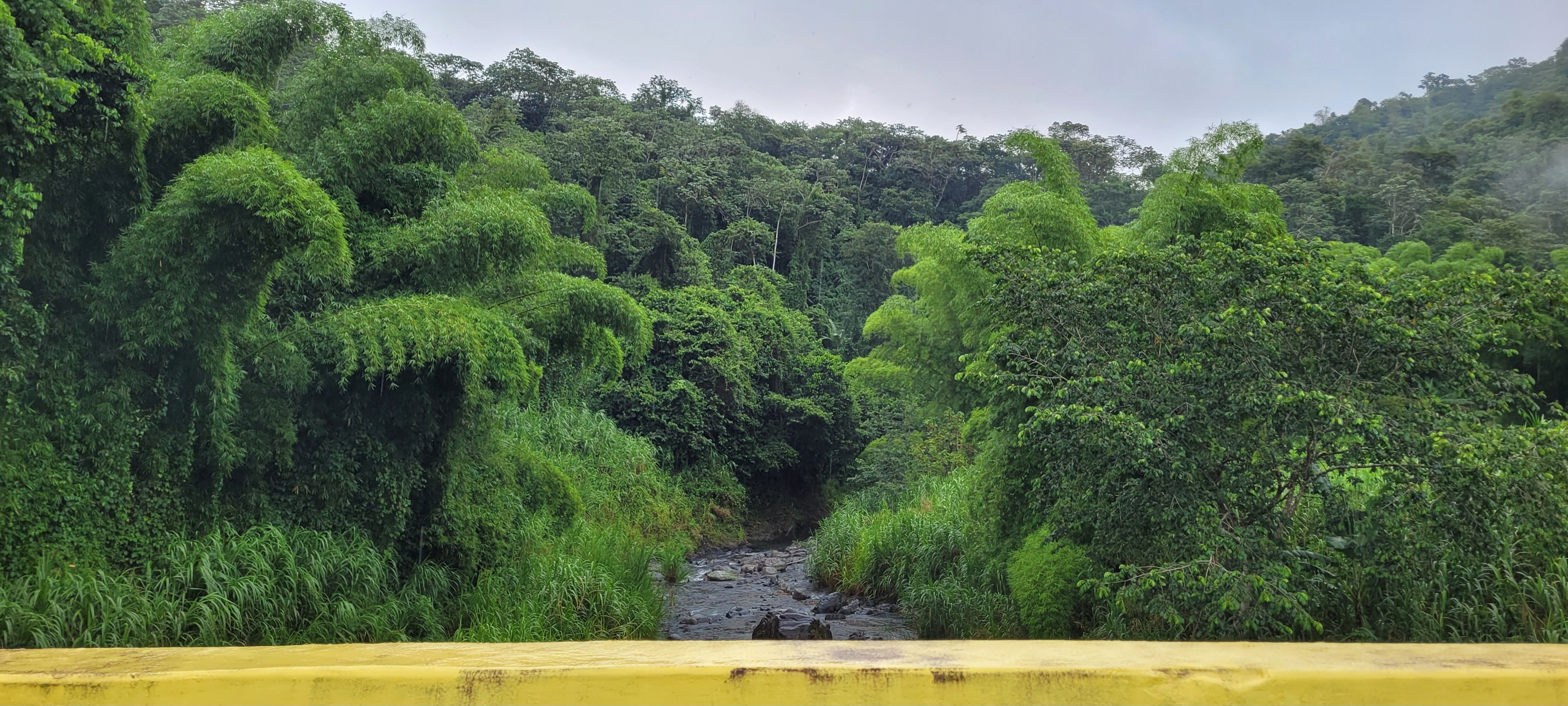
- Guabá River from Puerto Rico Highway 409
- Native name: Río Guabá (Spanish)

Location
- Commonwealth: Puerto Rico
- Municipality: Las Marías

Physical characteristics
- Source
  - coordinates: 18.2532874°N 66.9310106°W
  - elevation: 410 ft

The Guabá River (Spanish: Río Guabá) is a river of Las Marías, Puerto Rico. It goes through Maricao as well.

== See also ==
- List of rivers of Puerto Rico
