= Puerto Rico Highway 10 =

Highway in Puerto Rico

Highway 10
- Ruta 10
- PR-10 highlighted in red

Route information
- Maintained by Puerto Rico DTPW
- Length: 70.1 km (43.6 mi)
- Existed: 1902–present

Major junctions
- South end: PR-5506 in Vayas–Sabanetas
- PR-52 in Sabanetas; PR-14 / PR-139 in Machuelo Abajo–Machuelo Arriba; PR-503 / PR-504 in Portugués; PR-9 in Portugués; PR-143 in Saltillo; PR-5516 in Juan González; PR-123 in Juan González; PR-111 in Salto Abajo; PR-123 / PR-6609 in Hato Viejo; PR-22 in Tanamá
- North end: PR-2 in Arecibo barrio-pueblo

Location
- Country: United States
- Territory: Puerto Rico
- Municipalities: Ponce, Adjuntas, Utuado, Arecibo

Highway system
- Roads in Puerto Rico; List
| ← PR-9 | → PR-12 |

Puerto Rico Highway 10 (PR-10) is a major highway in Puerto Rico. The primary state road connects the city of Ponce in the south coast to Arecibo in the north; it is also the shortest route between the two cities.

Construction on the modern PR-10, a new 68.26-kilometer (42.41 mi) highway, began in 1974. The highway is being built parallel to the old PR-10; that road is now signed PR-123. Most of the new PR-10 is now complete, with an approximately 10-kilometer (6.2 mi) stretch still remaining to be finished. In its current state it is a freeway only in the completed portions, which consists of over three-fourths of the highway.

In May 2010, Autoridad de Carreteras estimated the road would be completed in 2015, at a cost of $500 million. Upon completion, the highway is expected to become one of the two major roads on the island that cross the Cordillera Central mountain range. The first section of the road was inaugurated in the year 2000. After "more than 40 years" since the project was initiated, as of 22 January 2017, 10 kilometers (6.2 mi) remained to be completed.

== Route description ==
PR-10 runs generally north-south over the scenic mountains of the Cordillera Central with magnificent views of the surrounding mountain tops. After its initial completion, the road was described as "(being) of first class construction throughout, and present(ing) a panorama of magnificent scenery, rivaling the views of any of the famed roads of Europe." When completed, the reconstructed highway will significantly reduce travel time. Due to the rugged terrain, several sections of the new highway required the construction of bridges.

=== Ponce to Adjuntas ===
Map of the PR-10 as it goes through the municipality of Ponce

PR-10 has its southern terminus at PR-5506, near PR-1, at the entrance to Mercedita International Airport. The first four miles runs northwesterly, bypassing the City of Ponce to the north.. The road crosses barrio Sabanetas, intersecting PR-52, leading to Mayagüez and San Juan. The road also crosses barrio Machuelo Abajo, and an interchange with PR-14, which goes to downtown Ponce and Coamo. In barrio Machuelo Arriba, there is an interchange with PR-505 which leads to downtown Ponce and barrio San Patricio. Further west it meets PR-503 in barrio Portugués, which leads south to downtown Ponce, north to barrio San Patricio, and to barrio Consejo in southern Jayuya. This interchange also connects to PR-504, which leads to downtown Ponce and to the northern areas of barrio Portugués. The road then enters barrio Portugués Urbano where it intersects the northern terminus of PR-9, which leads to PR-2 in Ponce's barrio Canas.

At this point PR-10 turns sharply north and heads into the mountains of barrio Tibes. Halfway through Tibes it intersects PR-503. It runs briefly through barrio San Patricio before entering barrio Guaraguao. As it enters barrio Guaraguao, the road intersects with PR-515, which leads to PR-123, the old road between Ponce and Arecibo. Continuing on its northerly course, PR-10 then enters the municipality of Adjuntas via Adjuntas' barrio Portugués, where the headwaters of Ponce's Río Portugués is located. As the road goes from Adjuntas' barrio Portugués to barrio Saltillo, it intersects with Puerto Rico's Panoramic Route, PR-143, which leads to downtown Adjuntas and Barranquitas. As it continues north bypassing the town of Adjuntas, PR-10 intersects with PR-521 leading to downtown Adjuntas and to PR-143. The newer freeway alignment briefly continues north but comes to an abrupt end at a temporary terminus, requiring motorists to detour on the narrower PR-5516. After a short run south on PR-5516, a road signed PR-5518 continues the detour to PR-123, old PR-10,. The detour route continues north until it meets the new limited access PR-10.

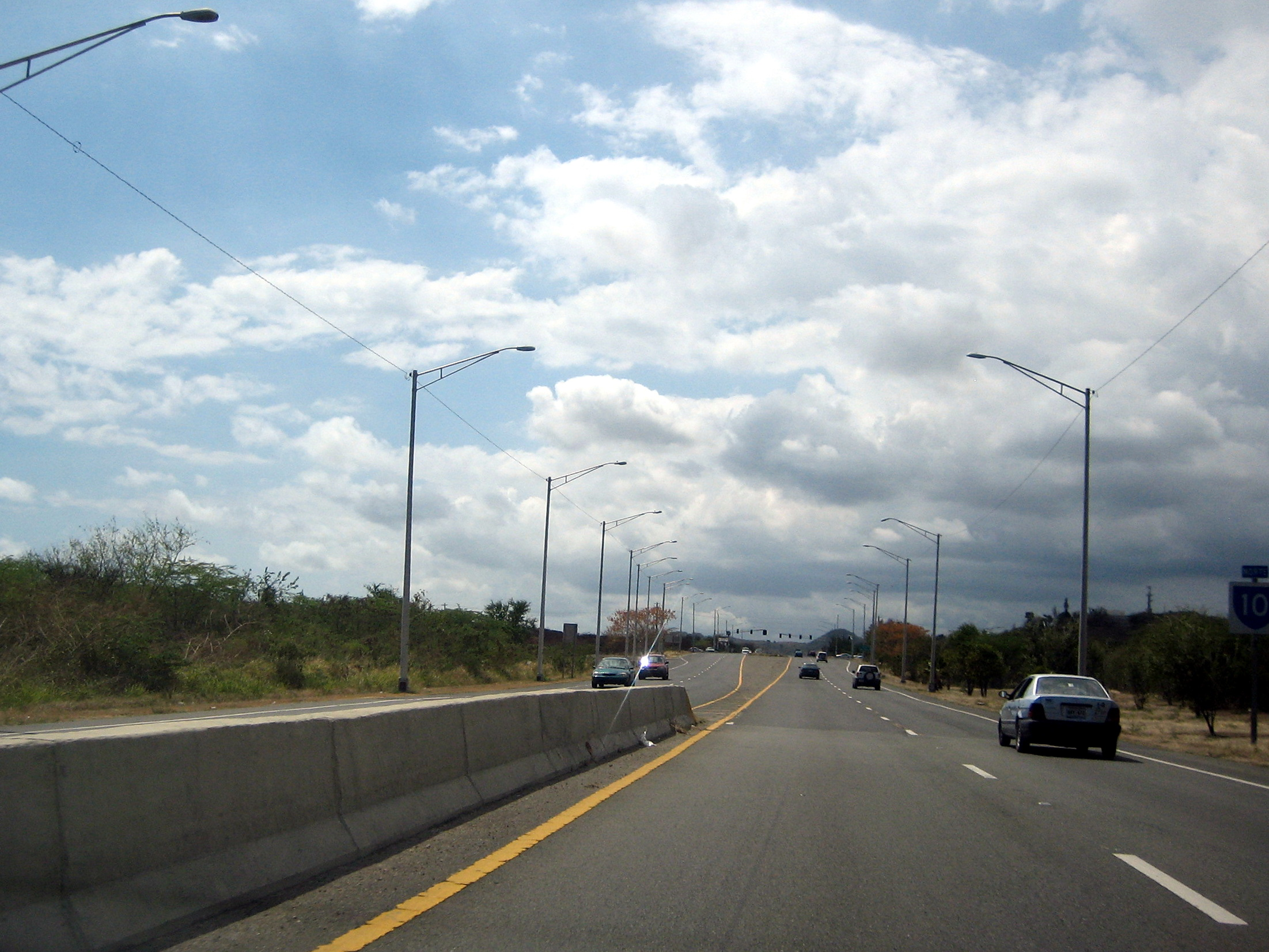
PR-10 north in Ponce

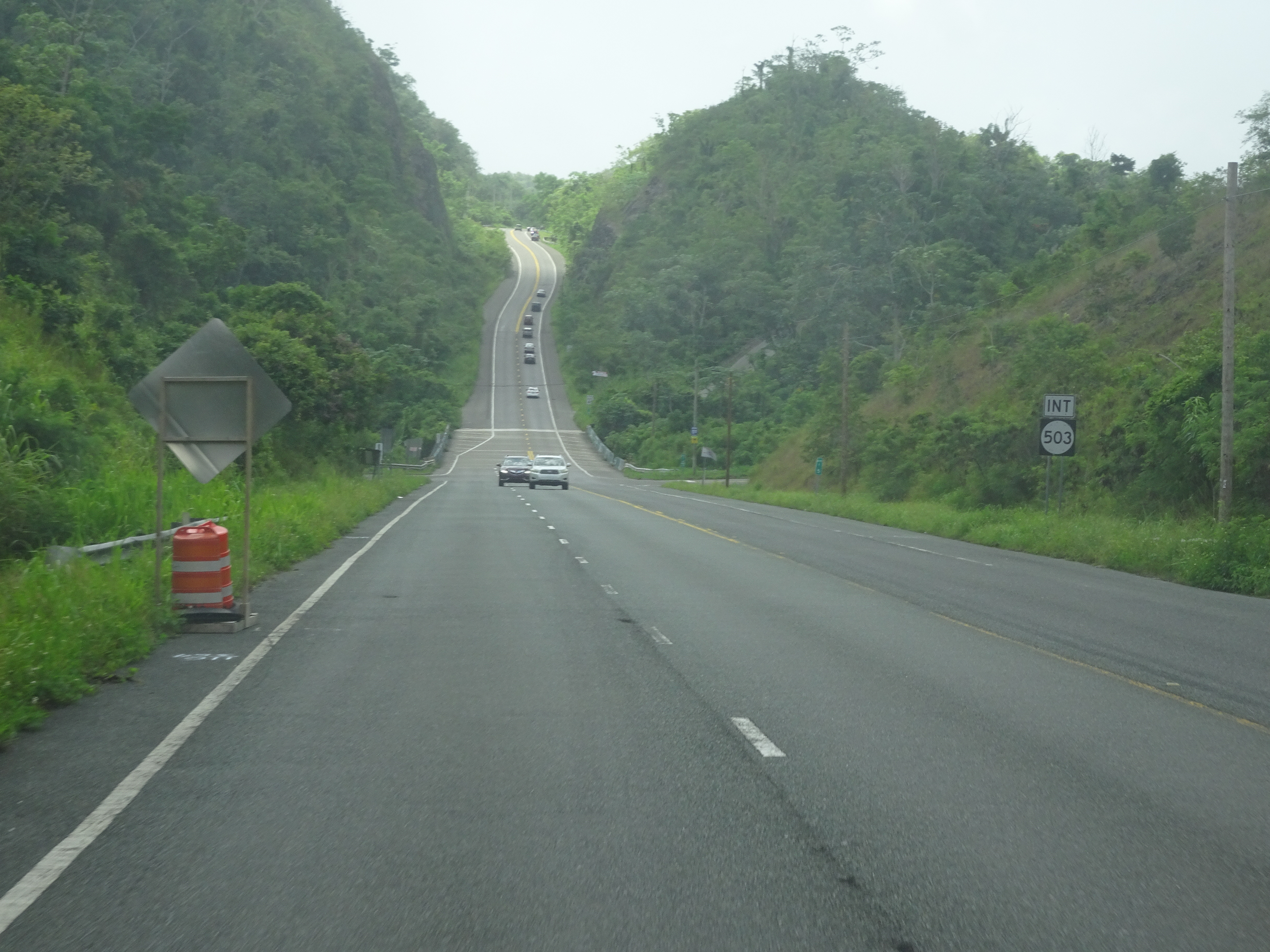
PR-10, near intersection with PR-503, Barrio Tibes, Ponce, Puerto Rico, looking south

=== Adjuntas to Utuado ===
PR-123/PR-10 is a curvy road that leads to Utuado, the next town before the new PR-10's terminus in Arecibo. At this point the road traverses some of the tallest peaks of the Cordillera Central. The older road has views of the nearby mountains, but probably not as good as the views from the new PR-10,. This is due to removing trees along the new road for shoulders, thus making for a clearer view.

PR-10 continues north, intersecting PR-135, which leads west to Lake Guayo, located between Adjuntas and Lares. It continues north for approximately 15 miles before reaching another section of new PR-10, just prior to the town of Utuado. In this stretch, construction of the realigned PR-10 is visible, alternating between the left and right sides of PR-123, as it carves through the mountains. The headwaters of Río Grande de Arecibo is near here, and the river -is visible mostly to the east of PR-123. PR-123 intersects with PR-524, which leads west to Jayuya. About one-half mile south of the town of Utuado, PR-123 intersects with PR-603, which connects to another section of realigned PR-10. This section7 bypasses downtown Utuado and heads towards Arecibo.

=== Utuado to Arecibo ===
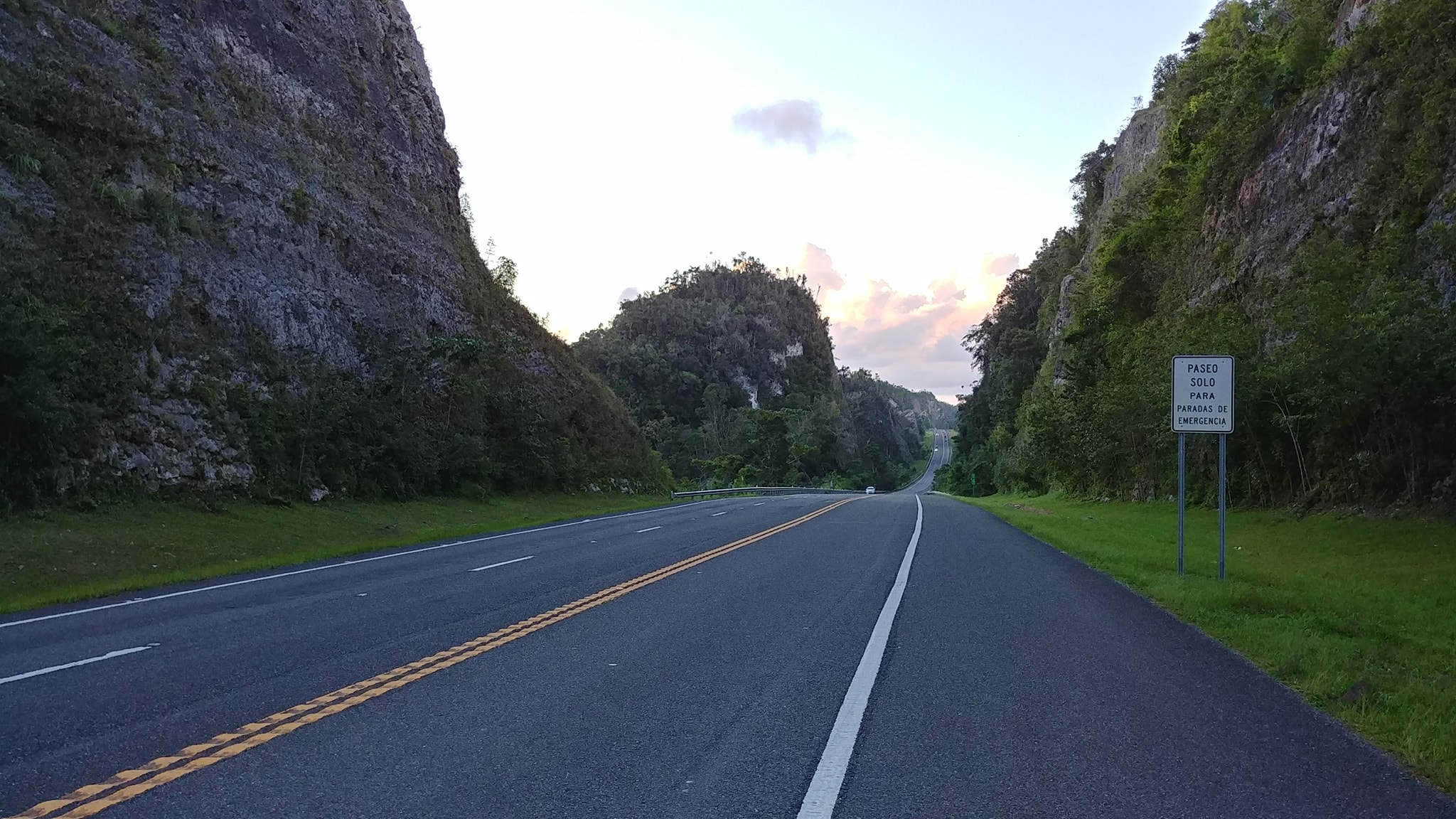
PR-10 north in Arecibo

PR-10 runs alongside Río Grande de Arecibo for several miles. The road intersects with PR-111 which leads west to the town of Lares, in the lower Central Karst Zone, and east to downtown Utuado and on to Caonillas Lake west of Utuado. The roads continues north where it intersects the old road to Arecibo, PR-123. Further north the road also intersects PR-621 which leads to PR-146 and Dos Bocas Lake, a major source of hydroelectricity. Traversing the Central Karst Zone, PR-10 follows a course parallel to Rio Grande de Arecibo. A connecting road, PR-6626 accesses PR-626, which leads to various rural Arecibo barrios. Continuing north, PR-10 descends from the mountains and enters Puerto Rico's northern coastal valleys. It intersects again with PR-123 acerca de San Pedro. Shortly after, the road becomes a divided highway. Further north, the road intersects PR-651 connecting to Hatillo, and PR-652, which accesses the 6barrios along the southern edge of the City of Arecibo, and leads to the former Arecibo Observatory. There is an interchange with PR-22, the main limited access highway on Puerto Rico's northern coast. A little over a mile later, PR-10 terminates at an intersection with PR-2.

== History ==
=== First road ===
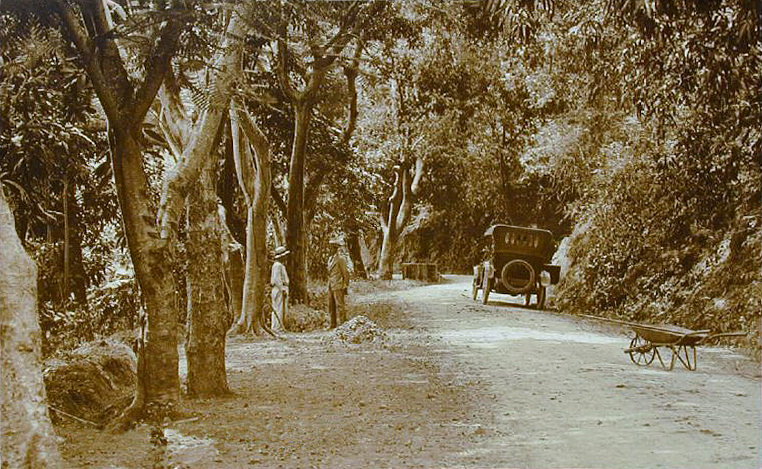
The Ponce–Adjuntas Road in Ponce circa 1920, now a section of PR-123 that is bypassed by PR-10

The history of PR-10 is closely linked to PR-123 (the old Ponce-to-Adjuntas Road) which predates it.

PR-123 dates to the late 19th century when it was built under the colonial government of Spain to connect the coffee-growing town of Adjuntas to the port city of Ponce as a farm-to-market road.

When the PR-10 road started construction in the mid-1970s, the then Ponce-Arecibo Road, which used to be signed PR-10, was resigned PR-123 and the new road was signed PR-10. Today, PR-10 signs refer to the new road, whereas PR-123 signs refer to the old road. The old road is roughly parallel to the new PR-10. The exception to this is in the area between the towns of Adjuntas and Utuado, where construction of PR-10 is not yet complete and traffic is detoured to use the PR-123. In that area PR-10 signs identify the old road. Prior to 1974, the full length of the old road was, in fact, signed PR-10. This route signing can still be seen in some old street maps of the city of Ponce. PR-10 is an alternate route to PR-123.

Navigating the old Ponce-Arecibo road was very tedious as the road was engineered to run from mountainside to mountainside, following the contours of the mountains, and along the natural definitions of the course of rivers, to reach its destination. Driving was rather hazardous, especially for trucks.

=== New road ===
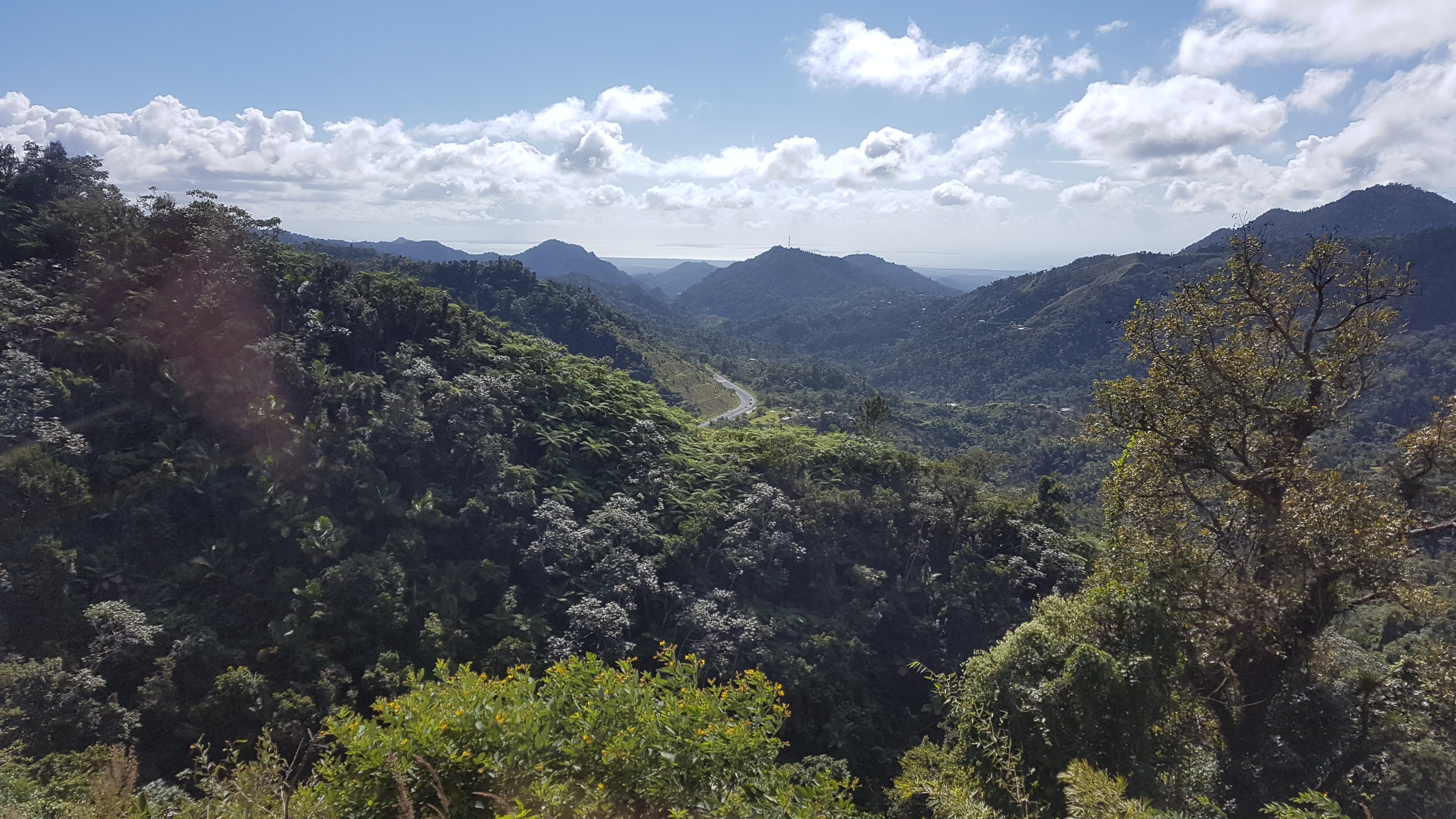
PR-10 can be seen in the distance as it makes its way through Barrio Guaraguao in Ponce, as seen from PR-143, Barrio San Patricio, looking south

One of the reasons to build a new road was the expected use by large trucks which the old road could not accommodate. Also, as traffic on the old road increased in the 1950s and 1960s, that road started to show its limits. To ameliorate the situation, in 1974 the Puerto Rico Department of Transportation and Public Works started planning for the construction this road to connect the cities of Ponce and Arecibo. While one of the main reasons to build the new PR-10 was to facilitate the movement of trucks in the mineral exploitation of the area, such exploitation met with considerable opposition from environmental advocates and today the road is being built to promote other types of socio-economic developments, such as those associated with the Port of the Americas.

PR-10 was inaugurated in the year 2000.

==== Cost ====
The new Puerto Rico Highway 10 is being built in three segments and, as of November 2010, only the middle segment remained to be built. The first segment, the road from Utuado to Arecibo was built at a cost of $120 million; the second segment, the road from Ponce to Adjuntas, was built at a cost of $80 million.

The remaining segment, from Adjuntas to Utuado, is partly complete. Due to the complexities of road-building in the remaining segment, this last segment is being built in nine phases. The first phase, consisting of 1.24 km of roadway, was completed at a cost of $7.9 million and opened to the public on 21 August 2009. Phases 2 and 3 were already also under construction at the time that the beginning of phase 4 was announced on 25 August 2010. Phase 4 will cost of $8.7 million. At that juncture, phase 5 was being readied for bidding. The last four phases were under engineering design in August 2010. The total cost of these last five phases (phases 5 through 9) is projected to be $179 million. During a 2013 presentation by the Puerto Rico DTOP, the last three Utuado-to-Adjuntas phases that were at that point in the design phase ("etapa de diseño"), and known as phases II, III, and IV (synonymous with former phases 7, 8, and 9), would cost $31.8M, $31.3M, and 34.5M, respectively, to build for a total cost-to-build of $97.6 million.

==== Travel time ====
The new road runs mostly parallel to PR-123, and for the area that is still under construction, motorists must use a stretch of PR-123 before reaching PR-10 again. The incomplete stretch will link Adjuntas to the mountain town of Utuado. It takes about half hour travel on PR-123 to reach the new PR-10 road, and about one hour and 20 minutes to travel the full length of the road from Ponce to Arecibo. Before the building of the new PR-10 highway, just the stretch from Utuado to Arecibo used to take one hour to travel; it now takes 15 minutes.

==== Possible addition of metal nets ====
On 8 November 2010, large rocks fell on a section of the new PR-10 in barrio Tibes leading to a 24-hour closure of the highway. It was the second time that heavy rains had caused rocks to fall onto the highway in a period of a few months. Meanwhile, northbound traffic was detoured to PR-515 and southbound traffic was detoured to PR-123, the old PR10-signed road. As a result, the Puerto Rico DTOP is assessing whether the area would be a candidate for the installation of metal nets that would minimize the possibility of further erosion.

==== Environmental concerns ====
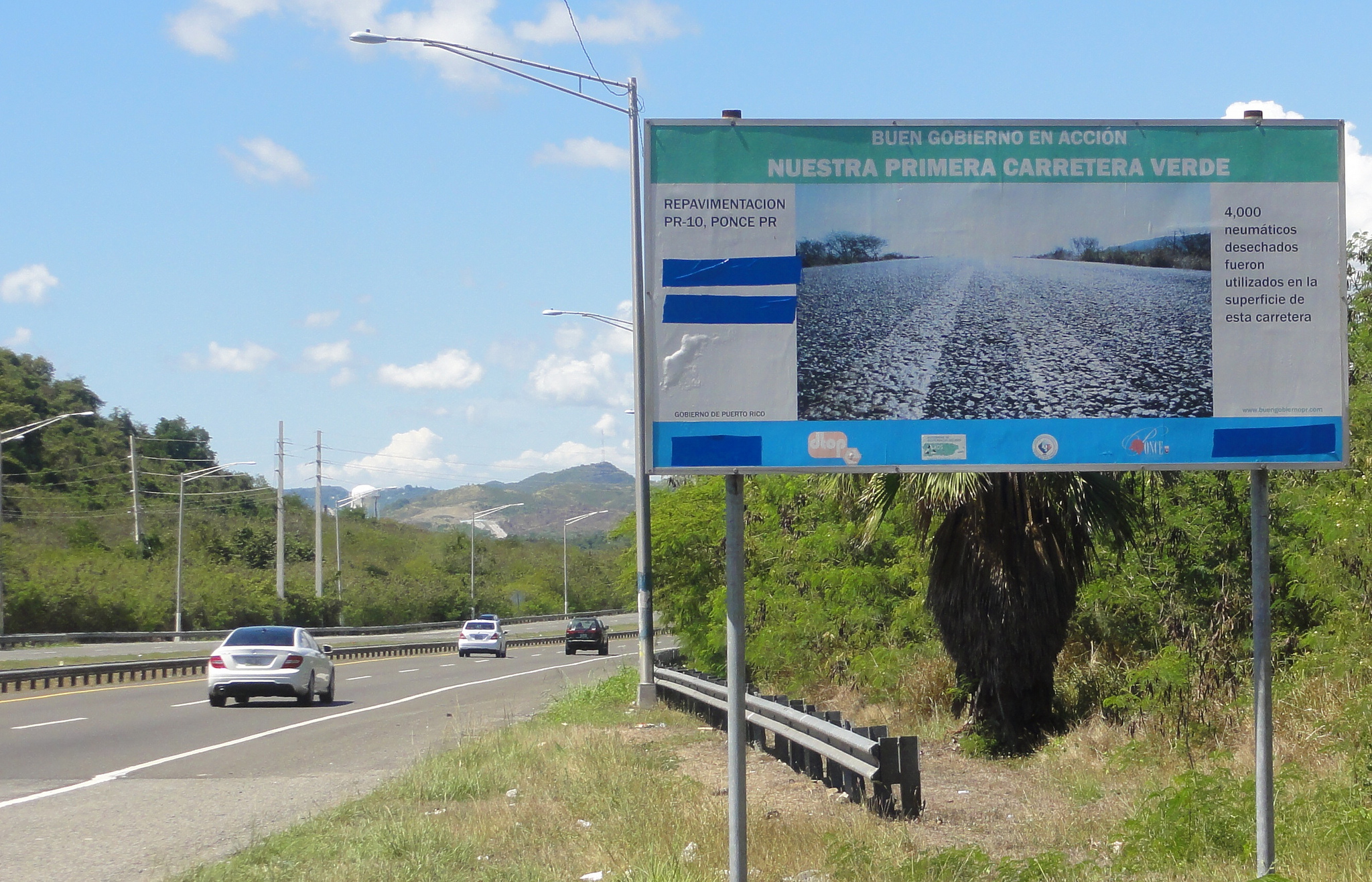
The roadside sign announces PR-10 as Puerto Rico's first green road

The building of the new PR-10 was an issue of contention based on environmental reasons related to the effect on the virgin Cordillera Central. When a group of American corporations attempted to lease land from the Government of Puerto Rico to exploit nickel, copper and cobalt mines, a grassroots effort by Puerto Rican townspeople had the government turn away from the idea. The plan had its roots in a so-called Plan 2020, the result of a study by a group of U.S. consultants eyeing economic regeneration for Puerto Rico at the expense of the environment.

The frequent rain and high humidity as well as the mountainous terrain of the area traversed by PR-10 make for a road building challenge for road engineers who have come to the use of recycled ground vehicular rubber tires as an innovative solution. The government calls PR-10 "Puerto Rico's first green road" for its use of recycled car tires to build the surface of the road.

=== Fate of the old road ===
No plans have been disclosed to close the old PR-123 after the new PR-10 construction project is complete, and PR-123 will likely serve mostly as a local route. Today, the old highway is signed as PR-123 in those stretches of the road where the newer PR-10 parallels it. As new stretches of the PR-10 road are completed and opened to traffic, the corresponding stretch of the old PR-10 road is being signed PR-123.

== Future ==
The new highway was anticipated to be completed by 2015 at a cost of $500 million, however remains incomplete at the present moment. When the new PR-10 highway is completed, travel time between Ponce and Arecibo will be significantly reduced. The new PR-10 provides a second safe route to cross the island from north to south, in addition to PR-52. Except for a 1.65-kilometer (1.03 mi) stretch of road between km 13.45 and km 15.10, where the road is only two lanes wide, the road is either a three- or four-lane highway. The road is listed as part of the National Highway System.

== Major intersections ==
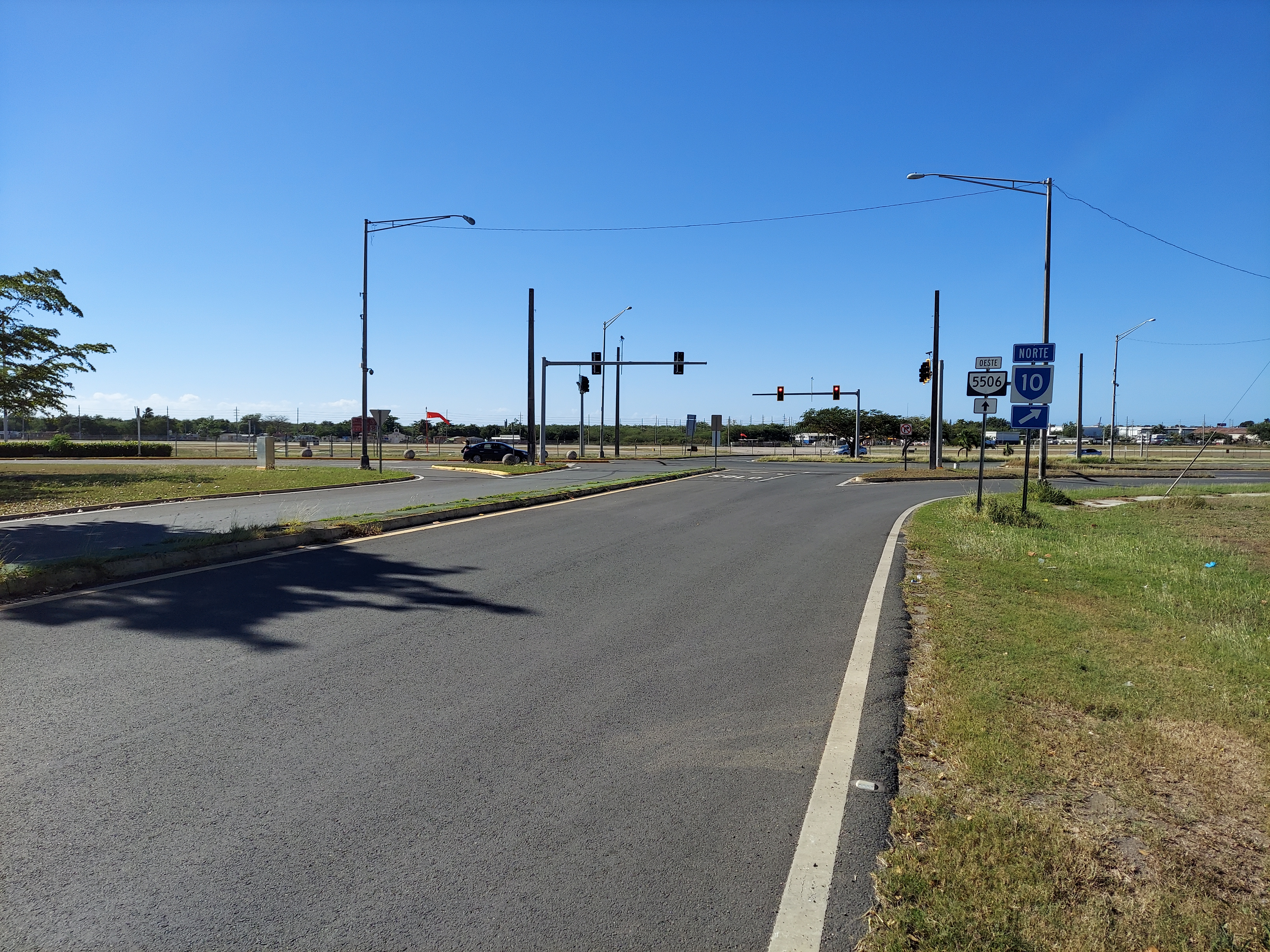
Southern terminus of PR-10 at PR-5506 intersection in Ponce

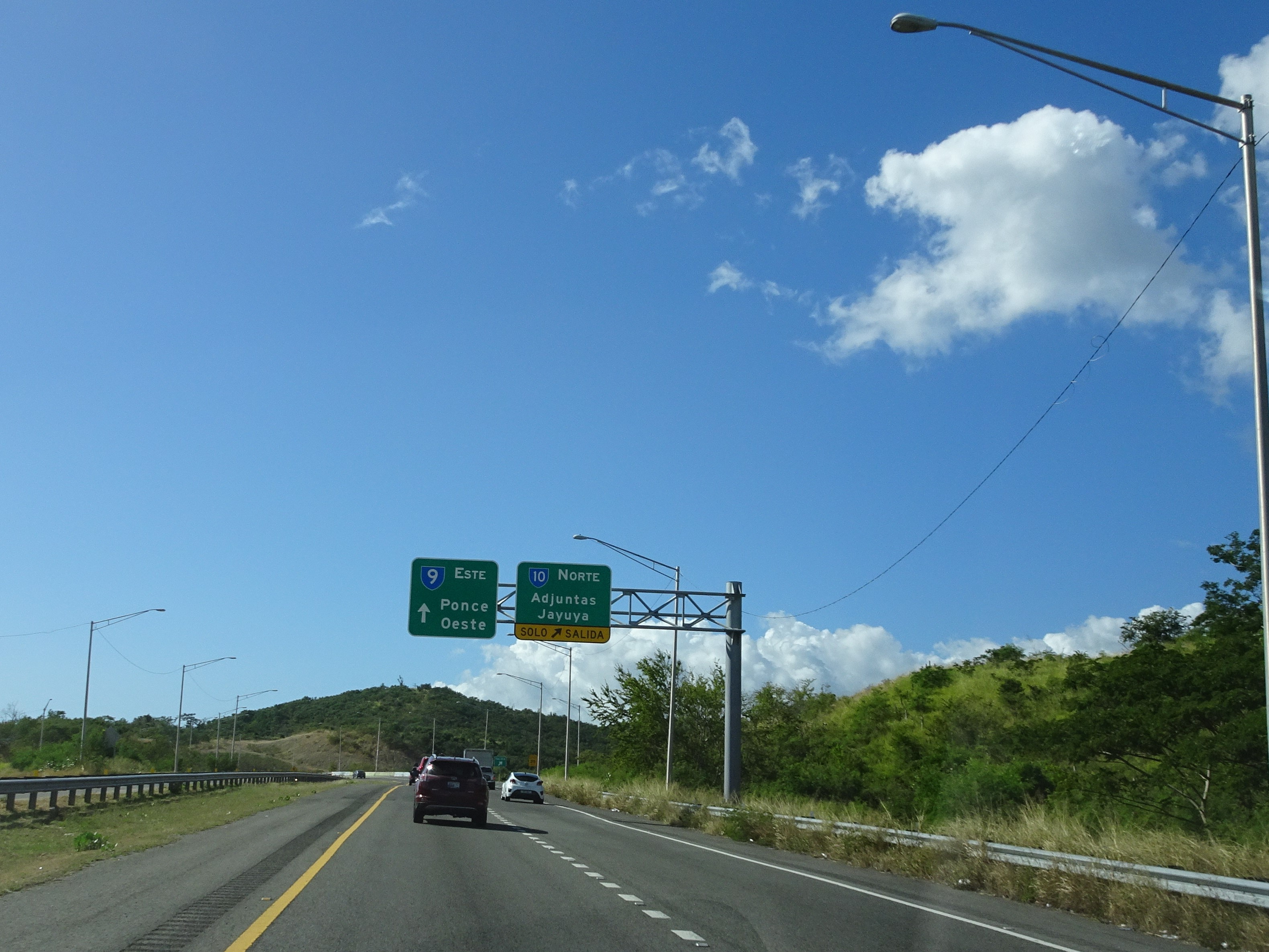
PR-10 north at PR-9 interchange in Ponce

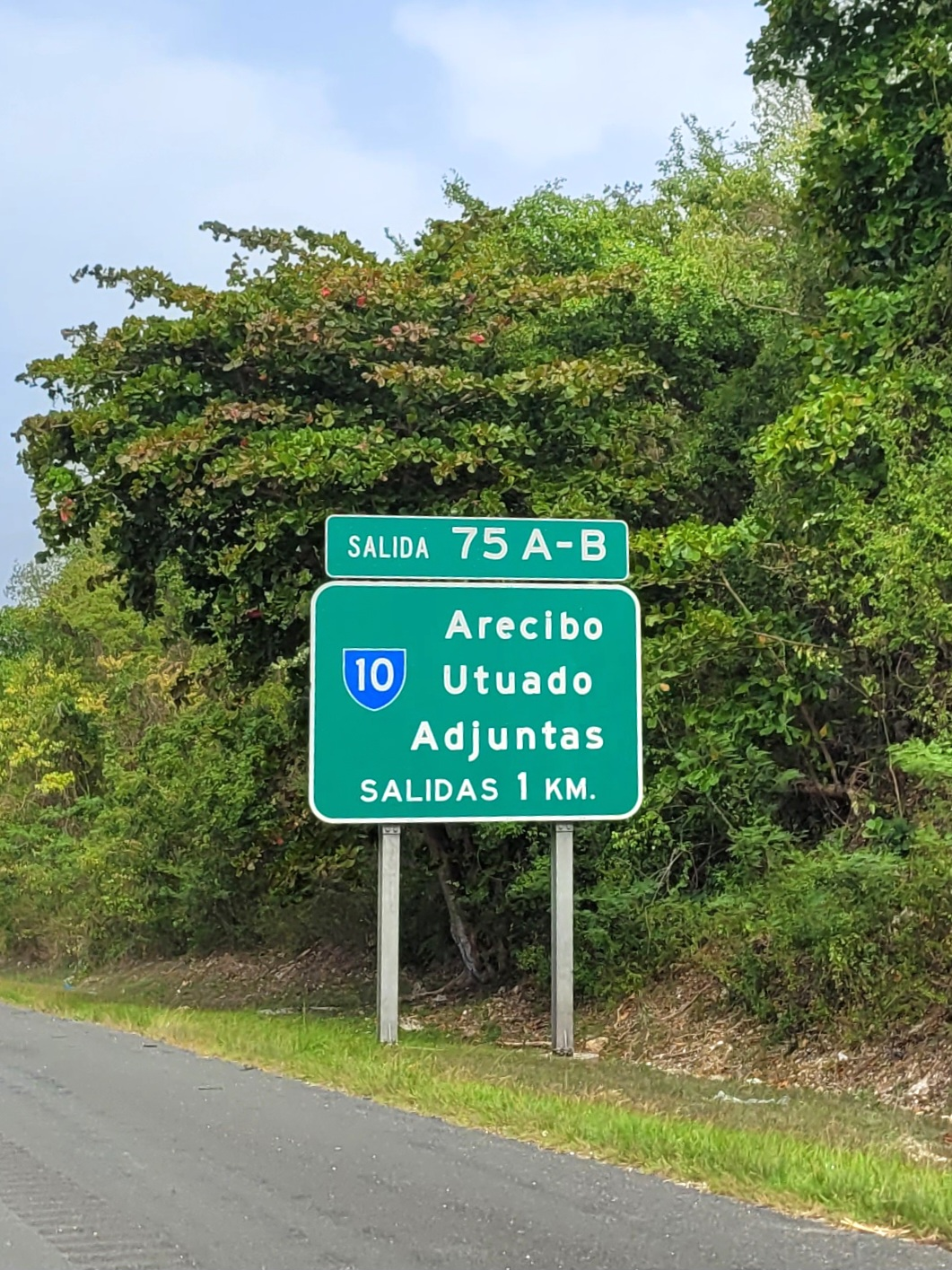
PR-22 east approaching PR-10 interchange in Arecibo

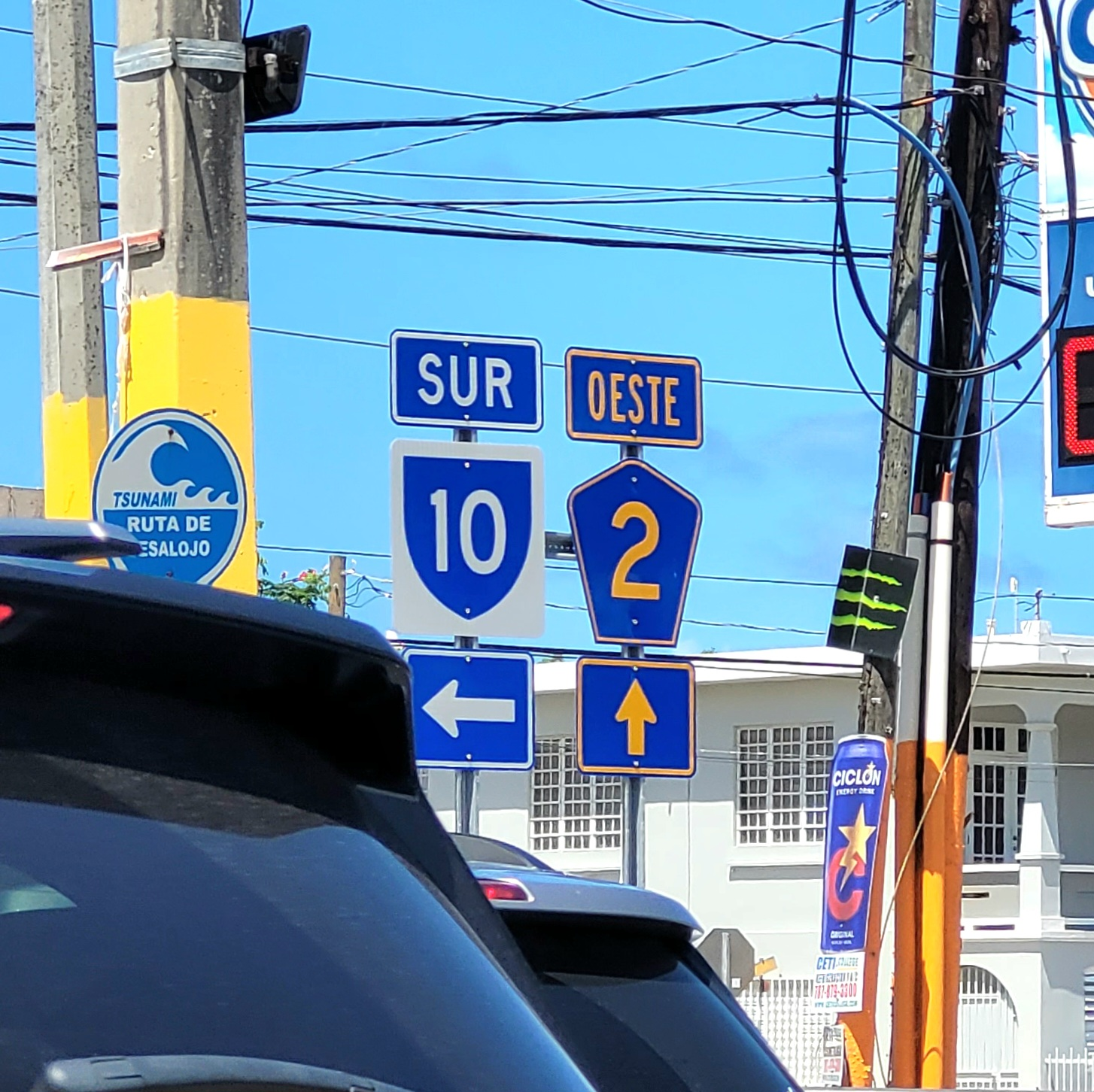
Northern terminus of PR-10 at PR-2 junction in Arecibo

| Municipality | Location | km | mi | Destinations | Notes |
|---|---|---|---|---|---|
| Ponce | Vayas–Sabanetas line | 0.0 | 0.0 | PR-5506 west – Santa Isabel | At-grade intersection; southern terminus of PR-10 and counterclockwise terminus of PR-5506; PR-1 access is via PR-5506 |
| Ponce | Vayas–Sabanetas line | 0.0 | 0.0 | Aeropuerto Mercedita (Avenida Aeropuerto), Central Mercedita (Calle La Esperanza) | At-grade intersection; southern terminus of PR-10 and counterclockwise terminus of PR-5506; PR-1 access is via PR-5506 |
| Ponce | Sabanetas | 1.9– 2.0 | 1.2– 1.2 | PR-52 – Juana Díaz, San Juan, Ponce Centro, Mayagüez | Cloverleaf interchange; PR-52 (unsigned PRI-1) exits 98A and 98B |
| Ponce | Machuelo Abajo–Machuelo Arriba line | 4.2– 4.3 | 2.6– 2.7 | PR-14 – Ponce Centro, Juana Díaz | Diamond interchange; PR-139 and PR-505 access is via PR-10 north entrance |
| Ponce | Machuelo Arriba | 5.4 | 3.4 | To PR-139 / PR-505 / PR-Avenida Emilio Fagot (unsigned) – Ponce Centro, Machuelo | At-grade intersection; Avenida Glenview access is via Avenida Emilio Fagot north |
| Ponce | Portugués | 7.0 | 4.3 | PR-503 – Tibes | Partial cloverleaf interchange; access to PR-504, Ponce Centro and the Tibes Indigenous Ceremonial Center |
| Ponce | Portugués | 8.2– 8.3 | 5.1– 5.2 | PR-9 west – Ponce Oeste | Trumpet interchange; northern end of freeway and southern end of expressway; northern terminus of PR-9 |
| Ponce | Tibes | 8.8 | 5.5 | PR-503 – Tibes, Machuelo | Access to the Tibes Indigenous Ceremonial Center and Sector La Vaquería |
| Ponce | Tibes | 13.2 | 8.2 | Pastillo Tibes (Camino La Zarza) | To PR-588 |
| Ponce | Tibes | 14.9 | 9.3 | PR-503 – La Jácana, Aguacate, Burene | Carretera David Medina Feliciano |
| Ponce | San Patricio | 18.5 | 11.5 | PR-515 – Guaraguao | Eastern terminus of PR-515 |
| Adjuntas | Saltillo | 24.3– 24.4 | 15.1– 15.2 | PR-143 (Ruta Panorámica Luis Muñoz Marín) – Jayuya, Barranquitas | Access to PR-123 and Bosque del Pueblo |
| Adjuntas | Vegas Abajo | 28.5– 28.6 | 17.7– 17.8 | PR-521 – Vegas Arriba | Adjuntas Centro access is via PR-521 west; the Garzas Water Filtration Plant is located at km 29.3 |
| Adjuntas | Juan González | 29.7– 29.8 | 18.5– 18.5 | PR-5516 east – Adjuntas Centro | Northern terminus of PR-5516 |
| Adjuntas | Juan González | 30.5 | 19.0 | PR-123 to PR-135 | Temporary northern terminus of southern segment; all northbound traffic must exit; access to Adjuntas Centro, Utuado and Lares |
Temporary gap in PR-10
| Utuado | Arenas | 38.2 | 23.7 | PR-123 – Utuado, Adjuntas | Temporary southern terminus of northern segment; all southbound traffic must exit |
| Utuado | Salto Arriba | 41.6 | 25.8 | To PR-123 / PR-6103 | Access to the former PR-603 and the University of Puerto Rico at Utuado |
| Utuado | Salto Abajo | 42.7 | 26.5 | PR-111 – Utuado, Lares, Caguana | Access to the Caguana Ceremonial Ball Courts Site and Hacienda Horizonte |
| Utuado | Salto Abajo | 43.8 | 27.2 | San Martín, Salto Abajo | To PR-123 |
| Utuado | Río Abajo | 48.4– 48.5 | 30.1– 30.1 | PR-6613 | Northern terminus of PR-6613 |
| Utuado | Río Abajo | 51.0 | 31.7 | PR-6612 to PR-621 – Río Abajo | Southern terminus of PR-6612; access to Río Abajo State Forest |
| Arecibo | Río Arriba | 53.3 | 33.1 | PR-621 – Florida, Ciales, Jobos | Access to Dos Bocas Lake |
| Arecibo | Hato Viejo | 60.5 | 37.6 | PR-6626 to PR-626 – Calichoza, Esperanza | Eastern terminus of PR-6626 |
| Arecibo | Hato Viejo | 62.0 | 38.5 | PR-123 – Hato Viejo, Carreras | Partial cloverleaf interchange; northern terminus of PR-123 and southern terminus of PR-6609; no access to PR-6609 from southbound |
| Arecibo | Tanamá | 64.2 | 39.9 | PR-636 – Charco Hondo, La Planta, Macelo | Eastern terminus of PR-636 |
| Arecibo | Tanamá | 65.4 | 40.6 | PR-651 – Tanamá, Central Los Caños | Clockwise terminus of PR-651 |
| Arecibo | Tanamá | 66.6 | 41.4 | PR-6109 | Northern terminus of PR-6109 (former PR-6609) |
| Arecibo | Tanamá | 67.1 | 41.7 | PR-652 – Higuillar, Dominguito | Eastern terminus of PR-652; access to the Arecibo Observatory |
| Arecibo | Tanamá | 68.3 | 42.4 | PR-22 – Bayamón, San Juan, Manatí, Aguadilla, Mayagüez, Hatillo | Cloverleaf interchange; PR-22 (unsigned PRI-2) exits 75A and 75B |
| Arecibo | Tanamá | 69.0 | 42.9 | Calle Ingeniero Manuel T. Guillán | |
| Arecibo | Arecibo barrio-pueblo | 70.1 | 43.6 | PR-2 – Mayagüez, San Juan | Northern terminus of PR-10 |
1.000 mi = 1.609 km; 1.000 km = 0.621 mi: Incomplete access; Route transition; Unopened

== See also ==
- List of highways in Ponce, Puerto Rico
- Anillo de Circunvalación de Ponce
