= Puerto Rico Highway 123 =

Highway in Puerto Rico

Highway 123
- Ruta 123

Route information
- Maintained by Puerto Rico DTPW
- Length: 78.40 km (48.72 mi)
- Existed: circa 1910–present

Major junctions
- South end: PR-12 in Playa
- PR-2 in Playa; PR-163 in Canas Urbano; PR-14 / PR-123P in Primero–Cuarto; PR-1 in Primero–Segundo; PR-132 in Canas Urbano; PR-9 in Magueyes Urbano; PR-143 in Saltillo; PR-135 in Juan González; PR-111 in Utuado barrio-pueblo; PR-146 in Río Arriba
- North end: PR-10 / PR-6609 in Hato Viejo

Location
- Country: United States
- Territory: Puerto Rico
- Municipalities: Ponce, Adjuntas, Utuado, Arecibo

Highway system
- Roads in Puerto Rico; List
← PR-122	→ PR-124
- Carretera Núm. 6
- U.S. National Register of Historic Places
- Location: Ponce, Puerto Rico
- Built: 19th-century
- NRHP reference No.: 100006919
- Added to NRHP: September 14, 2021

Puerto Rico Highway 123 (PR-123) is a secondary highway that connects the city of Arecibo to the city of Ponce. It runs through the towns of Utuado and Adjuntas, before reaching Ponce. A parallel road is being built, PR-10, that is expected to take on most of the traffic currently using PR-123.

== Route description ==
With a length of about 78.40 kilometers (48.72 mi), PR-123 begins in Ponce at PR-12 in Barrio Playa. Then, PR-123 enters the Ponce Historic Zone, where meets with some important highways as PR-14 and PR-1. After downtown, the highway climbs the mountains of the Cordillera Central north of Ponce to enter Adjuntas.

In Adjuntas, the highway passes through the city center, and further north, it intersects with PR-10. After the intersection, the highway descends a slope until it enters Utuado. In Utuado, PR-123 rejoins PR-10 and then enters the city center, where it meets PR-111. After this intersection, the highway continues down the mountains toward Arecibo, where it rejoins PR-10, ending its south-to-north run.

== History ==
The road dates from the late 19th century and it started as a road to link the coffee-farming mountain town of Adjuntas to the southern port city of Ponce for the export of coffee. (Eventually the road was completed to the smaller northern port city of Arecibo as well, connecting the mountain town of Utuado in its way.) PR-123 was built under the colonial government of Spain in Puerto Rico to connect the coffee-growing town of Adjuntas to the port city of Ponce as a farm-to-market road. By the early 20th century, it was already graced with many bungalow-style summerhouses.

The construction of the first Ponce-to-Adjuntas road got underway through the dedicated efforts of local political leader, attorney, and composer Olimpio Otero in the late nineteenth century. In 1887, the Ponce Municipal Assembly issued a resolution to use vagrants in the construction of this road, to add to the labor already being performed by prisoners. In 1903, the Puerto Rico Legislature named a bridge on the Ponce to Adjuntas section of the road to his memory for his outstanding dedication to the building of that stretch of the road. The bridge is located in the Magueyes barrio of the municipality of Ponce. During his 1910 surveys, American surveyor William H. Armstrong called the road "a beautiful work of engineering." According to Armstrong, the road was 29 kilometers long and had 87 bridges and culverts.

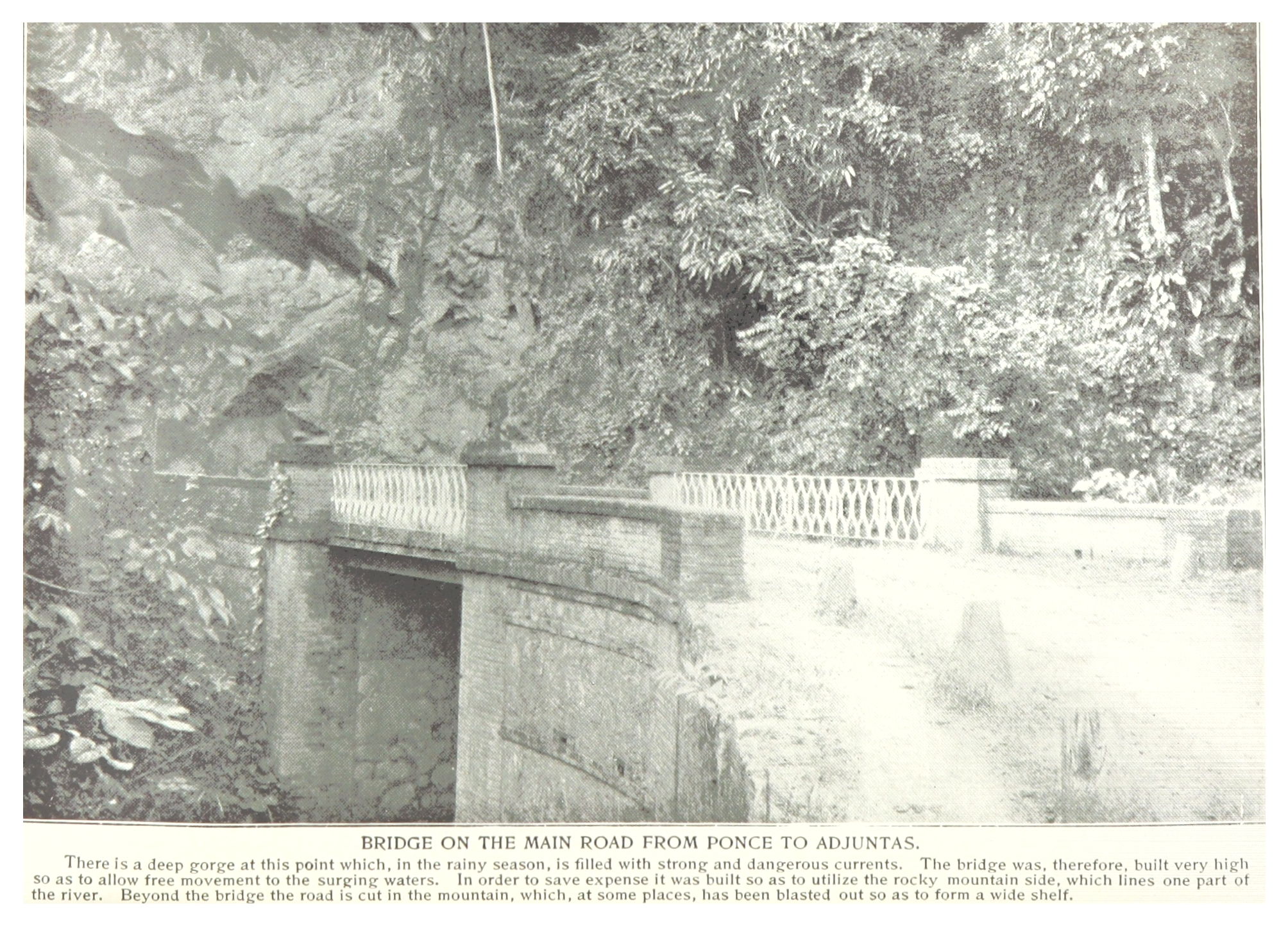
Bridge on the PR-123 road from Ponce to Adjuntas, ca. 1890s

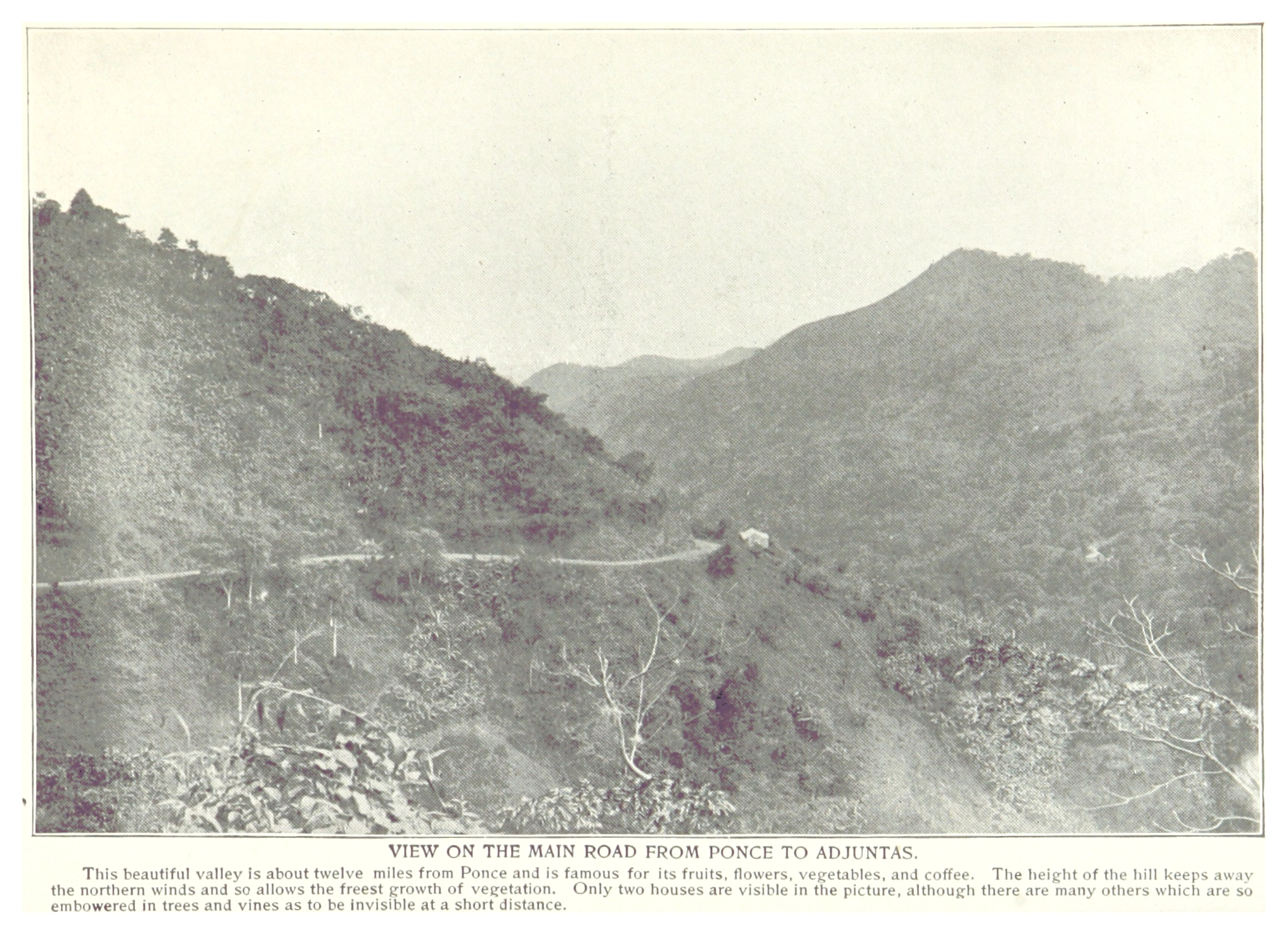
The Ponce-Adjuntas Road in Ponce in 1899

True to its farm-to-market purpose, PR-123 was designed to descend from the mountain town of Adjuntas and make its way through the Cordillera Central until it reached the city of Ponce, edging Plaza Las Delicias, located just two blocks from the Plaza del Mercado de Ponce fruits-and-vegetables central market place. The road then continued south, via Avenida Hostos, to the port of Ponce where coffee and other farm products were shipped to the United States and Europe. Under the Plan Ponce en Marcha, Avenida Hostos will be enlarged from two to four lanes.

PR-123 was signed PR-10 until a new and wider parallel road was built (see PR-10) which adopted its number. This route signing for this old, winding road can still be seen in some old street maps of the city of Ponce.

The stretch from Ponce to Adjuntas was built under the Spanish government. The remainder of the route to Arecibo was built after the Americans took over in 1898. This second stretch opened on July 1, 1904. The whole course of the road from its southern end in Ponce to its northern end in Arecibo was signed as Road No. 6 in those days.

Navigating this first PR-10 road was very tedious as the road was engineered to run from mountainside to mountainside, following the contours of the mountains, and along the natural definitions of the course of rivers, to reach its destination. Such design, however, limited considerably the speed of travel. It was also necessary to drive through the congested downtown areas of the various towns and villages in the way to get from one terminus of the road to the other, something that proved to be very time-consuming as vehicular traffic in those towns and villages increased. Despite these drawbacks, the road was heavily used for many decades. However, as traffic on this road increased in the 1950s and 1960s, the road started to show its limits.

The completed road had a length of 82 km.

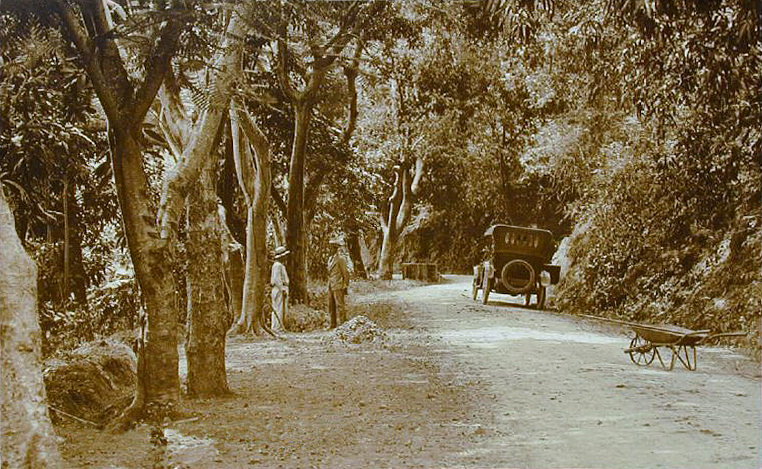
The Ponce–Adjuntas Road in Ponce in 1920, now a section of PR-123

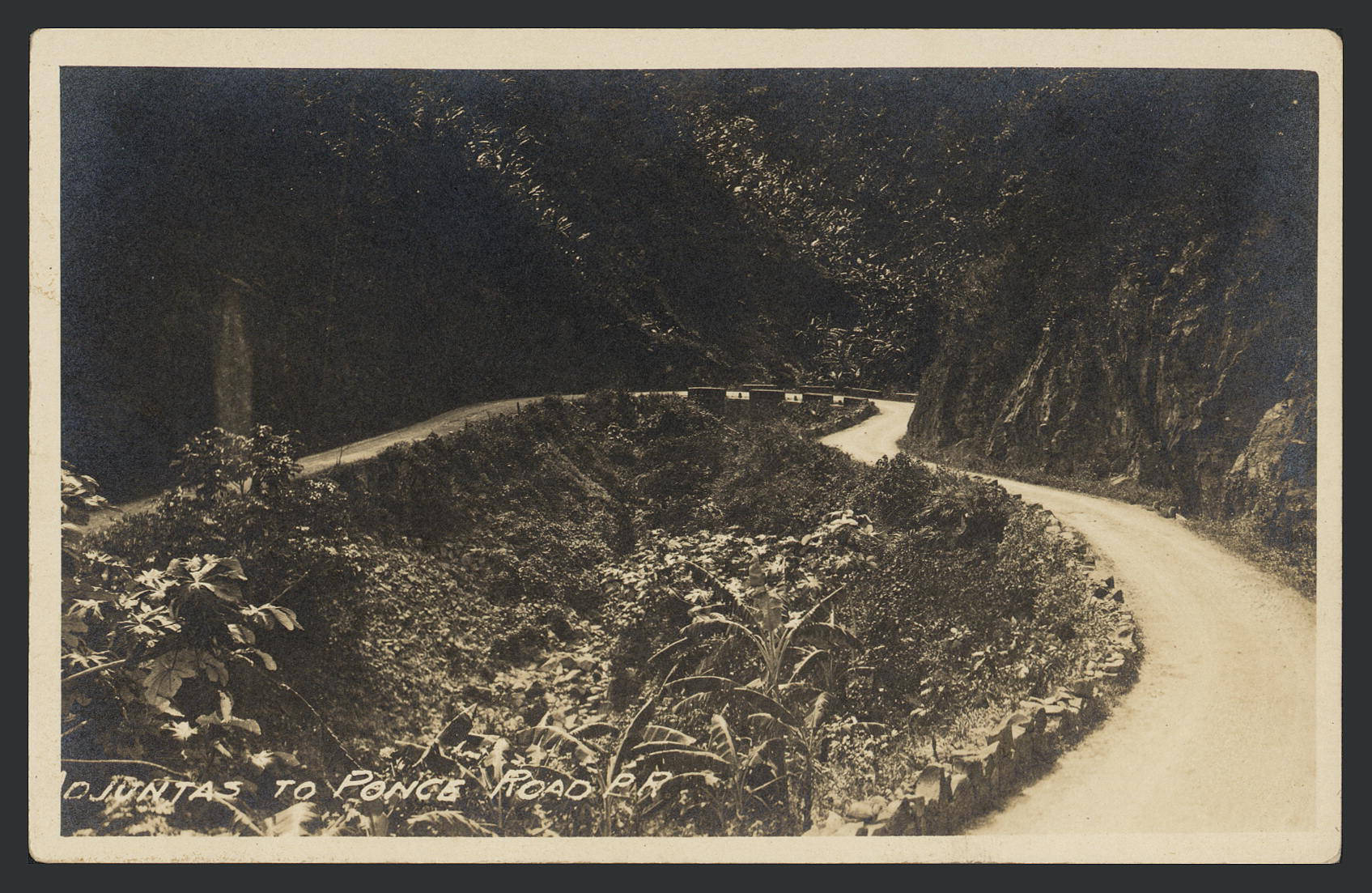
Another view of a section of the Ponce-Adjuntas Road in 1920

=== Construction details ===
The road was built in 13 segments as follows:

PR-123 construction details by section
Section No.	Begin km (mi)	End km (mi)	Length	Town	Builder(s)	Year begun	Year ended	Cost
1	0.0 (0)	15.0 (9.3)	15.0 (9.3)	Ponce	Spain	unknown	pre-1898	$146,333.08
2	15.0 (9.3)	21.0 (13.0)	6.0 (3.7)	–	PR		1903	$90,000.00
3	21.0 (13.0)	24.0 (14.9)	3.0 (1.9)	–	US	unknown	1901	$42,527.28
4	24.0 (14.9)	24.3 (15.1)	0.3 (0.19)	–	Spain/US	<1898	1900	$17,451.21
5	24.3 (15.1)	30.1 (18.7)	5.8 (3.6)	Adjuntas	US	unknown	1901	$85,053.72
6	30.1 (18.7)	32.0 (19.9)	1.9 (1.2)	–	US	unknown	1900	$28,858.92 (Note: Segment No. 6 funds were used to build segment No. 7 as well.)
7	32.0 (19.9)	38.0 (23.6)	6.0 (3.7)	–	PR	1899	unknown	* (Note: Segment No. 7 was built with funds from segment No. 6.)
8	38.0 (23.6)	43.2 (26.8)	5.2 (3.2)	–	PR	unknown	1903	$79,000.00
9	43.2 (26.8)	50.5 (31.4)	7.3 (4.5)	Utuado	PR	1899	1926?	$118,006.19
10	50.5 (31.4)	55.0 (34.2)	4.5 (2.8)	–	Spain	unknown	1876	$115,224.98
11	55.0 (34.2)	64.3 (40.0)	9.3 (5.8)	–	PR	1901	1926?	$123,658.67
12	64.3 (40.0)	69.0 (42.9)	4.7 (2.9)	–	PR	<1898	1901	$36,520.00
13	69.0 (42.9)	81.5 (50.6)	12.5 (7.8)	Arecibo	PR	1898	1902	$125,850.23

=== Characteristics ===
The road is prone to landslides and closings due to frequent heavy rains.

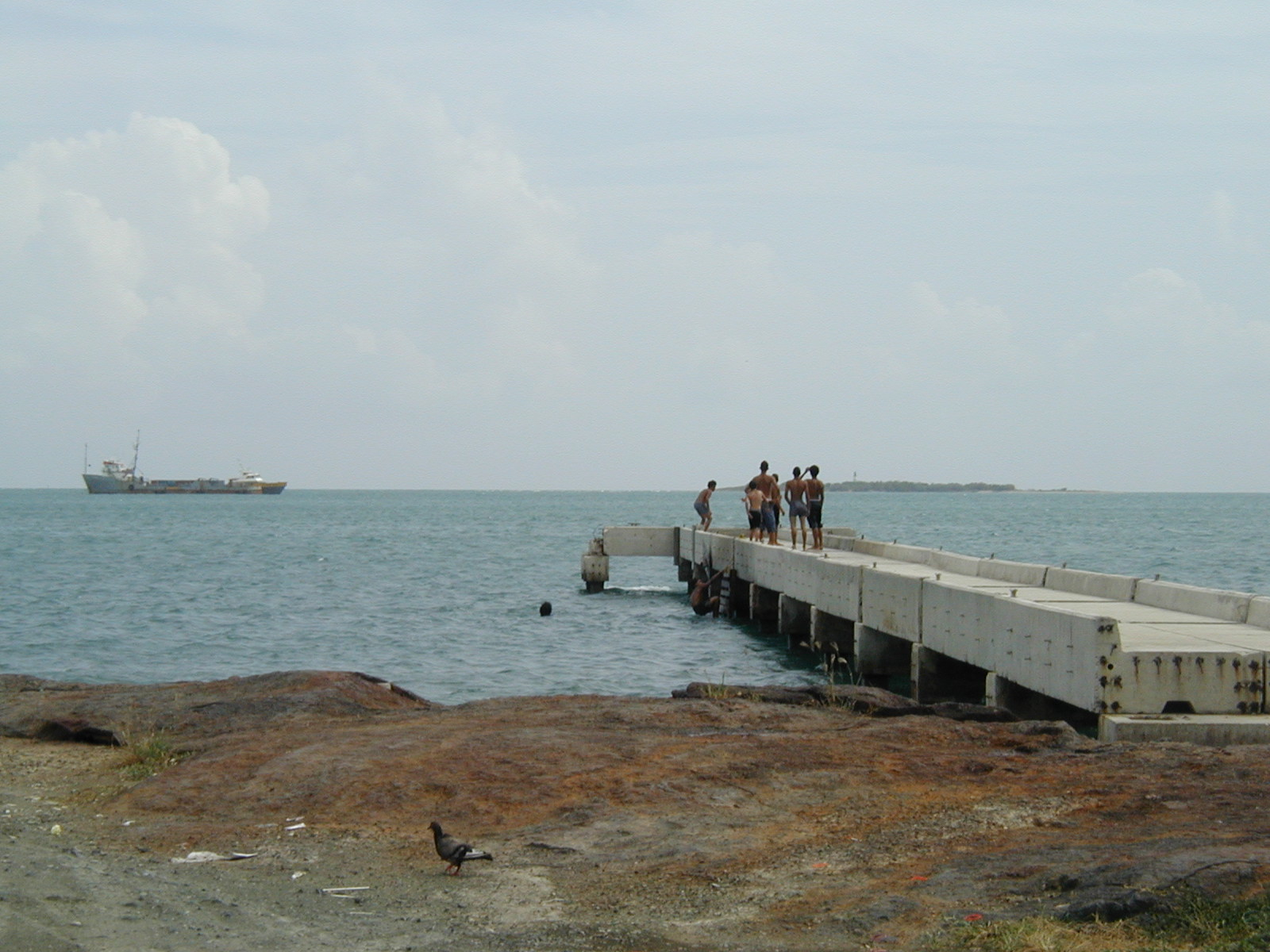
Pier at the end of PR-123, near El Ancla in Playa, Ponce - near the Southern terminus of PR-123

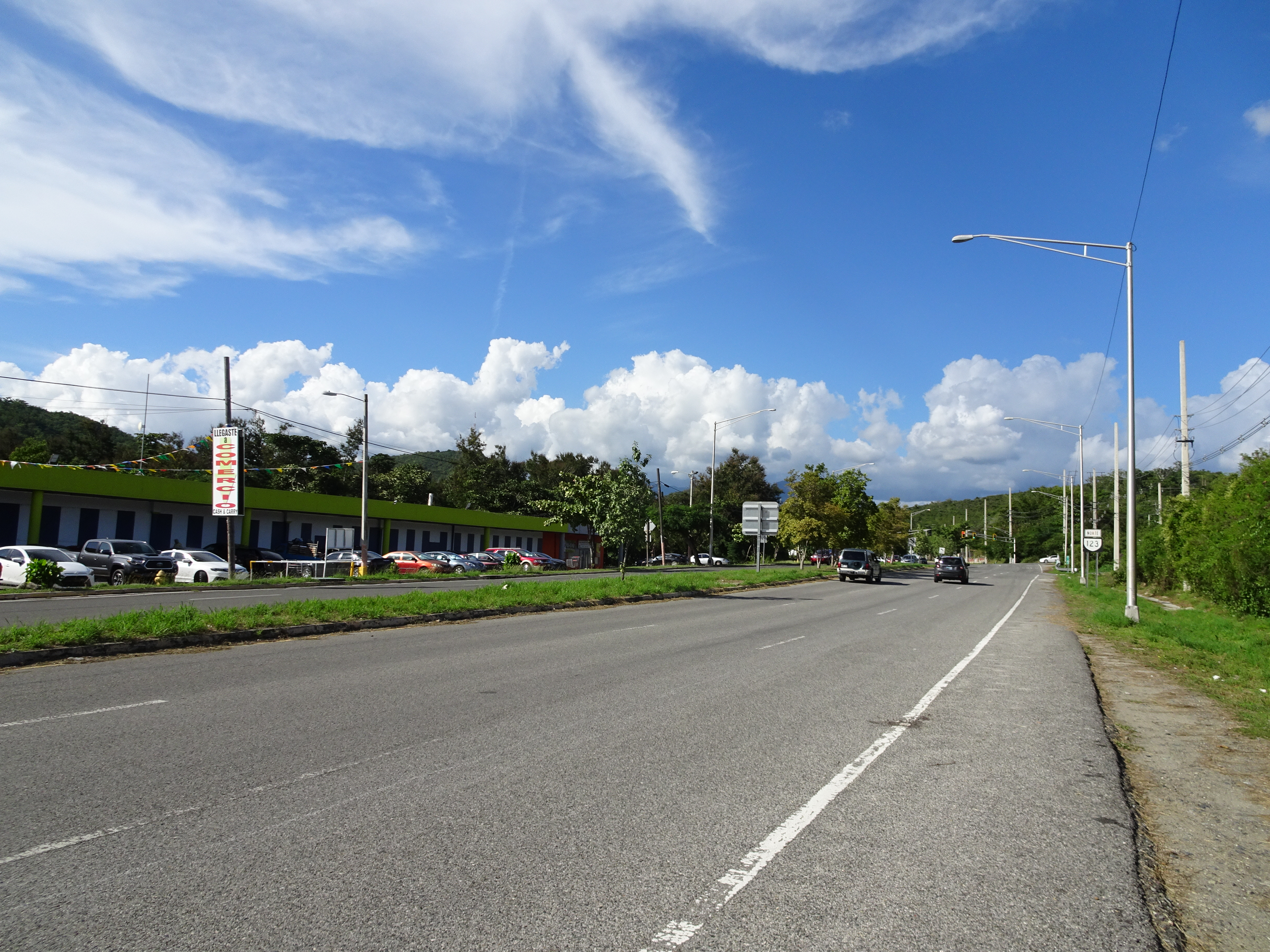
PR-123, north of PR-9 in Barrio Magueyes, Ponce, Puerto Rico, looking north

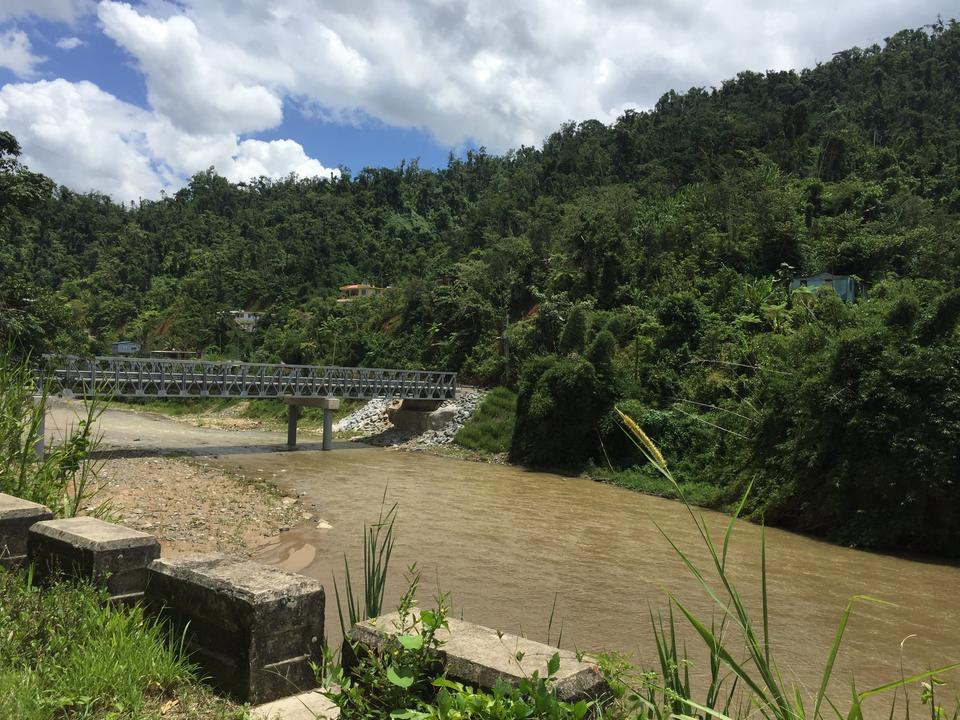
Río de Caguana as seen from PR-123 in Utuado

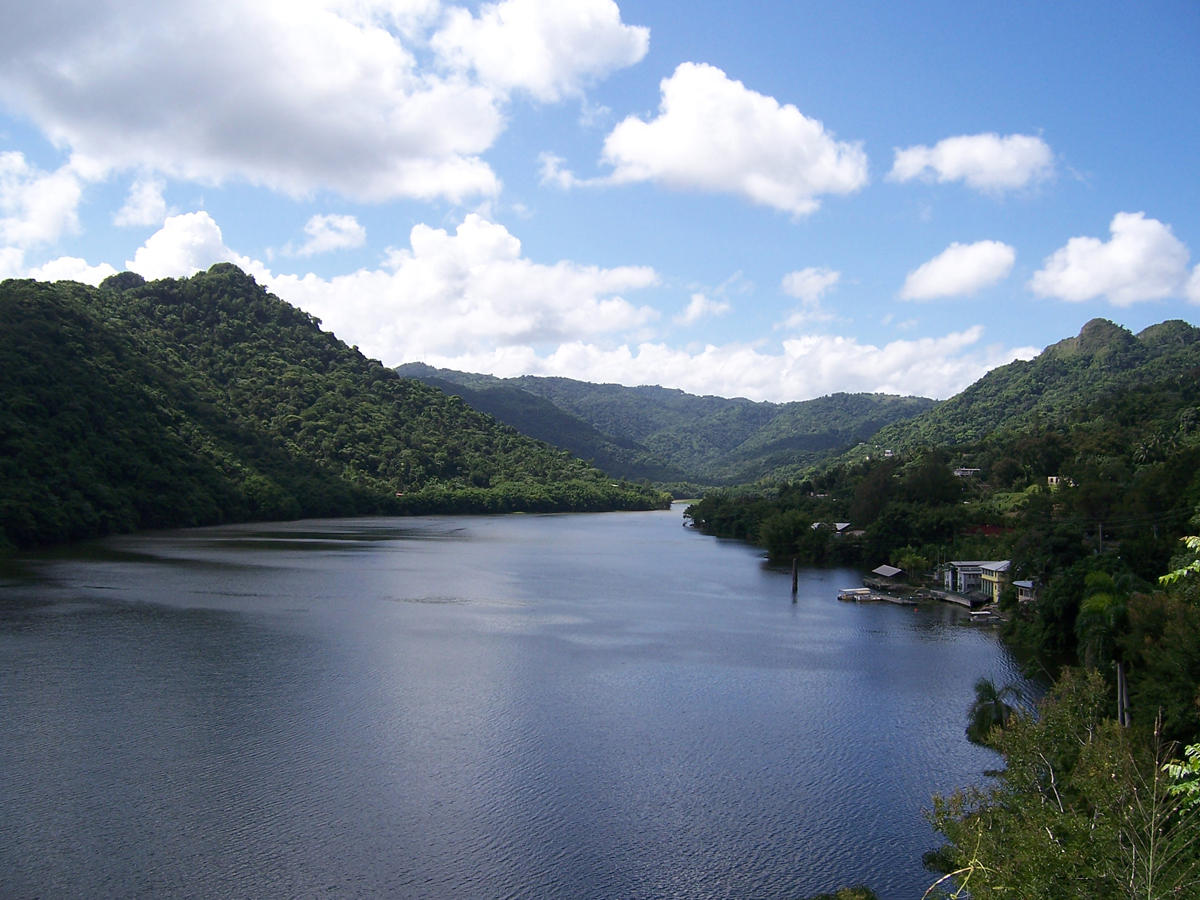
Lago Dos Bocas, view from the bridge on the dam facing south, PR-123

== Major intersections ==
Municipality	Location	km	mi	Destinations	Notes
Ponce	Playa	0.0	0.0	PR-12 (Avenida Santiago de los Caballeros) – Ponce	Southern terminus of PR-123
Ponce	Playa	1.6	0.99	Southern terminus of the Carretera Central	
Ponce	Playa	1.7– 1.8	1.1– 1.1	PR-585 north (Avenida Padre Noel) – Ponce	
Ponce	Playa	3.2	2.0	Puente del Río Portugués over the Río Portugués	
Ponce	Playa	3.5	2.2	PR-2 (Ponce Bypass) – Mayagüez, San Juan	
Ponce	Canas Urbano	4.3– 4.4	2.7– 2.7	PR-163 (Bulevar Luis A. Ferré Aguayo) – Mayagüez, San Juan	
Ponce	Primero–Cuarto line	4.6	2.9	PR-14 north (Calle Salud) / PR-123P south (Calle Ferrocarril) – Ponce	One-way streets; the Carretera Central continues toward Juana Díaz; PR-123P southbound access via Calle Aurora
Ponce	Primero–Cuarto– Segundo–Tercero quadripoint	5.2	3.2	PR-1P (Calle Marina) / PR-133 east (Calle Comercio) – Ponce	One-way streets
Ponce	Primero–Segundo line	5.3	3.3	PR-14R (Calle Unión) / PR-123P south (Calle Concordia) – Ponce	One-way streets; PR-14R northbound access via PR-14
Ponce	Primero–Segundo line	5.5	3.4	PR-1 (Calle Simón de la Torre) – Ponce	One-way street; northbound access via PR-1P
Ponce	Segundo–Canas Urbano– Primero tripoint	6.3	3.9	PR-2R south (Carretera Pámpanos) – Guayanilla	
Ponce	Canas Urbano	7.3	4.5	PR-132 west – Peñuelas	
Ponce	Magueyes Urbano	9.8	6.1	PR-9 (Ronda de Circunvalación Roman Baldorioty de Castro) – Ponce, Adjuntas	
Ponce	Magueyes	10.9	6.8	PR-501 – Marueño	
Ponce	Guaraguao	21.6	13.4	PR-501 – Guaraguao	
Ponce	Guaraguao	24.4	15.2	PR-515 – Guaraguao	
Ponce	Guaraguao	25.0– 25.1	15.5– 15.6	PR-516 – Guaraguao	
Adjuntas	Saltillo	30.6	19.0	PR-143 (Ruta Panorámica) – Barranquitas	Southern terminus of the Ruta Panorámica concurrency; the Ruta Panorámica continues toward Utuado
Adjuntas	Adjuntas barrio-pueblo	34.3	21.3	PR-518 (Ruta Panorámica) – Saltillo	Northern terminus of the Ruta Panorámica concurrency; the Ruta Panorámica continues toward Lares
Adjuntas	Adjuntas barrio-pueblo	35.3– 35.4	21.9– 22.0	PR-521 (Calle Luis Muñoz Rivera) / PR-5516 north (Calle Rodulfo González) – Utuado	One-way streets; PR-521 access via Calle Rius Rivera
Adjuntas	Adjuntas barrio-pueblo	35.7– 35.8	22.2– 22.2	Puente Chavier over the Río Cidra	
Adjuntas	Garzas	37.5	23.3	PR-522 – Garzas	
Adjuntas	Juan González	37.7	23.4	PR-5518 east to PR-10 (Carretera Rigoberto "Pucho" Ramos Aquino) – Ponce	
Adjuntas	Juan González	38.0	23.6	PR-135 west (Carretera Francisco L. Báez Cruz) – Lares	
Adjuntas	Juan González	38.1	23.7	PR-10 (Carretera Rigoberto "Pucho" Ramos Aquino) – Ponce	One-way ramp; southbound access via PR-5518
Adjuntas	Pellejas	44.7	27.8	PR-524 – Pellejas	
Utuado	Arenas	48.7	30.3	Puente Blanco over the Río Pellejas	
Utuado	Arenas	49.5	30.8	PR-10 north (Carretera Félix Ramón "Moncho" Estévez Datis) – Utuado, Arecibo	
Utuado	Arenas	53.5	33.2	PR-6103 to PR-10 (Carretera Félix Ramón "Moncho" Estévez Datis) – Arecibo	
Utuado	Utuado barrio-pueblo	55.4– 55.5	34.4– 34.5	PR-5523 – Arenas	
Utuado	Utuado barrio-pueblo	55.5– 55.6	34.5– 34.5	PR-6111 (Avenida Guillermo Esteves) – Utuado	
Utuado	Utuado barrio-pueblo	55.6– 55.7	34.5– 34.6	Puente de Utuado over the Río Grande de Arecibo	
Utuado	Utuado barrio-pueblo	55.7 60.6 (Note: Kilometer markers represent the distance along PR-111 rather than PR-123.)	34.6 37.7	PR-111 east (Avenida Fernando L. Ribas Dominicci) – Jayuya	Eastern terminus of PR-111 concurrency
Utuado	Utuado barrio-pueblo	60.3 55.8	37.5 34.7	PR-111 west (Calle María M. Fernández Cruz) – Lares	Western terminus of PR-111 concurrency
Utuado	Río Abajo	59.9– 60.0	37.2– 37.3	PR-6613 – Río Abajo	
Arecibo	Río Arriba	68.8	42.8	PR-146 east – Ciales	
Arecibo	Río Arriba	70.5– 70.6	43.8– 43.9	PR-6621 – Río Arriba	
Arecibo	Río Arriba	70.6	43.9	PR-621 west to PR-10 – Arecibo, Utuado	
Arecibo	Hato Viejo	78.40	48.72	PR-10 north – Arecibo	Northern terminus of PR-123 and southern terminus of PR-6609; partial cloverleaf interchange; no entrance ramp to PR-10 southbound
Arecibo	Hato Viejo	78.40	48.72	PR-6609 (Carretera Jesús M. González García)	Continuation beyond PR-10
1.000 mi = 1.609 km; 1.000 km = 0.621 mi: Concurrency terminus; Incomplete access; Route transition

== See also ==
- List of highways in Ponce, Puerto Rico
- List of streets in Ponce, Puerto Rico
