= Río Abajo (disambiguation) =

Río Abajo is a subdistrict of Panama City, Panama.

Río Abajo may also refer to:

- Río Abajo, Ceiba, Puerto Rico, a barrio
- Río Abajo, Cidra, Puerto Rico, a barrio
- Río Abajo, Humacao, Puerto Rico, a barrio
- Río Abajo, Utuado, Puerto Rico, a barrio
- Río Abajo, Vega Baja, Puerto Rico, a barrio
- Río Abajo State Forest, a forest preserve in Puerto Rico
- Río Abajo F.C., a Panamanian football team
- Río abajo, a 1960 Argentine film directed by Enrique Dawi
