= Río Abajo State Forest =

State forest in Puerto Rico

Río Abajo State Forest Spanish: Bosque Estatal de Río Abajo
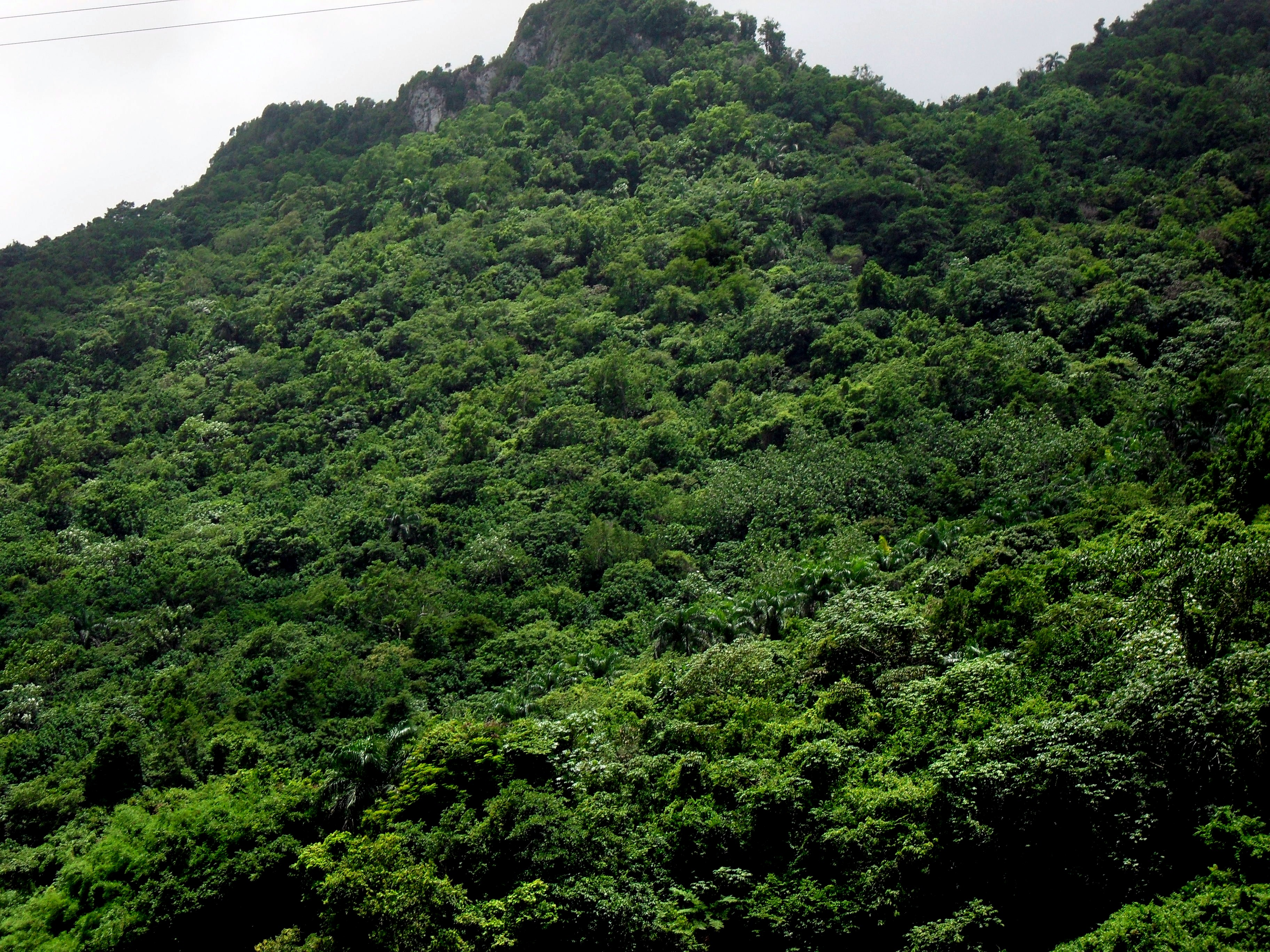
- View of Rio Abajo in Utuado
- Interactive map of Río Abajo State Forest

Geography
- Location: Arecibo, Utuado
- Coordinates: 18°20′23″N 66°41′59″W
- Elevation: 1,391 feet (424 m)
- Area: 3,486 cuerdas (3,386 acres)

Administration
- Status: Public, Commonwealth
- Authority: Puerto Rico Department of Natural and Environmental Resources (DRNA)
- Website: www.drna.gobierno.pr

Ecology
- WWF Classification: Puerto Rican moist forests

U.S. National Natural Landmark
- Designated: 1980

Rio Abajo State Forest is a forest preserve in Puerto Rico owned by the Department of Natural Resources and one of the 20 state forests in the island. It was designated a National Natural Landmark in 1980 and constitutes an area of 3,590 acres. It consists mostly of subtropical wet and moist karst forest. Mogotes and sinkholes fill the landscape. The forest preserve is located in the municipalities of Arecibo and Utuado. In addition to its ecological value the forest also contains a number of archaeological sites.

== History ==
Much of the development within the forest area was made by the Civilian Conservation Corps (CCC) during the 20th century. The forest preserve was one of the five designated forests designated in 1943 by the Puerto Rico Reconstruction Administration (Spanish: Administración de Reconstrucción de Puerto Rico) to preserve the remaining forested areas in the island. This forest also protects a large portion of the Arecibo River hydrological basin. The remains of the lumber roads cut by the loggers and CCC workers have now become trails. Due to its value as an ideal representation of the karstic ecosystems in Puerto Rico and the Caribbean, the state forest was designated a National Natural Landmark by the United States Department of Interior in 1980.

== Geography ==
Río Abajo State Forest is located on rugged karstic terrain in north-central Puerto Rico, between the municipalities of Arecibo (Hato Viejo and Río Arriba) and Utuado (Caguana and Río Abajo).

== Geology ==
The forest preserve is part of the Montebello karst, part of the Cibao formation in the Northern karst zone of Puerto Rico and its most prominent landforms are mogotes, distinctive steep eroded hills composed of limestone. Caves, canyons, mesas, sinkholes and ravines are also very common in this type of geology and can be encountered within the forest limits. This is the only place in Puerto Rico where the great Eocene-Oligocene unconformity can be clearly seen.

== Ecology and conservation ==
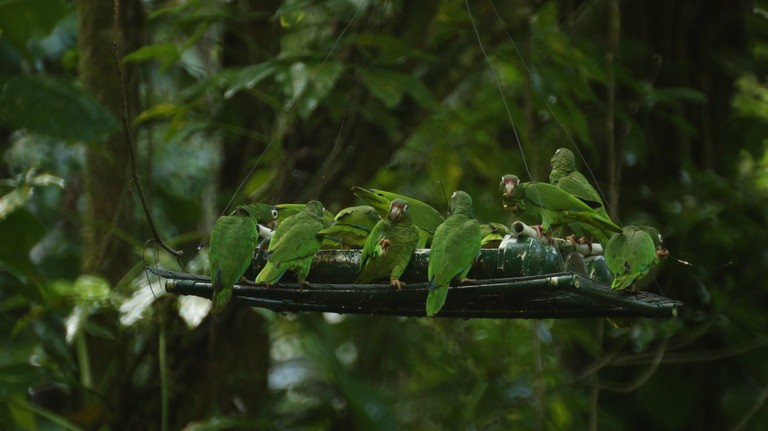
Puerto Rican parrots at the forest aviary. The forest is the site of a revitalized parrot population since 1983.

The forest is home to wildlife that include endangered species such as the Puerto Rican broad-winged hawk (Buteo platypterus brunnescens), the Puerto Rican boa (Chilabothrus inornatus), and a captive population of critically endangered Puerto Rican parrots (Amazona vittata). Captive parrots are slowly being released into Rio Abajo in an attempt to form a second population.

=== Flora ===
The forest is home to more than 175 species of trees, out of which about 47 species are considered endangered or threatened. Some of the most common plant species are the ceiba or kapok (Ceiba pentandra), algarrobo (Samanea saman), jobo (Spondias mombin), maga (Thespesia grandiflora), tabaiba (Sapium laurocerasus), cohoba (Cojoba arborea), and white fiddlewood (Vitex divaricata). The forest is also home to one of the four remaining populations of Daphnopsis hellerana, which only grows on limestone, erubia (Solanum drymophilum), palo de rosa (Ottoschulzia rhodoxylon), and the critically endangered nigua (Cornutia obovata).

=== Fauna ===
More than 34 species of birds have been documented in the forest. Some notable bird species found in the forest include Puerto Rican euphonias (Chlorophonia sclateri), Puerto Rican vireos (Vireo latimeri), Puerto Rican emeralds (Riccordia maugaeus), and the Puerto Rican spindalis (Spindalis portoricensis). It is also a key protected habitat to the endangered Puerto Rican broad-winged hawk (Buteo platypterus brunnescens) and a number of 60 individuals is estimated to live in the area. Puerto Rican parrot (Amazona vittata) populations have been re-introduced into the forest since 1983 as part of a conservation program by the Puerto Rico Department of Natural and Environmental Resources and the United States Fish and Wildlife Service. The forest is also home to the José Luis Vivaldi Lugo Aviary, dedicated to the breeding of the endangered Puerto Rican parrot for the purpose of developing a healthy population in the area; 43 individuals have been released into the wild as of 2007. As of 2025, Río Abajo is home to the largest wild population of Puerto Rican parrots, with 270 to 290 individuals.

== Recreation ==
The reserve has a reputation for being a great camping spot (reservations required) and it offers visitors as many as 70 different walking trails that will better enable visitors to observe as much of the plant and bird life in the area as possible. Some of the trails are the Frank H. Wadsworth trail, Visitors Center trail, the Cueva del Agua trail, and the Tanamá River trail. Given the karstic topography of the area, the state forest also has a number of caves such as Cueva del Agua and Cueva Alta.

The state forest is also close to other landmarks and attractions such as Cueva Ventana and Dos Bocas Lake.

== See also ==
- List of Puerto Rico state forests
- List of National Natural Landmarks in Puerto Rico
