= Hato Viejo =

Hato Viejo may refer to:

- Hato Viejo, Arecibo, Puerto Rico, a barrio
- Hato Viejo, Ciales, Puerto Rico, a barrio
- Hato Viejo, Dominican Republic, a municipal district in San Antonio de Guerra, Santo Domingo Province
