= Arenas, Utuado, Puerto Rico =

Barrio of Puerto Rico

Arenas
- Barrio
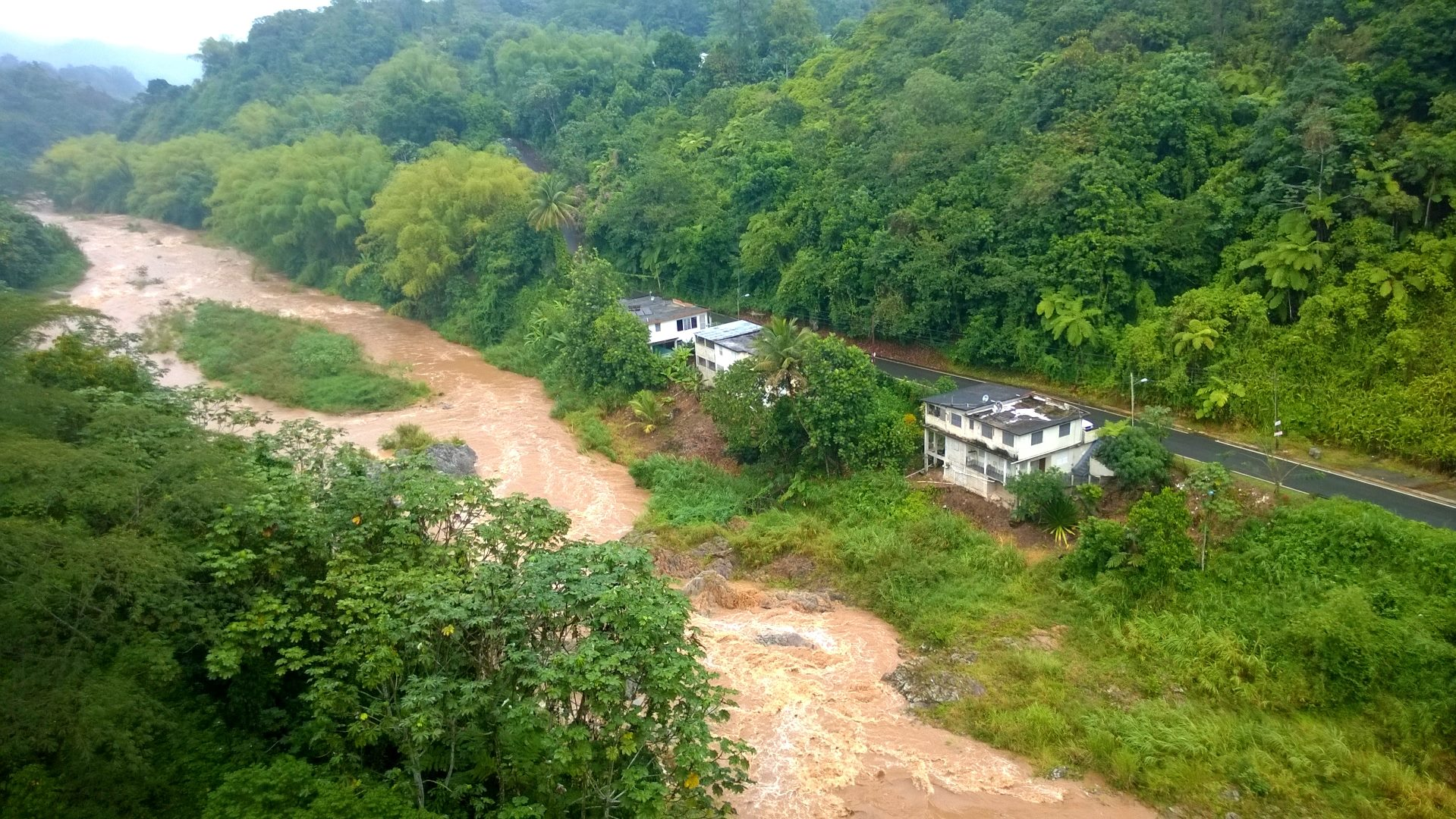
- Río Grande de Arecibo between Guaonico and Arenas

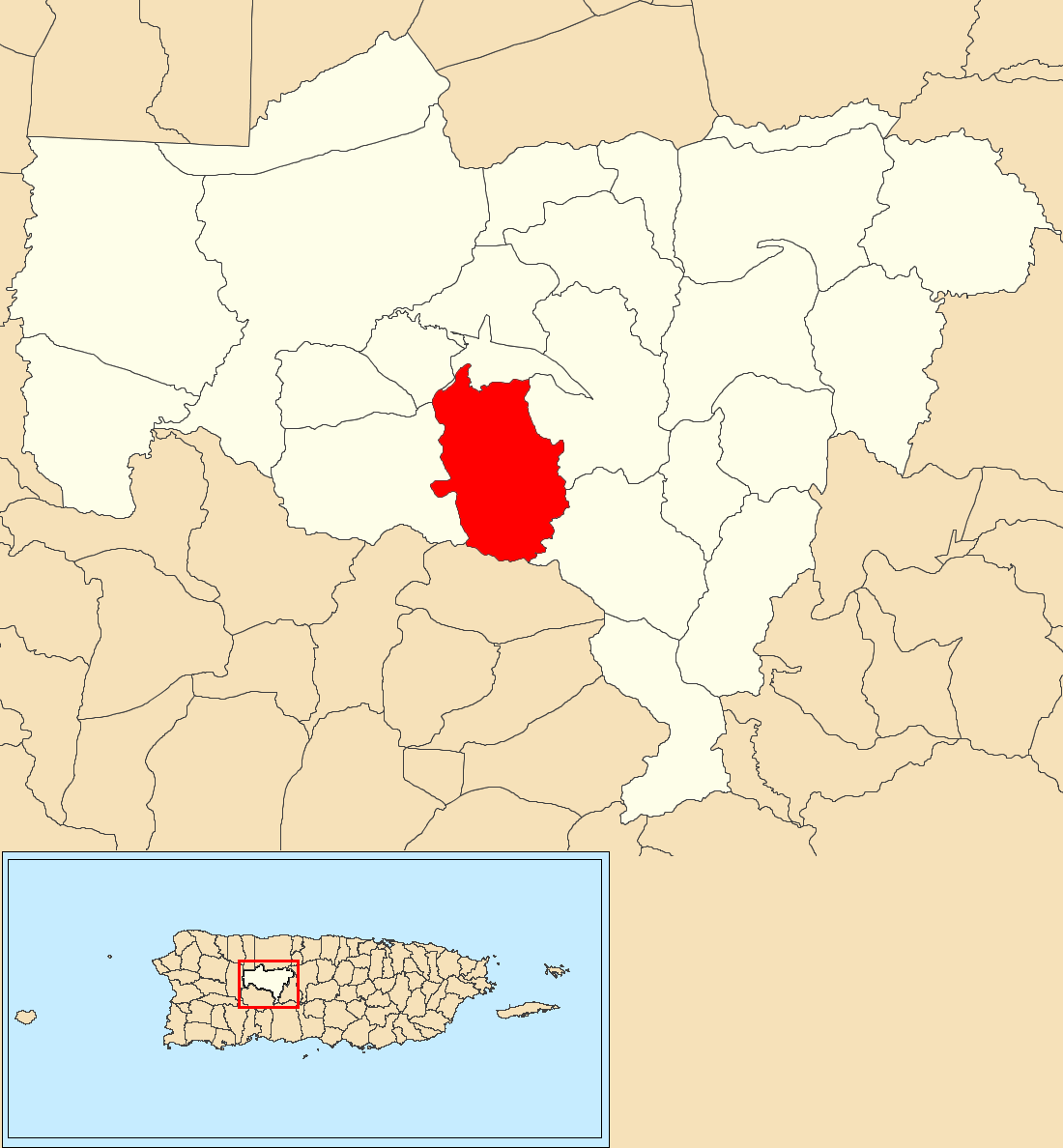
- Location of Arenas within the municipality of Utuado shown in red

- Location of Puerto Rico
- Coordinates: 18°14′24″N 66°42′27″W
- Commonwealth: Puerto Rico
- Municipality: Utuado

Area
  - Total: 5 sq mi (13 km^{2})
  - Land: 5 sq mi (13 km^{2})
  - Water: 0 sq mi (0 km^{2})
- Elevation: 755 ft (230 m)

Population (2010)
  - Total: 1,860
  - Density: 372/sq mi (144/km^{2})
- Source: 2010 Census
- Time zone: UTC−4 (AST)

Arenas is a barrio in the municipality of Utuado, Puerto Rico. Its population in 2010 was 1,860.

== History ==
Arenas was in Spain's gazetteers until Puerto Rico was ceded by Spain in the aftermath of the Spanish–American War under the terms of the Treaty of Paris of 1898 and became an unincorporated territory of the United States. In 1899, the United States Department of War conducted a census of Puerto Rico finding that the population of Arenas barrio was 1,577.

Historical population
Census	Pop.	Note	%±
1900	1,577		—
1910	1,537		−2.5%
1920	1,830		19.1%
1930	2,410		31.7%
1940	3,785		57.1%
1950	2,896		−23.5%
1960	2,374		−18.0%
1970	0		−100.0%
1980	1,921		—
1990	3,241		68.7%
2000	2,295		−29.2%
2010	1,860		−19.0%
U.S. Decennial Census; 1899 (shown as 1900) 1910-1930; 1930-1950 1980-2000 2010

Funding was available in February 2021 to reconstruct a bridge in Arenas barrio which was destroyed by Hurricane Maria in 2017.

== See also ==
- List of communities in Puerto Rico
