= Río Abajo, Utuado, Puerto Rico =

Barrio of Puerto Rico

Río Abajo
- Barrio
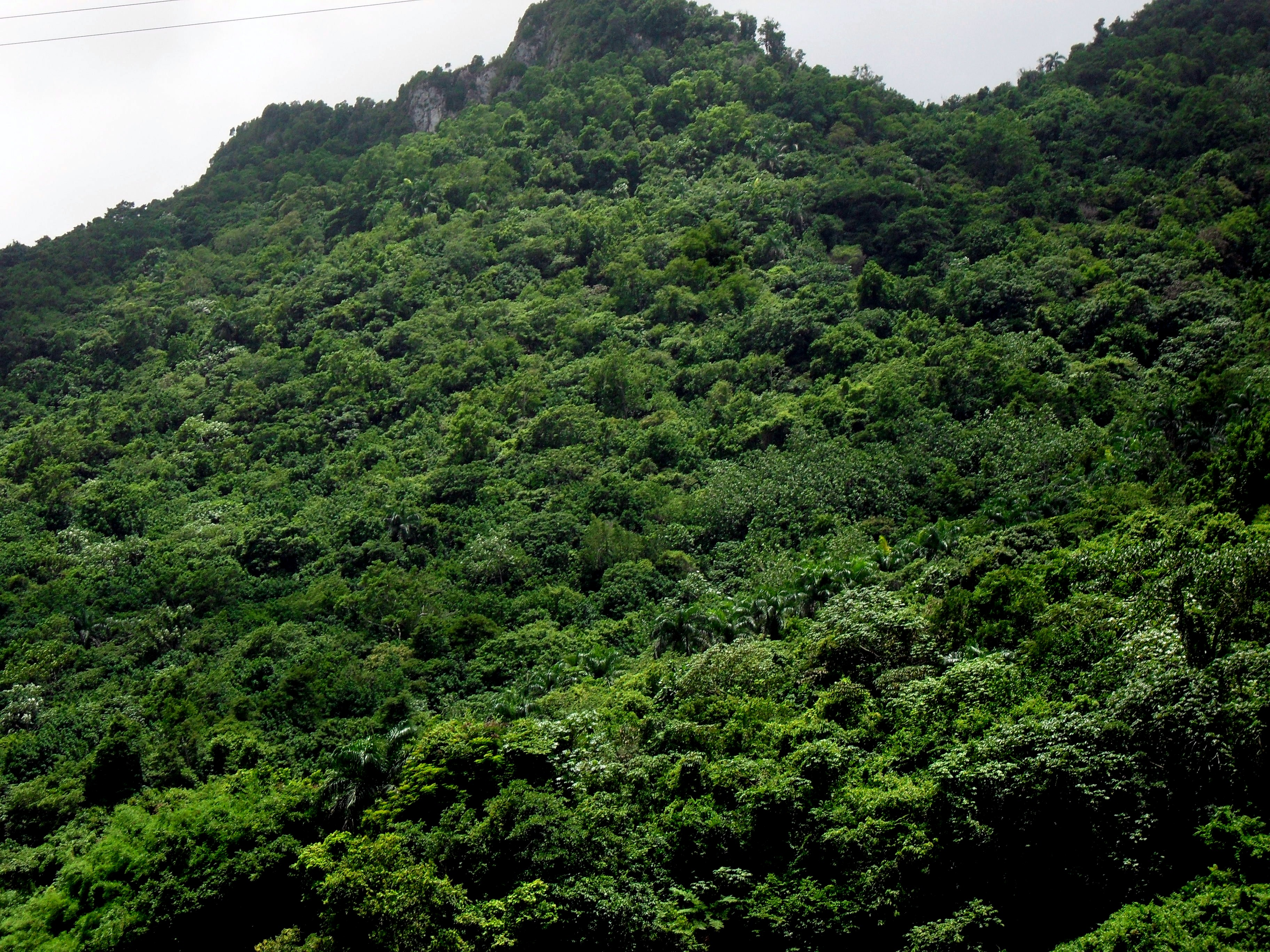
- View of Río Abajo from bordering Río Arriba in Arecibo

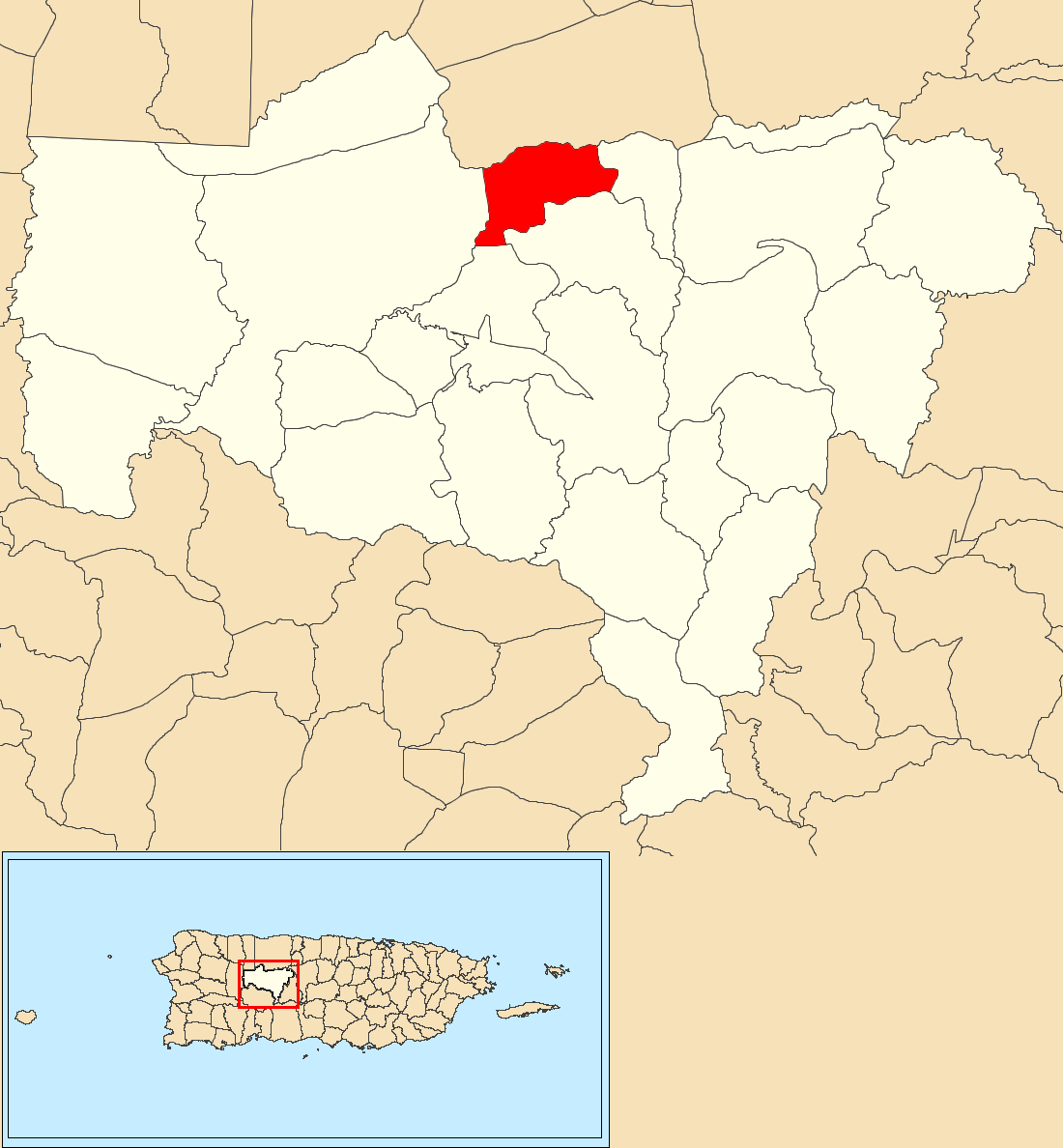
- Location of Río Abajo within the municipality of Utuado shown in red

- Location of Puerto Rico
- Coordinates: 18°18′59″N 66°41′36″W
- Commonwealth: Puerto Rico
- Municipality: Utuado

Area
  - Total: 2.31 sq mi (6.0 km^{2})
  - Land: 2.30 sq mi (6.0 km^{2})
  - Water: 0.01 sq mi (0.026 km^{2})
- Elevation: 1,070 ft (330 m)

Population (2010)
  - Total: 237
  - Density: 103/sq mi (40/km^{2})
- Source: 2010 Census
- Time zone: UTC−4 (AST)

Río Abajo is a barrio in the municipality of Utuado, Puerto Rico. Its population in 2010 was 237. It is an isolated, rural barrio in the Cordillera Central (Puerto Rico), the mountain range that goes east to west across the center of Puerto Rico.

== History ==
Río Abajo was in Spain's gazetteers until Puerto Rico was ceded by Spain in the aftermath of the Spanish–American War under the terms of the Treaty of Paris of 1898 and became an unincorporated territory of the United States. In 1899, the United States Department of War conducted a census of Puerto Rico finding that the population of Río Abajo barrio was 1,235.

Hurricane Maria which struck Puerto Rico on September 20, 2017, washed away the Río Abajo bridge and approximately 60 families were left isolated. Residents invented a zip line to bring food across until a temporary bridge was built. The construction of a permanent bridge was completed in March 2018.

Historical population
Census	Pop.	Note	%±
1900	1,235		—
1910	1,272		3.0%
1920	1,154		−9.3%
1930	1,294		12.1%
1940	1,776		37.2%
1950	1,227		−30.9%
1960	860		−29.9%
1970	757		−12.0%
1980	511		−32.5%
1990	404		−20.9%
2000	325		−19.6%
2010	237		−27.1%
U.S. Decennial Census; 1899 (shown as 1900) 1910-1930; 1930-1950 1980-2000 2010

== See also ==
- List of communities in Puerto Rico
