= Río Arriba, Arecibo, Puerto Rico =

Barrio of Puerto Rico

Río Arriba
- Barrio
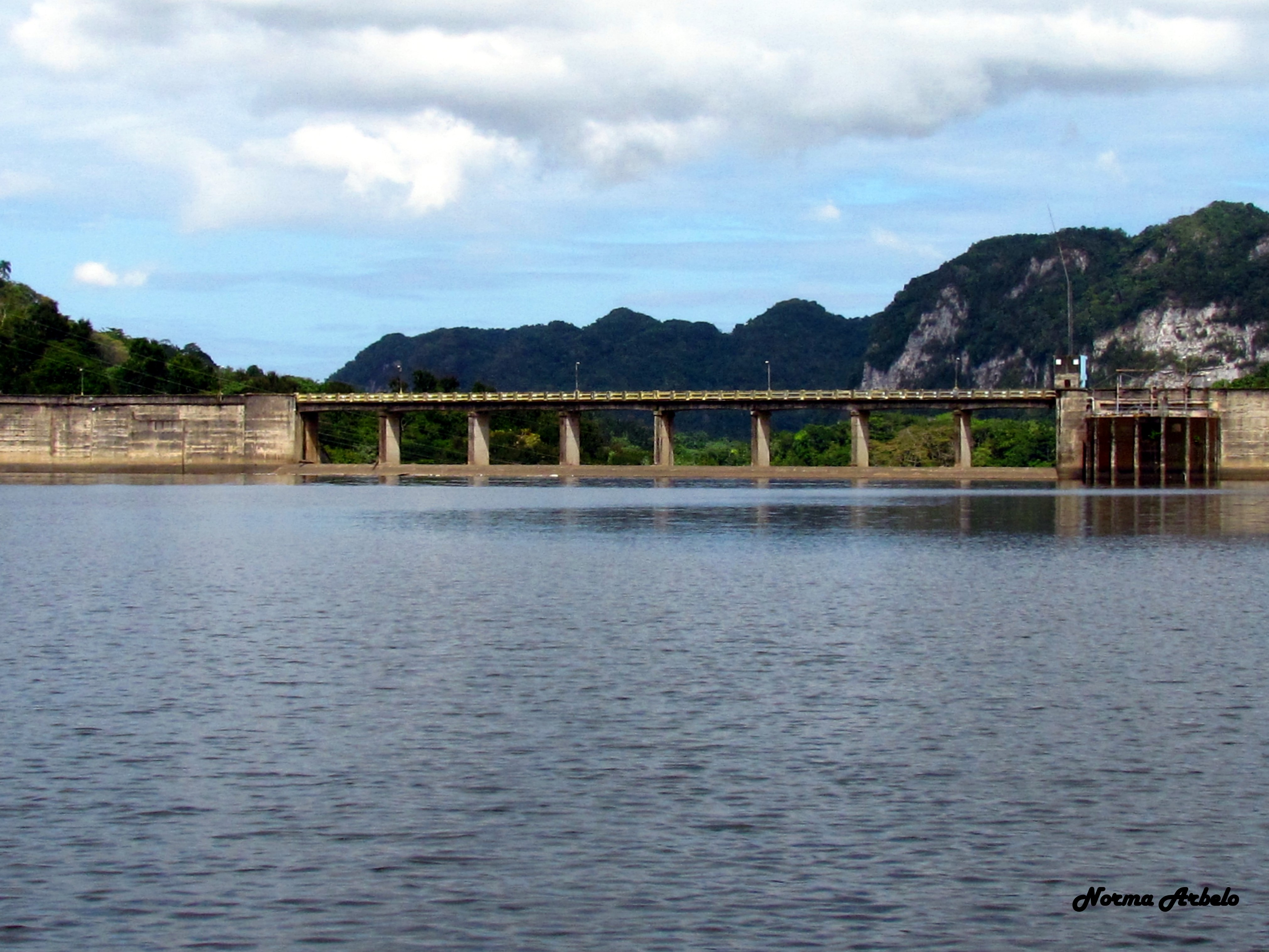
- Dos Bocas Dam as seen from Río Arriba

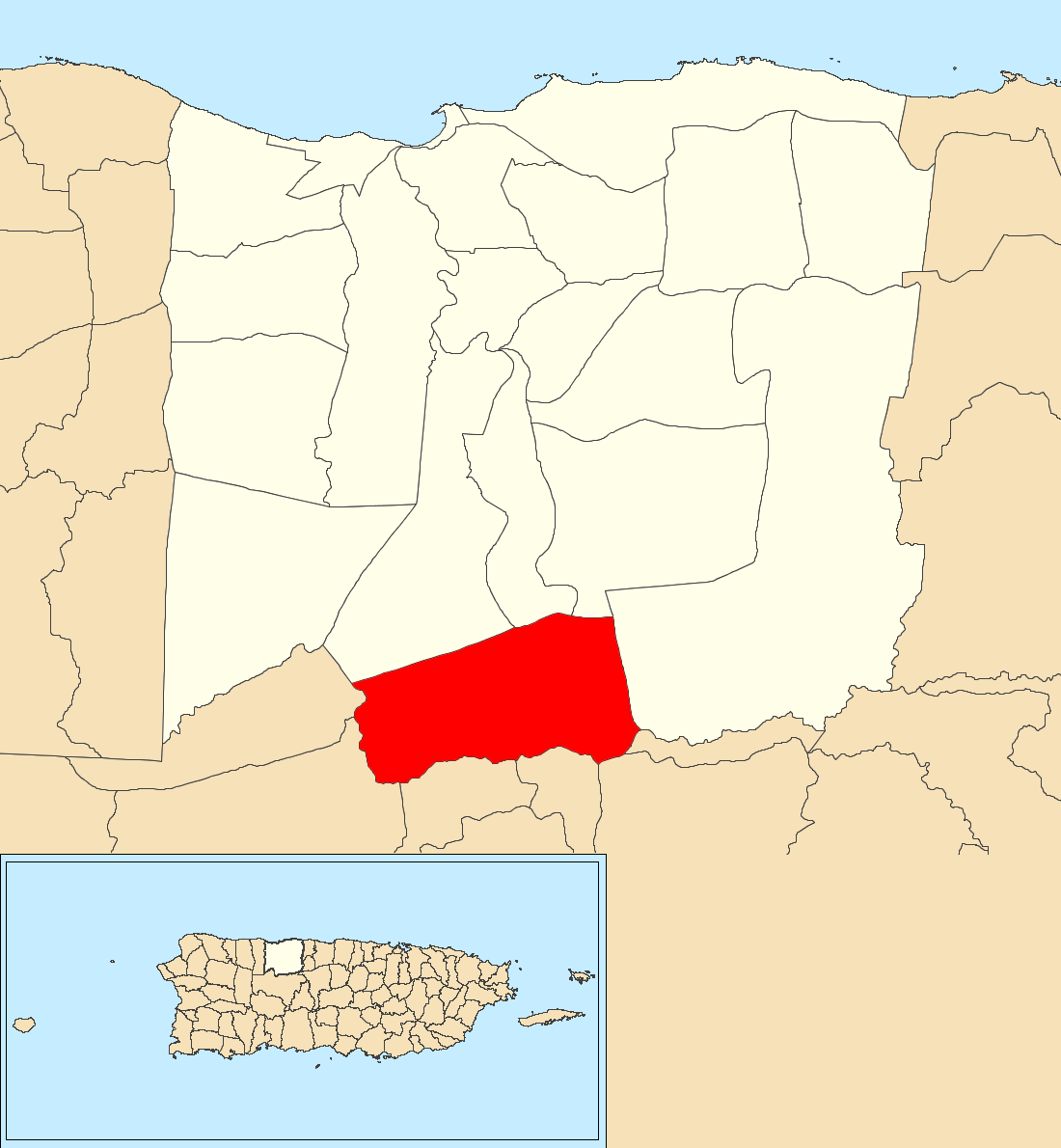
- Location of Río Arriba within the municipality of Arecibo shown in red

- Location of Puerto Rico
- Coordinates: 18°20′28″N 66°41′02″W
- Commonwealth: Puerto Rico
- Municipality: Arecibo

Area
  - Total: 8.84 sq mi (22.9 km^{2})
  - Land: 8.44 sq mi (21.9 km^{2})
  - Water: 0.40 sq mi (1.0 km^{2})
- Elevation: 1,119 ft (341 m)

Population (2010)
  - Total: 858
  - Density: 101.7/sq mi (39.3/km^{2})
- Source: 2010 Census
- Time zone: UTC−4 (AST)

Río Arriba is a barrio in the municipality of Arecibo, Puerto Rico. Its population in 2010 was 858.

== History ==
Río Arriba was in Spain's gazetteers until Puerto Rico was ceded by Spain in the aftermath of the Spanish–American War under the terms of the Treaty of Paris of 1898 and became an unincorporated territory of the United States. In 1899, the United States Department of War conducted a census of Puerto Rico finding that the population of Río Arriba barrio was 1,709.

Historical population
Census	Pop.	Note	%±
1900	1,709		—
1910	1,643		−3.9%
1920	2,090		27.2%
1930	2,620		25.4%
1940	3,144		20.0%
1950	2,017		−35.8%
1960	1,237		−38.7%
1970	1,066		−13.8%
1980	1,109		4.0%
1990	1,063		−4.1%
2000	1,028		−3.3%
2010	858		−16.5%
U.S. Decennial Census; 1899 (shown as 1900) 1910-1930; 1930-1950 1980-2000 2010

== Sectors ==
Barrios (which are, in contemporary times, roughly comparable to minor civil divisions) in turn are further subdivided into smaller local populated place areas/units called sectores (sectors in English). The types of sectores may vary, from normally sector to urbanización to reparto to barriada to residencial, among others.

The following sectors are in Río Arriba barrio:

Sector Central Hidroeléctrica, Sector Cuerpo de Paz, Sector Dos Bocas, Sector El Valle, Sector Jobo, Sector La Canina I y II, Sector Los Chorros, and Sector Vacupey.

== Hurricane Maria ==
On September 27, 2017 it was reported that a week after Hurricane Maria hit Puerto Rico, roads into and out of Río Arriba remained blocked and inaccessible. Residents were clearing the way with machetes and working with rescue crew to evacuate people who needed dialysis and emergency medical help.

== Climate ==
Climate data for Dos Bocas, Puerto Rico (200 feet (61 m)) (1991–2020 normals, extremes 1937–present)
Month	Jan	Feb	Mar	Apr	May	Jun	Jul	Aug	Sep	Oct	Nov	Dec	Year
Record high °F (°C)	96 (36)	94 (34)	96 (36)	98 (37)	98 (37)	99 (37)	98 (37)	100 (38)	100 (38)	98 (37)	97 (36)	96 (36)	100 (38)
Mean maximum °F (°C)	88.0 (31.1)	89.0 (31.7)	90.4 (32.4)	91.6 (33.1)	93.2 (34.0)	94.7 (34.8)	94.2 (34.6)	94.5 (34.7)	93.9 (34.4)	92.9 (33.8)	90.1 (32.3)	88.6 (31.4)	95.7 (35.4)
Mean daily maximum °F (°C)	84.9 (29.4)	85.6 (29.8)	86.3 (30.2)	87.5 (30.8)	88.6 (31.4)	90.8 (32.7)	90.9 (32.7)	90.7 (32.6)	90.6 (32.6)	89.9 (32.2)	87.3 (30.7)	85.5 (29.7)	88.2 (31.2)
Daily mean °F (°C)	74.7 (23.7)	74.7 (23.7)	75.3 (24.1)	77.0 (25.0)	78.7 (25.9)	80.4 (26.9)	80.8 (27.1)	81.0 (27.2)	80.5 (26.9)	79.9 (26.6)	78.0 (25.6)	75.9 (24.4)	78.1 (25.6)
Mean daily minimum °F (°C)	64.5 (18.1)	63.8 (17.7)	64.2 (17.9)	66.5 (19.2)	68.7 (20.4)	70.0 (21.1)	70.8 (21.6)	71.2 (21.8)	70.4 (21.3)	69.8 (21.0)	68.6 (20.3)	66.2 (19.0)	67.9 (19.9)
Mean minimum °F (°C)	60.3 (15.7)	60.0 (15.6)	60.4 (15.8)	62.5 (16.9)	64.6 (18.1)	67.1 (19.5)	67.8 (19.9)	68.4 (20.2)	67.7 (19.8)	67.0 (19.4)	65.0 (18.3)	62.1 (16.7)	58.1 (14.5)
Record low °F (°C)	50 (10)	51 (11)	51 (11)	52 (11)	52 (11)	59 (15)	58 (14)	60 (16)	59 (15)	58 (14)	58 (14)	50 (10)	50 (10)
Average precipitation inches (mm)	3.61 (92)	3.46 (88)	4.82 (122)	6.82 (173)	10.23 (260)	5.81 (148)	5.36 (136)	8.12 (206)	9.69 (246)	8.45 (215)	7.34 (186)	4.54 (115)	78.25 (1,988)
Average precipitation days (≥ 0.01 in)	14.1	11.6	12.8	14.2	17.4	13.1	15.3	17.3	17.7	16.9	17.0	14.5	181.9
Source: NOAA

== Gallery ==
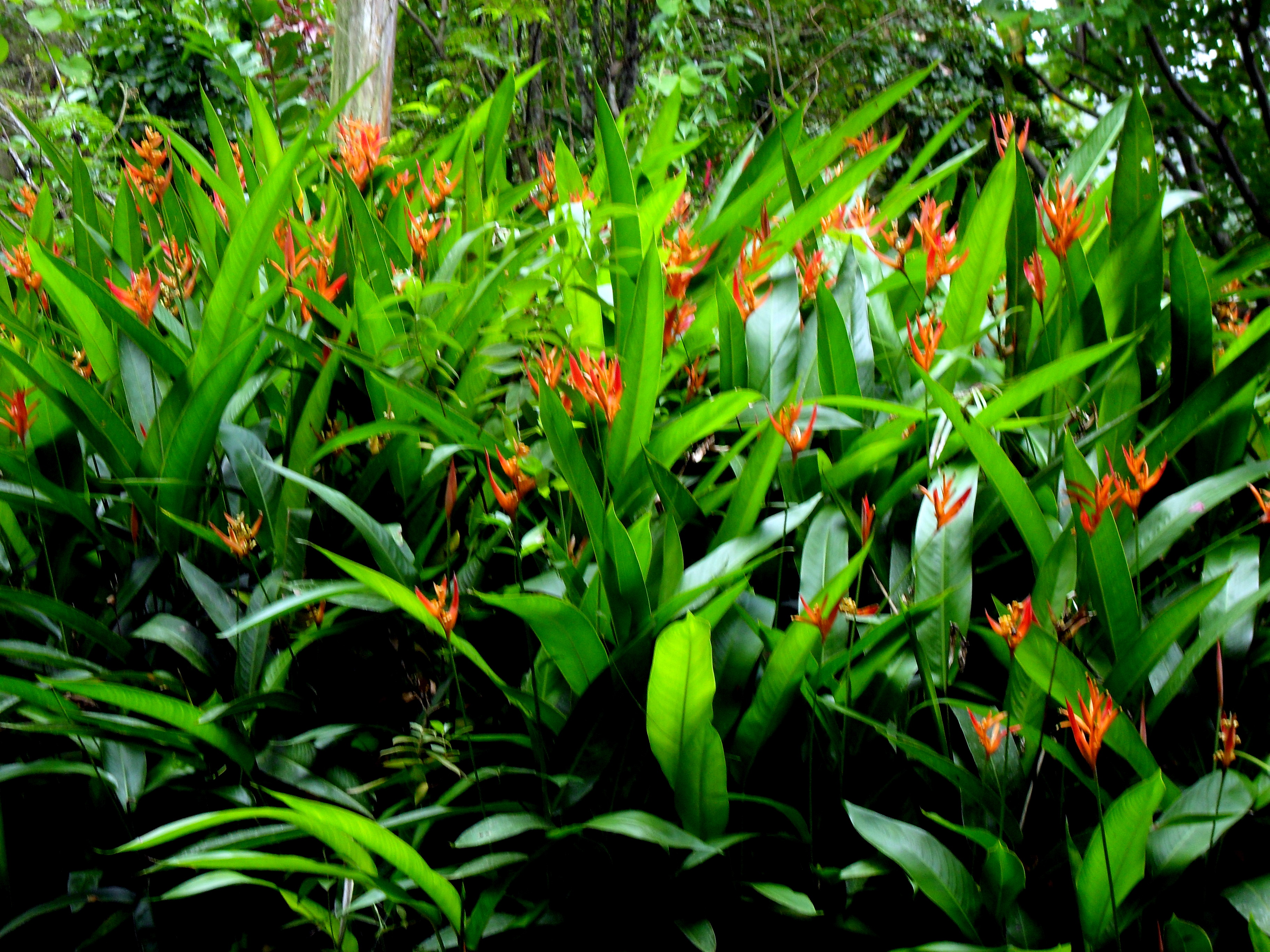
Flowers in Río Arriba

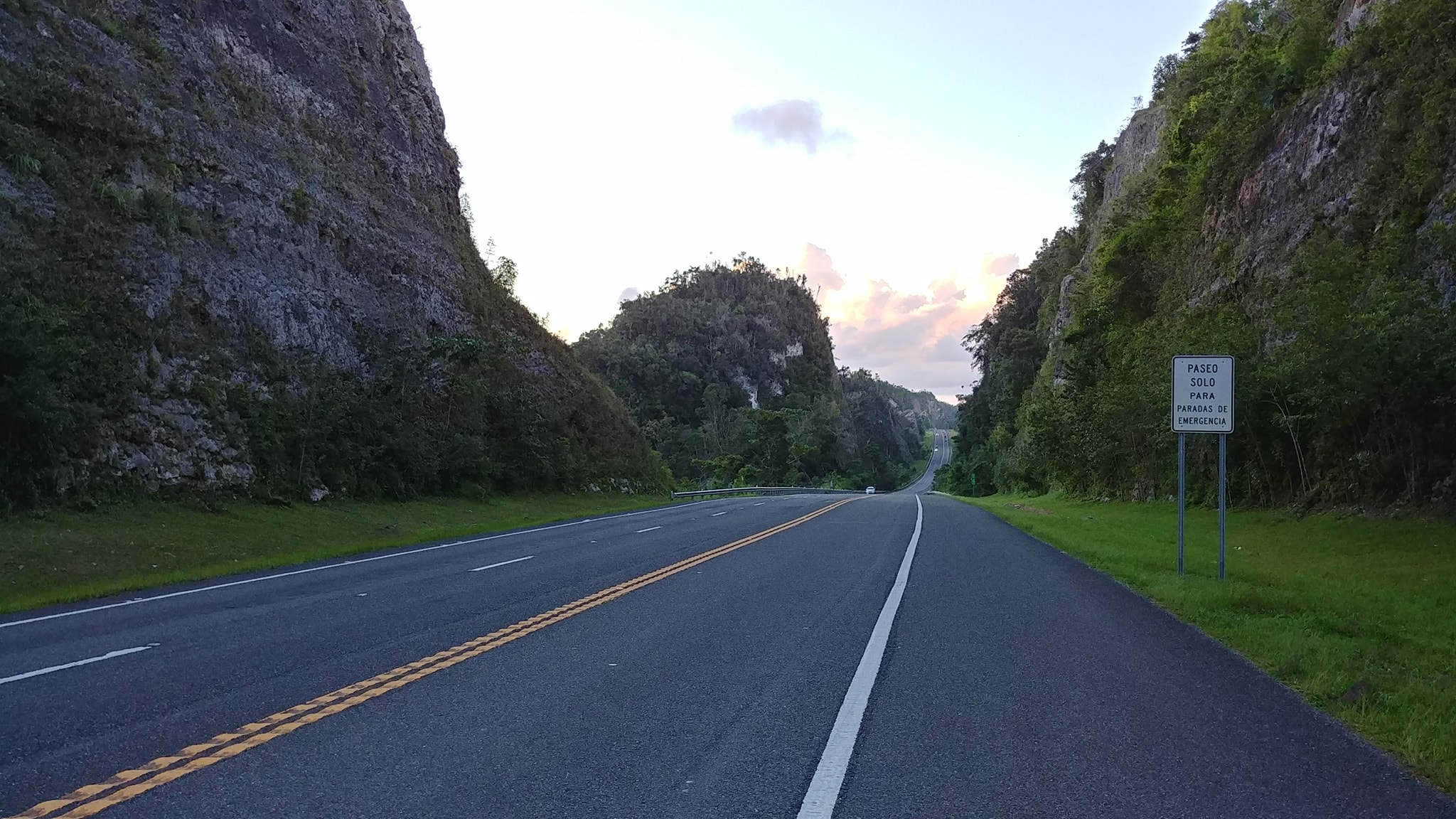
Puerto Rico Highway 10 in Río Arriba

== See also ==
- List of communities in Puerto Rico
- List of barrios and sectors of Arecibo, Puerto Rico
