= Bosque del Pueblo =

Forest in Puerto Rico

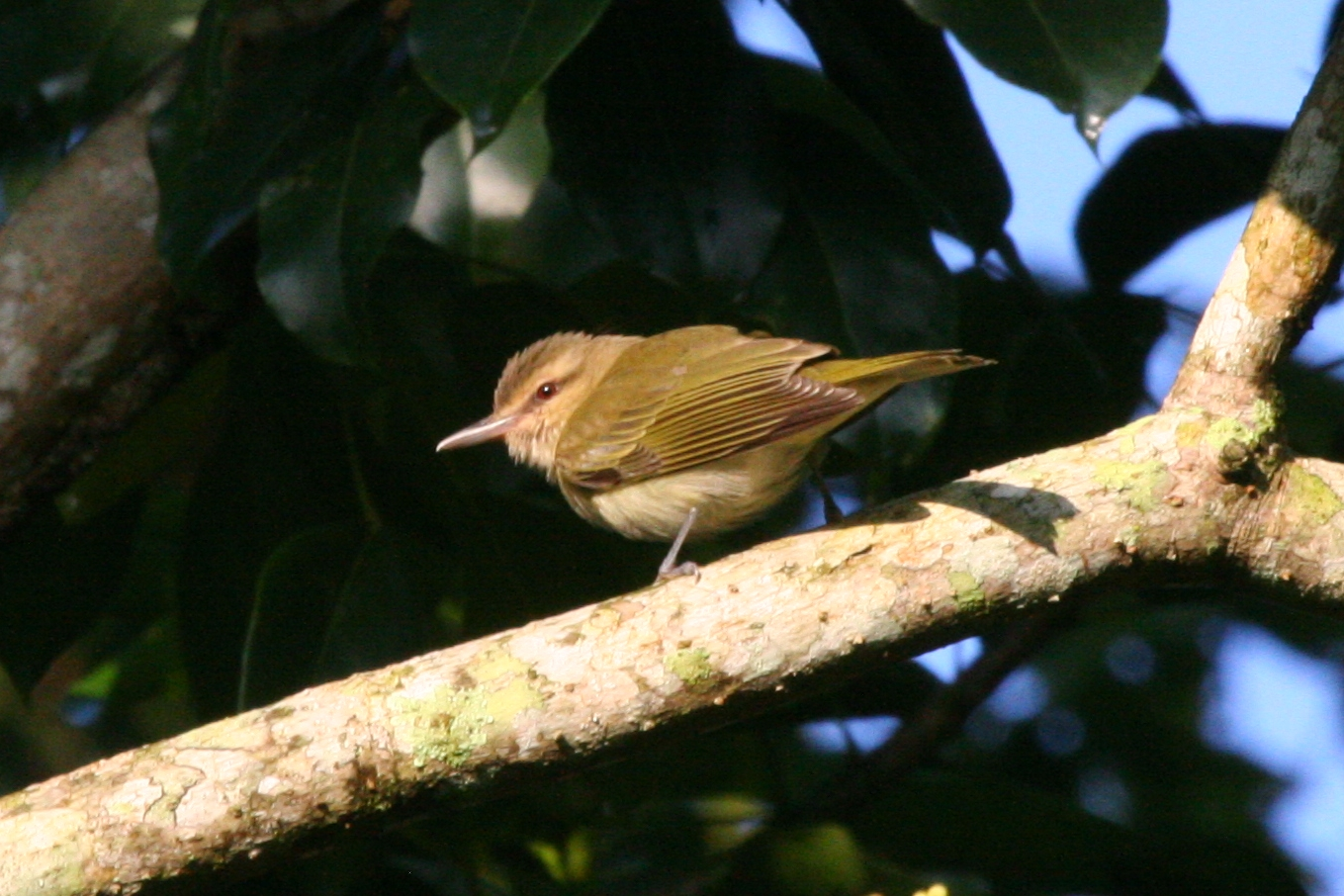
The Black-whiskered Vireo (Vireo altiloquus), locally known as the Julián chiví, is an important migratory species found in the forest.

Bosque del Pueblo (People's Forest) is one of the 20 forest units that make up the public forest system of Puerto Rico. The 738-acres forest is located in the municipality of Adjuntas and it comprises a preserved zone which was endangered of being developed as a quarry between the years 1980 and 1995. The forest is located in lands shared by the Adjuntas barrios or districts of Vegas Arriba, Vegas Abajo and Pellejas de Adjuntas. In addition to preserving the forest, the reserve is important to the preservation of the hydrological basins of the Pellejas and Viví Rivers, and many of the tributaries of the Arecibo River have their sources in the forest lands. The forest also functions as an ecological corridor between the Guilarte, Río Abajo and Toro Negro Forests.

== History ==
The area where the forest was established is rich in gold, silver and copper deposits and was intended to be developed as an open-air mine. Between the years 1980 and 1995 the cultural and environmentalist community group Taller de Arte y Cultura-Casa Pueblo lobbied against the construction of quarries in the area, and in 1995 the Puerto Rico government agreed to prevent mining from being developed in the forest lands. The forest was established and is managed by both the Puerto Rico Department of Natural and Environmental Resources, the Community Management Agreement Group and Casa Pueblo, now a non-profit environmental watchdog community-based organization in Adjuntas, Puerto Rico.

== Ecology ==
The forest reserve is an important breeding site for the migratory black-whiskered vireo (Vireo altiloquus). The forest is also home to several endangered species including the Puerto Rican broad-winged hawk (Buteo platypterus brunnescens), and the Puerto Rican sharp-shinned hawk (Accipiter striatus venator). Together with nearby Bosque La Olimpia and numerous other state forests and protected natural areas of the region, Bosque del Pueblo has been recognized as a component of the Cordillera Central Important Bird Area since 2007.

== Recreation ==
The forest reserve is open to the public and offers interpretative trails, a recreational and picnic area, a plant nursery, and a realistic replica of a native Taíno ceremonial court and batey. The non-profit organization Casa Pueblo also hosts a butterfly house, a store that sells traditional arts and crafts, a small antiquities museum, and a café. Casa Pueblo also offers educational tours, classes and talks on environmental issues, and cultural workshops. Camping is allowed in the forest under certain restrictions and reservations must be made beforehand.

== See also ==
- Casa Pueblo
- List of Puerto Rico state forests
