= Tanamá River =

River of Puerto Rico

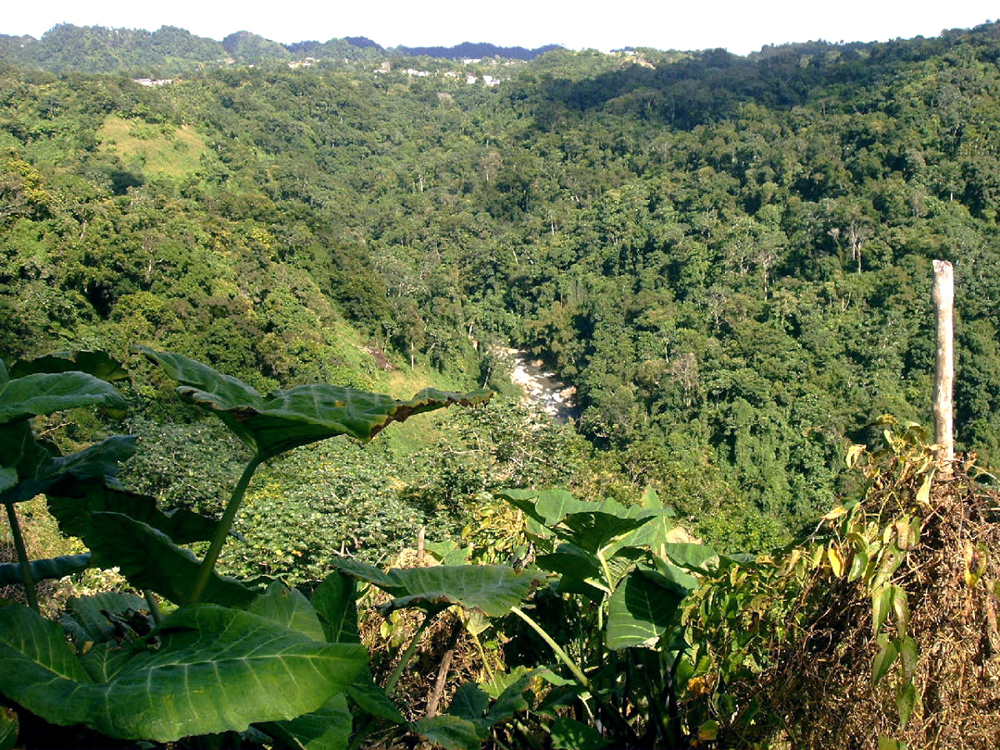
- Etymology: From the Taíno "tanama" possibly meaning 'butterfly'.
- Native name: Río Tanamá (Spanish)

Location
- Commonwealth: Puerto Rico
- Municipality: Arecibo, Utuado, Adjuntas

Physical characteristics
- Source
  - location: Portillo and Tanamá, Adjuntas
  - coordinates: 18.4268913°N 66.7035082°W
- Mouth
  - location: Arecibo River in Tanamá, Arecibo

The Tanamá River (Spanish: Río Tanamá) is a river of Arecibo, Utuado and Adjuntas, Puerto Rico.

== Gallery ==
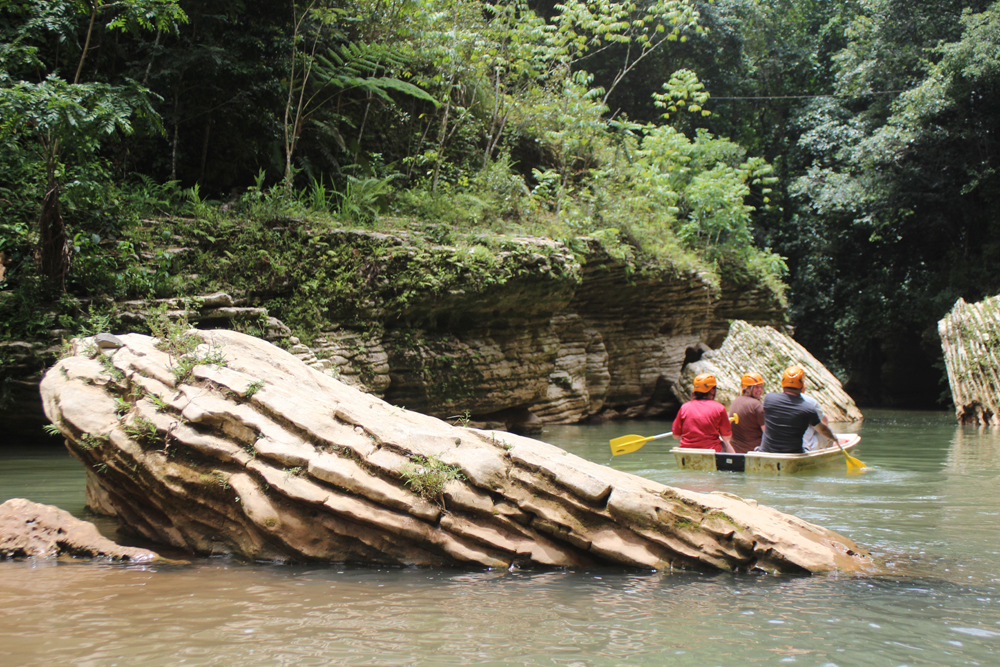
Tanamá River in Utuado

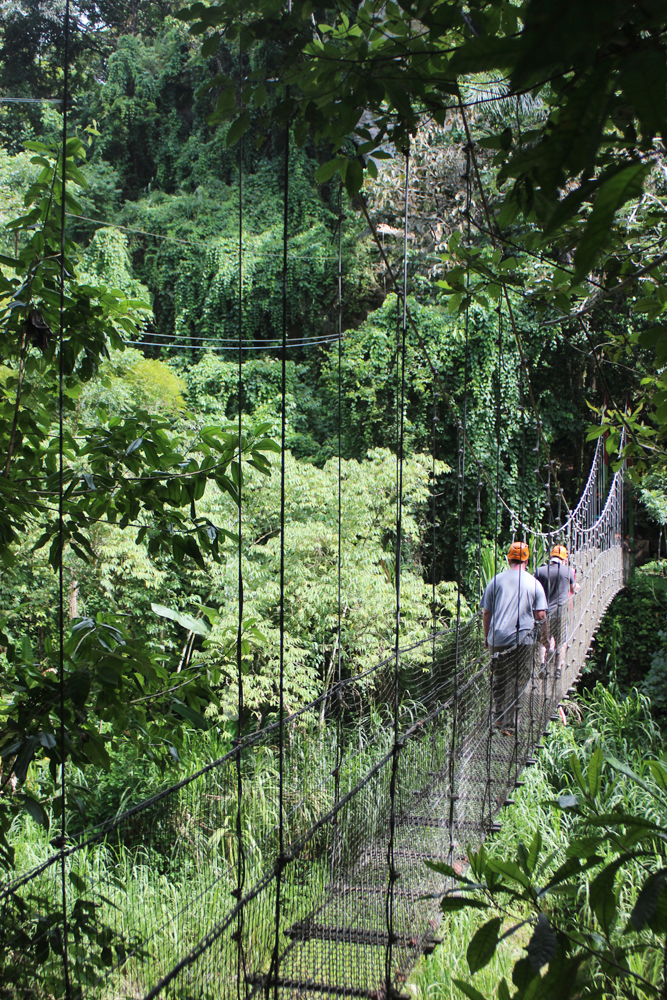
Simple suspension bridge over the Tanamá River

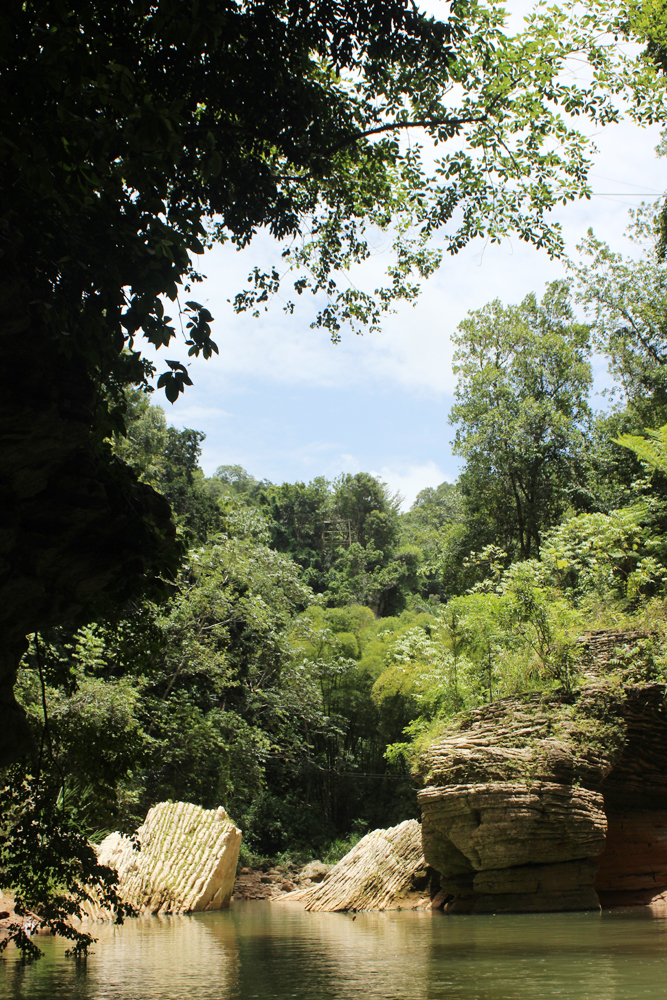
View of the river in Utuado

== See also ==
- List of rivers of Puerto Rico
