= Las Cabañas Bridge =

Historic bridge in Adjuntas, Puerto Rico

- U.S. National Register of Historic Places
- Puerto Rico Historic Sites and Zones
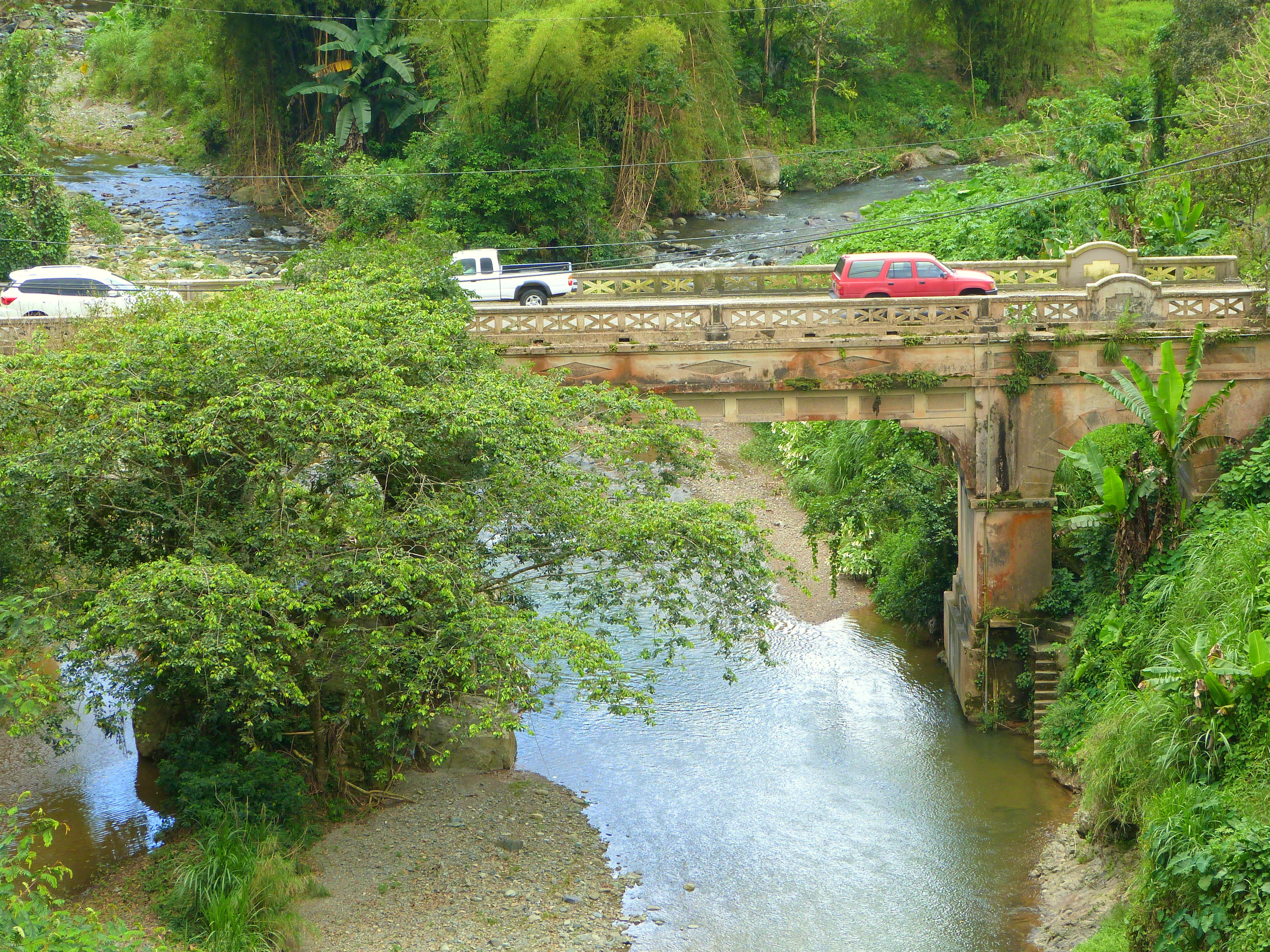
- The Las Cabañas Bridge in 2017

- Location within Puerto Rico Location within the Caribbean
- Location: Spanning the Río de las Vacas on Highway 135, km 82.4; Barrios Capáez and Juan González, (Note: Several prose sources place the bridge in Barrios Capáez and Garzas, while other, map-based sources show it to be in Barrios Capáez and Juan González.); Adjuntas municipality Puerto Rico
- Coordinates: 18°10′47″N 66°44′11″W
- Area: 235.2 m^{2} (2,532 sq ft)
- Built: 1919
- Built by: Félix Benítez Rexach
- Engineer: Rafael Nones
- MPS: Historic Bridges of Puerto Rico MPS
- NRHP reference No.: 95000838
- RNSZH No.: 2000-(RC)-22-JP-SH

Significant dates
- Added to NRHP: July 19, 1995
- Designated RNSZH: March 15, 2001

The Las Cabañas Bridge (Spanish: Puente de Las Cabañas) is a historic highway bridge spanning across the Pellejas River in Adjuntas municipality, Puerto Rico. Built in 1919 to provide access to a key coffee-producing region, it was financed by nearby plantations through public subscription. Designer Rafael Nones and builder Félix Benítez Rexach, two of the most prominent figures in Puerto Rican bridge construction in the early 20th century, used a unique combination of steel and concrete technologies to produce a girder design unlike any other on the island and possibly beyond.

The bridge was added to the U.S. National Register of Historic Places in 1995, and to the Puerto Rico Register of Historic Sites and Zones in 2001.

== See also ==
- National Register of Historic Places listings in Adjuntas, Puerto Rico
