= Mr. & Mrs. Clark Foreman Mountain Retreat =

Historic house in Adjuntas, Puerto Rico

- U.S. National Register of Historic Places
- Location within Puerto Rico
- Location: Adjuntas, Puerto Rico
- Coordinates: 18°08′15″N 66°41′39″W
- Built: 1970
- Architect: Henry Klumb
- Architectural style: Modernism
- NRHP reference No.: 100007218
- Added to NRHP: December 6, 2021

The Foreman House (Spanish: Casa Foreman), officially listed in the National Register of Historic Places as the Mr. & Mrs. Clark Foreman Mountain Retreat, is a notable Modernist residence designed by German architect Henry Klumb. A student of Frank Lloyd Wright, Klumb notably applied the philosophy of organic architecture in the design of the residence, by smoothly blending in the Usonian construction with the mountainous relief and tropical vegetation while taking advantage of the natural sunlight. The residence's non-rectangular angles are also inspired by the Hanna–Honeycomb House in Stanford, California. The house is located in the Portugués barrio of Adjuntas, Puerto Rico.
