= Tanamá =

Tanamá may refer to:

== Places ==
- Tanamá, Adjuntas, Puerto Rico, a barrio
- Tanamá, Arecibo, Puerto Rico, a barrio
