= Pellejas =

Pellejas may refer to:

== Places ==
- Pellejas, Adjuntas, Puerto Rico, a barrio
- Pellejas, Orocovis, Puerto Rico, a barrio
