= Flag of Adjuntas =

The flag of Adjuntas.

The flag that serves as the symbol of the municipality of Adjuntas, Puerto Rico is divided diagonally into two triangle fields, purple and green, that separated by thin white stripe. In each fields is placed a white cross fleury.

== Design ==
The flag is divided diagonally into two triangle fields separated by thin white stripe. The fields are purple and green. In each fields is placed a white cross fleury. The colours were adopted from the coat of arms of Adjuntas. White colour symbolize the purity, green, the flora of the region, and purple references the colour of the cloths of Joachim, who was, in Christian tradition, the father of Mary, mother of Jesus. Two crosses symbolize Joachim, and Saint Anne, in who were, in Christian tradition, parents of Mary. The crosses also refer to the fact that the town name Adjuntas translates in Spanish to adjusted [to], and refers to the towns close location to nearby Coamo, which had such crosses in its coat of arms. Additionally, the crosses were inspired by the ones present in the coat of arms of Illescas, a town in Castilla–La Mancha, Spain.
