= Juan González, Adjuntas, Puerto Rico =

Barrio in Puerto Rico

Juan González
- Barrio
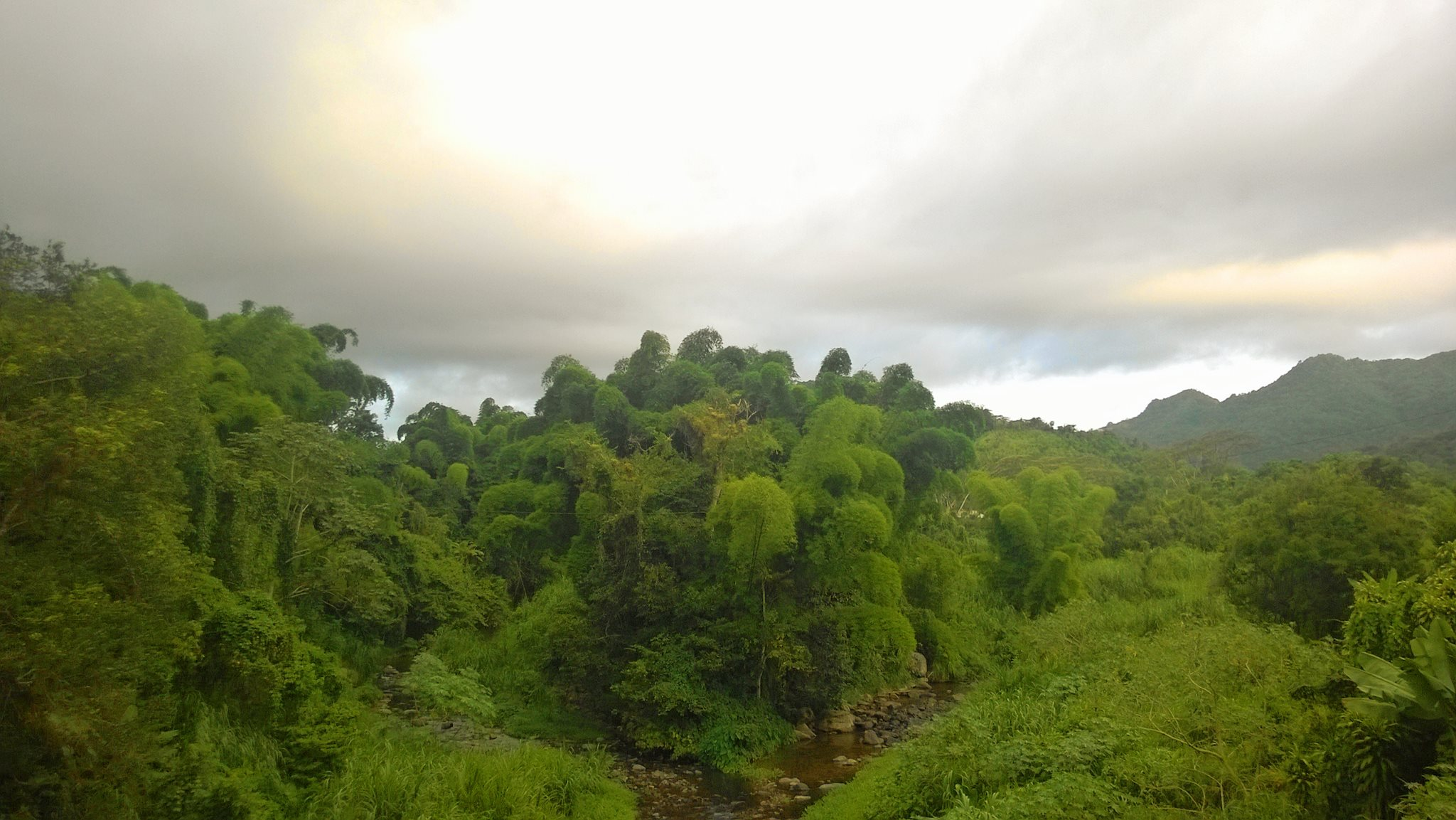
- Cidra and Vacas Rivers between Juan González, Garzas and Capáez

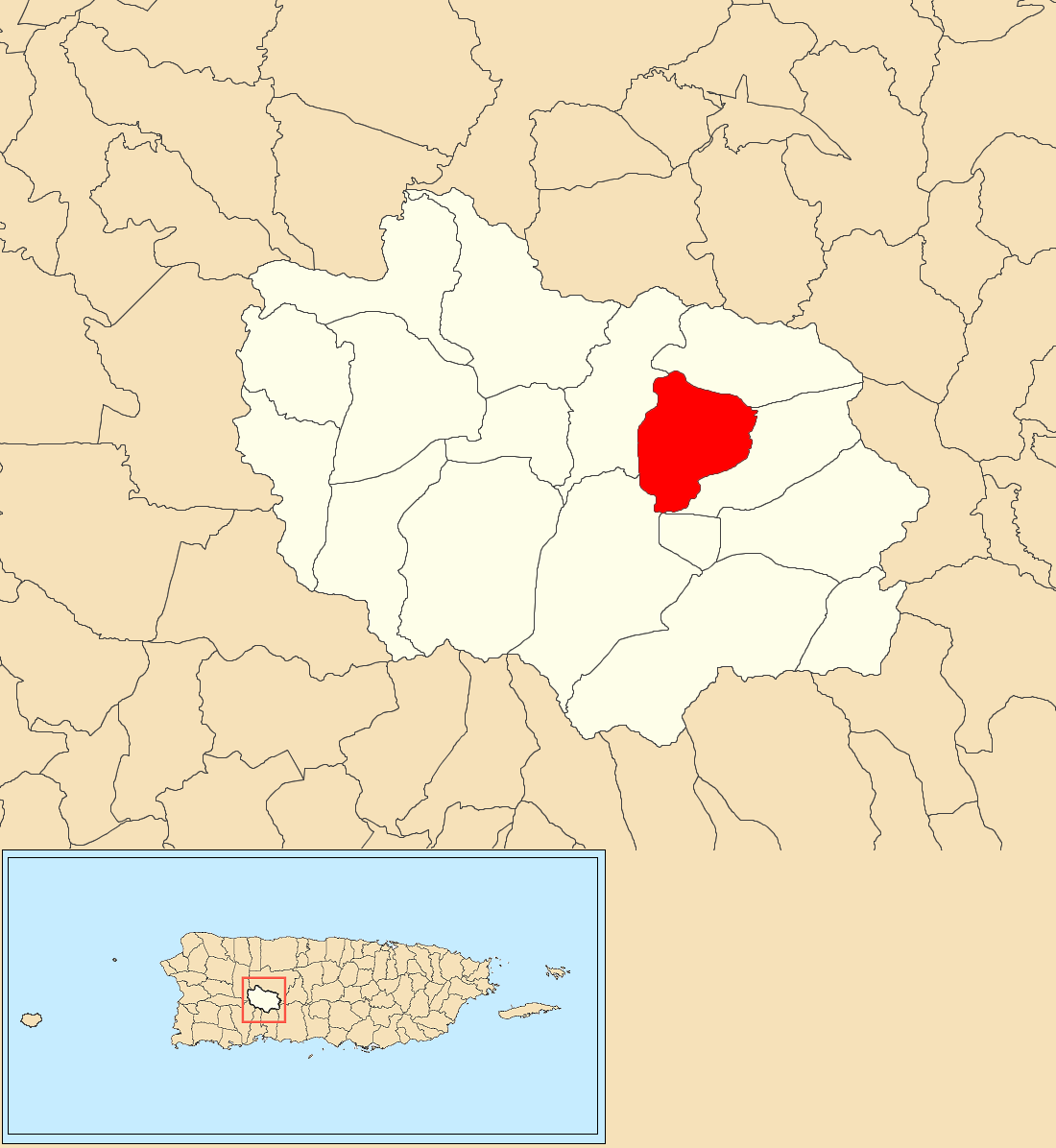
- Location of Juan González barrio within the municipality of Adjuntas shown in red

- Location of Puerto Rico
- Coordinates: 18°11′27″N 66°43′25″W
- Commonwealth: Puerto Rico
- Municipality: Adjuntas

Area
  - Total: 3.01 sq mi (7.8 km^{2})
  - Land: 2.99 sq mi (7.7 km^{2})
  - Water: 0.02 sq mi (0.052 km^{2})
- Elevation: 2,241 ft (683 m)

Population (2010)
  - Total: 865
  - Density: 289.3/sq mi (111.7/km^{2})
- Source: 2010 Census
- Time zone: UTC−4 (AST)
- Website: adjuntaspr.com

Juan González is a rural barrio in the municipality of Adjuntas, Puerto Rico.

== History ==
Juan González was in Spain's gazetteers until Puerto Rico was ceded by Spain in the aftermath of the Spanish–American War under the terms of the Treaty of Paris of 1898 and became an unincorporated territory of the United States. In 1899, the United States Department of War conducted a census of Puerto Rico finding that the combined population of Portugués barrio and Juan González barrio was 1,235.

Historical population
Census	Pop.	Note	%±
1910	803		—
1920	1,072		33.5%
1930	1,390		29.7%
1940	1,199		−13.7%
1950	983		−18.0%
1960	787		−19.9%
1970	575		−26.9%
1980	682		18.6%
1990	940		37.8%
2000	736		−21.7%
2010	865		17.5%
U.S. Decennial Census; 1900 (N/A) 1910-1930; 1930-1950 1960 1980-2000 2010

== See also ==
- List of communities in Puerto Rico
