= Portugués, Adjuntas, Puerto Rico =

Barrio in Puerto Rico

Portugués
- Barrio
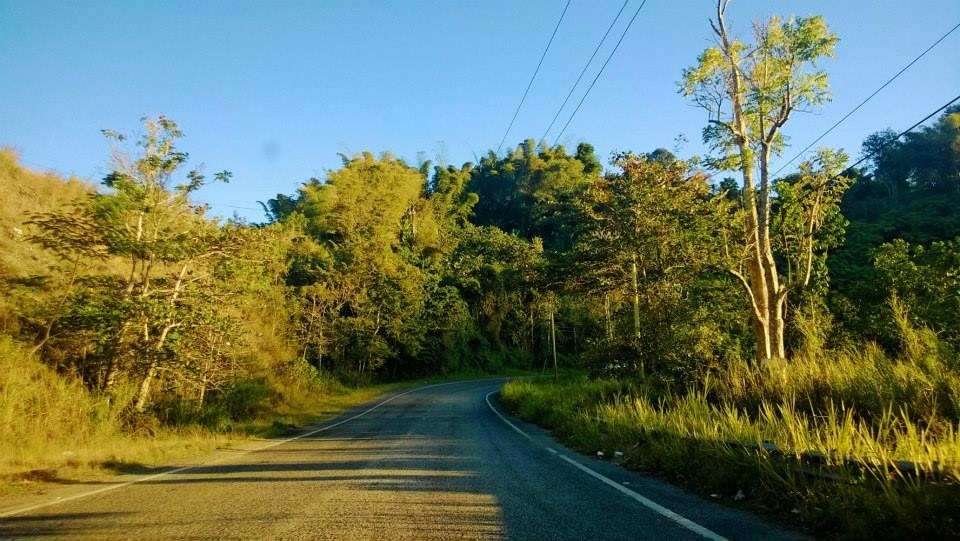
- Puerto Rico Highway 143 between Saltillo and Portugués

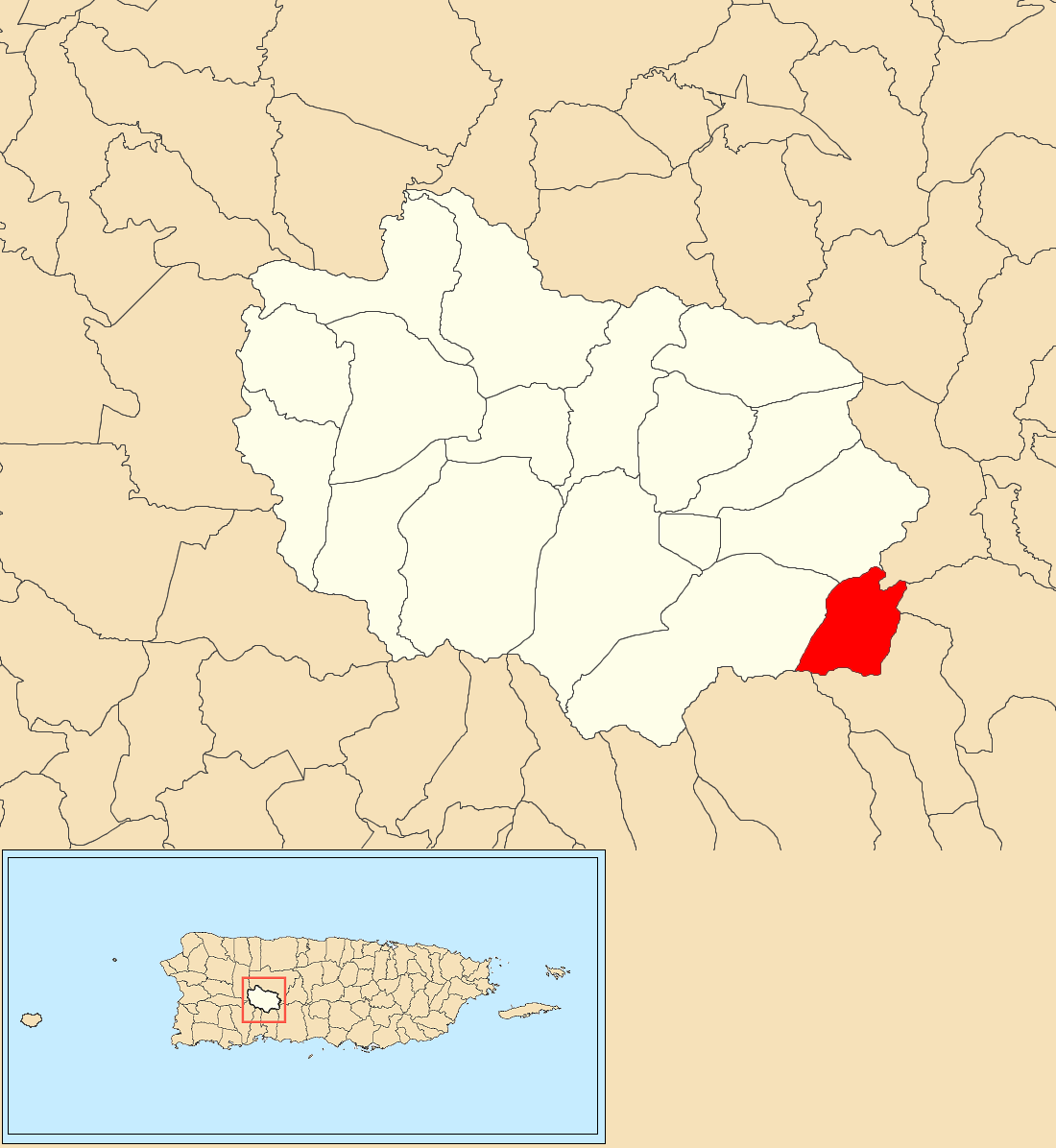
- Location of Portugués barrio within the municipality of Adjuntas shown in red

- Location within the Caribbean
- Coordinates: 18°08′30″N 66°40′59″W
- Commonwealth: Puerto Rico
- Municipality: Adjuntas

Area
  - Total: 2 sq mi (5.2 km^{2})
  - Land: 2 sq mi (5.2 km^{2})
  - Water: 0 sq mi (0 km^{2})
- Elevation: 2,215 ft (675 m)

Population (2010)
  - Total: 476
  - Density: 238/sq mi (92/km^{2})
- Source: 2010 Census
- Time zone: UTC−4 (AST)
- Website: adjuntaspr.com

Portugués is a rural barrio in the municipality of Adjuntas, Puerto Rico. Its population in 2010 was 476.

== History ==
Portugués was in Spain's gazetteers until Puerto Rico was ceded by Spain in the aftermath of the Spanish–American War under the terms of the Treaty of Paris of 1898 and became an unincorporated territory of the United States. In 1899, the United States Department of War conducted a census of Puerto Rico finding that the combined population of Portugués barrio and Juan González barrio was 1,235.

Historical population
Census	Pop.	Note	%±
1910	510		—
1920	633		24.1%
1930	449		−29.1%
1940	507		12.9%
1950	404		−20.3%
1960	390		−3.5%
1970	414		6.2%
1980	297		−28.3%
1990	353		18.9%
2000	494		39.9%
2010	476		−3.6%
U.S. Decennial Census; 1900 (N/A) 1910-1930; 1930-1950 1960 1980-2000 2010

== See also ==
- List of communities in Puerto Rico
