= Portillo, Adjuntas, Puerto Rico =

Barrio in Puerto Rico

Portillo
- Barrio
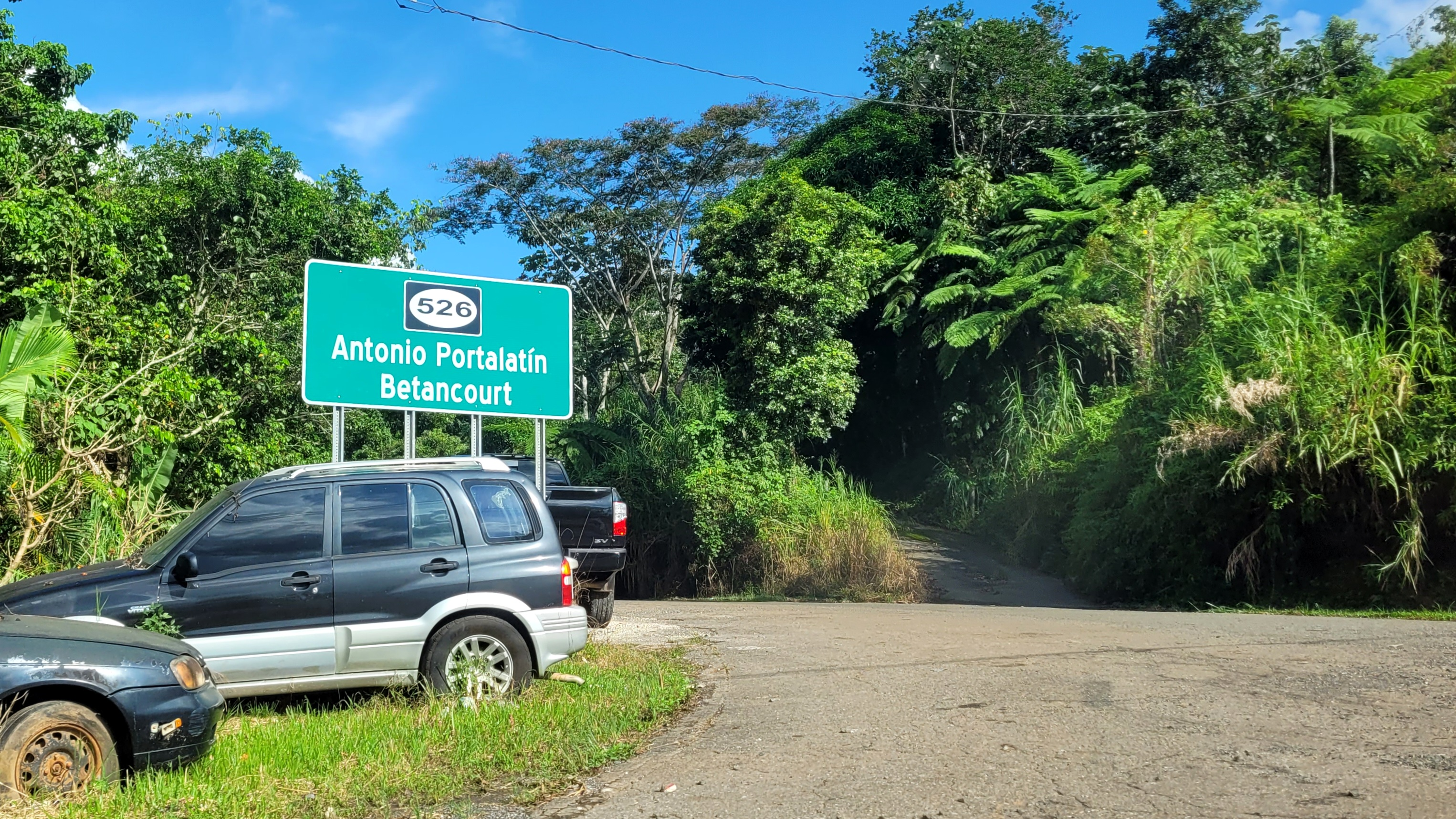
- Puerto Rico Highway 526 in Portillo

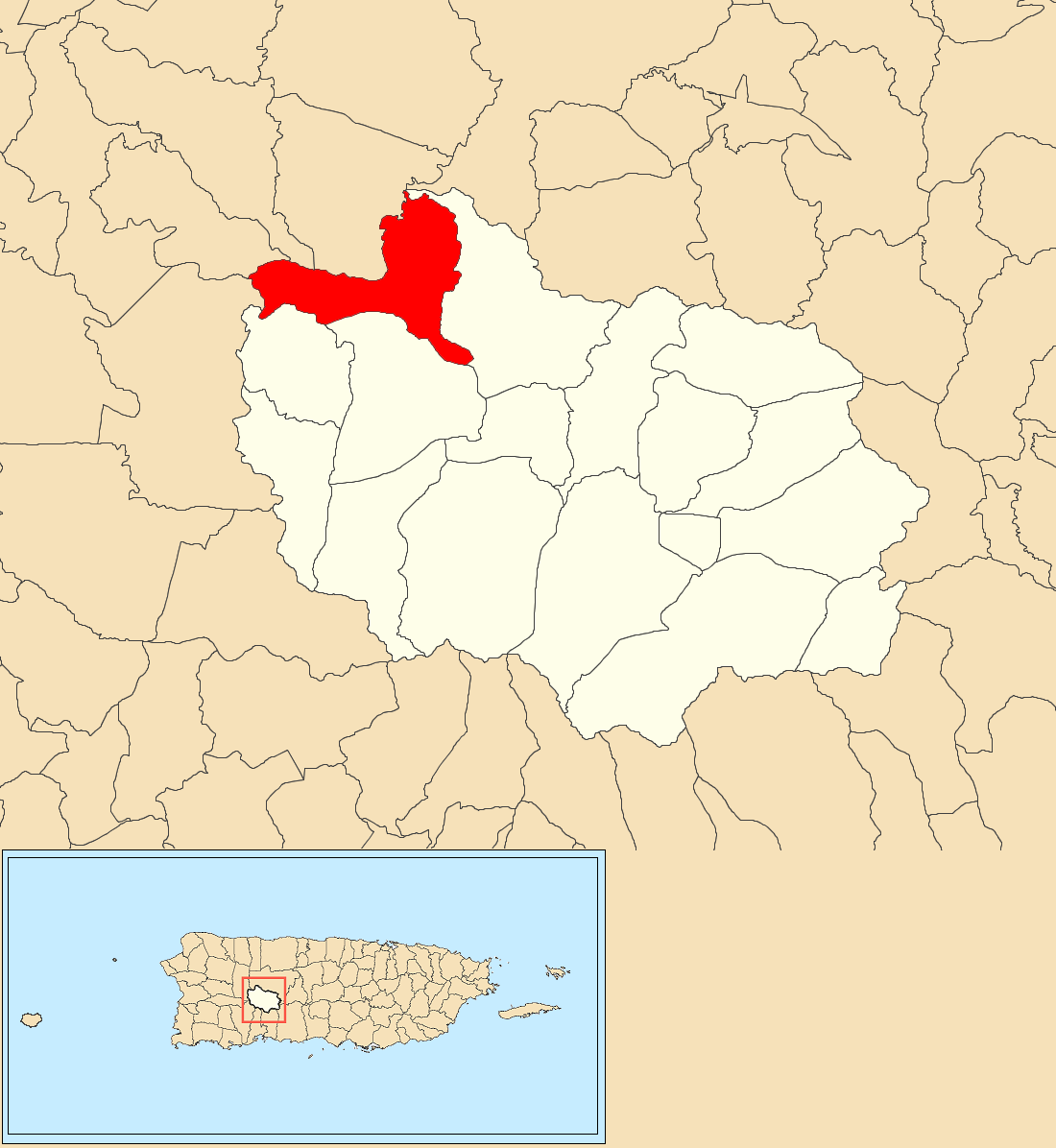
- Location of Portillo barrio within the municipality of Adjuntas shown in red

- Location of Puerto Rico
- Coordinates: 18°13′41″N 66°48′00″W
- Commonwealth: Puerto Rico
- Municipality: Adjuntas

Area
  - Total: 4.04 sq mi (10.5 km^{2})
  - Land: 4.04 sq mi (10.5 km^{2})
  - Water: 0 sq mi (0 km^{2})
- Elevation: 1,811 ft (552 m)

Population (2010)
  - Total: 606
  - Density: 150/sq mi (58/km^{2})
- Source: 2010 Census
- Time zone: UTC−4 (AST)
- Website: adjuntaspr.com

Portillo is a rural barrio in the municipality of Adjuntas, Puerto Rico. Its population in 2010 was 606.

== History ==
Portillo was in Spain's gazetteers until Puerto Rico was ceded by Spain in the aftermath of the Spanish–American War under the terms of the Treaty of Paris of 1898 and became an unincorporated territory of the United States. In 1899, the United States Department of War conducted a census of Puerto Rico finding that the population of Portillo barrio was 1,271.

Historical population
Census	Pop.	Note	%±
1900	1,271		—
1910	1,067		−16.1%
1920	1,165		9.2%
1930	941		−19.2%
1940	1,068		13.5%
1950	828		−22.5%
1960	726		−12.3%
1970	495		−31.8%
1980	504		1.8%
1990	420		−16.7%
2000	552		31.4%
2010	606		9.8%
U.S. Decennial Census; 1899 (shown as 1900) 1910-1930; 1930-1950 1960 1980-2000 2010

== See also ==
- List of communities in Puerto Rico
