= Adjuntas, Puerto Rico =

Town and municipality located in Puerto Rico

Adjuntas Municipio Autónomo de Adjuntas
- Town and Municipality
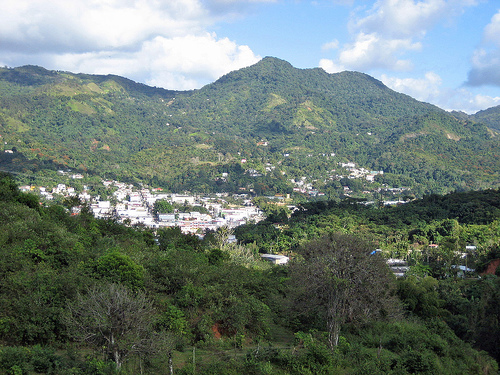
- View of Adjuntas Pueblo and El Gigante Dormido from a nearby mountain.

- Flag Coat of arms
- Nicknames: La Ciudad del Gigante Dormido, La Suiza de Puerto Rico, La Tierra de Lagos
- Anthem: Adjuntas es mi amor
- Map of Puerto Rico highlighting Adjuntas Municipality
- Coordinates: 18°09′46″N 66°43′20″W
- Sovereign state: United States
- Commonwealth: Puerto Rico
- Settled: 1739
- Founded: August 11, 1815
- Founder: Diego Maldonado
- Barrios: 17 barrios: Adjuntas barrio-pueblo; Capáez; Garzas; Guayabo Dulce; Guayo; Guilarte; Juan González; Limaní; Pellejas; Portillo; Portugués; Saltillo; Tanamá; Vegas Abajo; Vegas Arriba; Yahuecas; Yayales

Government
  - Mayor: José Soto Rivera (PPD)
  - Senatorial dist.: 5 – Ponce
  - Representative dist.: 22

Area
  - Total: 67.10 sq mi (173.8 km^{2})
  - Land: 66.69 sq mi (172.7 km^{2})
  - Water: .41 sq mi (1.1 km^{2})
- Elevation: 2,316 ft (706 m)

Population (2020)
  - Total: 18,020
  - Estimate (2025): 17,994 ▼
  - Rank: 62nd in Puerto Rico
  - Density: 270.2/sq mi (104.3/km^{2})
- Demonym: Adjunteños
- Time zone: UTC−4 (AST)
- ZIP Codes: 00601, 00631
- Area code: 787/939
- Major routes: link = Puerto Rico Highway 10 link = Puerto Rico Highway 123 link = Puerto Rico Highway 129 link = Puerto Rico Highway 135 link = Puerto Rico Highway 143 link = Puerto Rico Highway 131
- Website: adjuntaspr.com

Adjuntas (Spanish pronunciation: [aðˈxuntas]) is a small mountainside town and municipality in Puerto Rico located in the central midwestern portion of the island on the Cordillera Central, north of Yauco, Guayanilla, and Peñuelas; southeast of Utuado; east of Lares and Yauco; and northwest of Ponce. Adjuntas is spread over 16 barrios and Adjuntas Pueblo (the downtown area and the administrative center of the city). Adjuntas is about two hours by car westward from the capital, San Juan.

Adjuntas is nicknamed "the Switzerland of Puerto Rico" because of its relatively chilly weather. Many Puerto Rican mountain towns have cooler weather than the rest of the island; Adjuntas is no exception: the average yearly weather is 70 °F (21 °C) (High: 83 °F/28 °C; Low: 58 °F/14 °C). Puerto Rico's lowest temperature were recorded in Adjuntas at 38 °F in 2018. Its mild climate attracts a good number of island tourists during the summer months. The town has a small hotel named Monte Rio and a good-sized parador, or country inn, called Villa Sotomayor.

Adjuntas' ZIP Code, 00601, is the lowest standard ZIP code in the United States ZIP code system.

== Etymology and nicknames ==
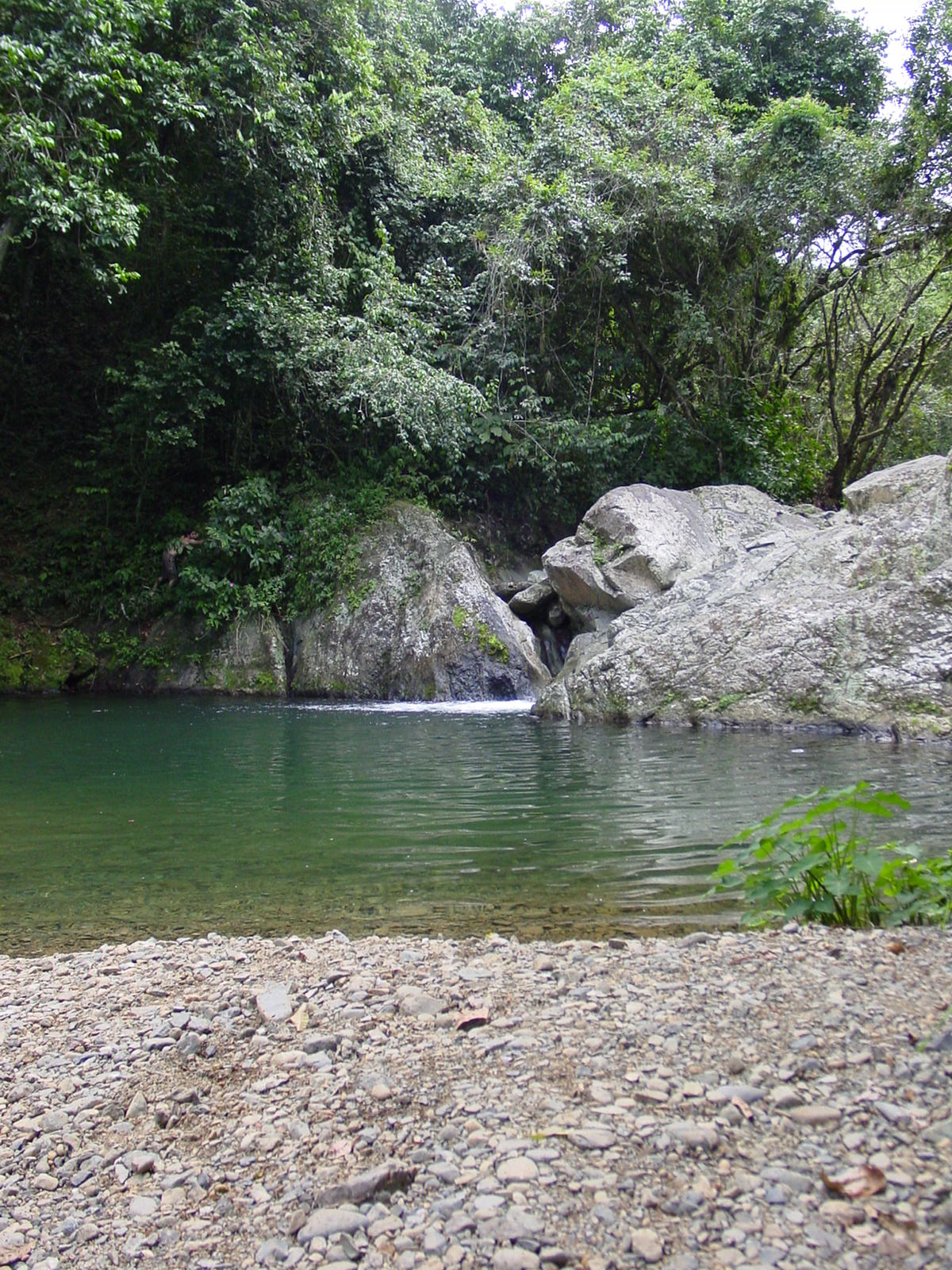
Charco Mangó, one of the many natural pools or charcas that give the municipality its nickname of La Tierra de los Lagos.

The name Adjuntas translates to "attached" in Spanish. The name is most likely a shortening of "tierras adjuntas a Coamo" or 'lands attached (or in proximity) to Coamo" as the territory was originally part of the lands of Villa de San Blas de Illescas, one of the oldest settlements in Puerto Rico, which the municipality gained autonomy from in 1739.

The municipality has received numerous nicknames throughout its history, such as La Ciudad del Gigante Dormido, Spanish for "city of the sleeping giant" after the mountain that overlooks the town; La Suiza de Puerto Rico ("Puerto Rico's Switzerland") due to its relative cool temperatures and mountainous terrain; and La Tierra de los Lagos ("Land of the Lakes") after the many natural pools or charcas that are formed by the numerous rivers that flow through the municipality.

== History ==
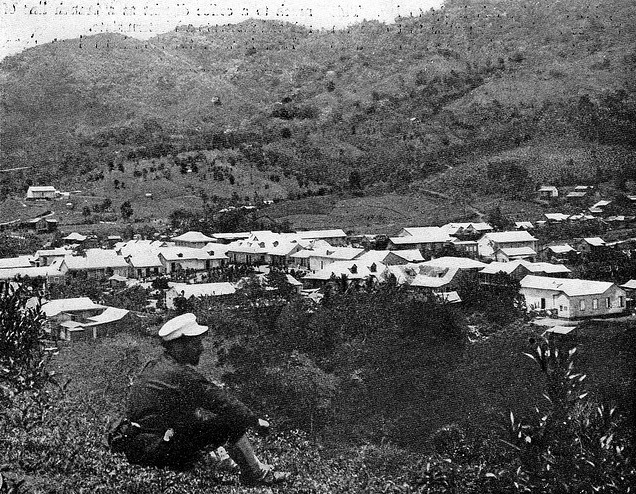
Adjuntas in the early 20th century

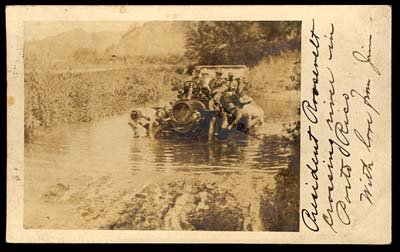
Postcard of President Theodore Roosevelt during his visit to Adjuntas

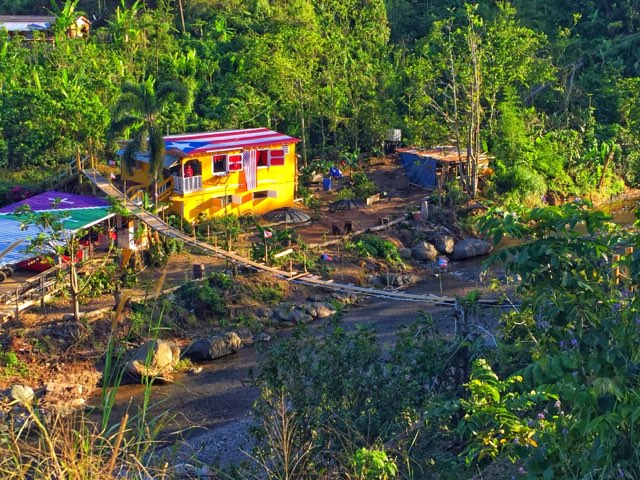
Residents built a foot bridge to access their home in Adjuntas after Hurricane Maria

Although there are petroglyphs and traces of Taíno people in Adjuntas, there is no proof that the region was dominated by any specific cacique. Nearby caciques like Guarionex and Urayoán could have had some control over the area.

According to historian Aurelio Tió, during the Spanish colonization of Puerto Rico in the 16th century, it is believed that a Spanish interpreter called Juan González settled in the region. Also, historian Cayetano Coll y Toste wrote a legend about Spanish people looking for gold in the region of Adjuntas.

As colonization progressed, Adjuntas became part of the San Blas de Illescas (Coamo village), which was founded in 1579 and became the most important settlement in the south. It is believed that the name "Adjuntas" derives from the term of "being close" to Coamo. As population shifted to Ponce, Adjuntas became more linked to that town, and then to Utuado, being a barrio of this municipality in 1739.

With 20 families established in the region, the residents of Adjuntas asked for the settlement to be officially recognized. The town of Adjuntas was then founded on August 11, 1815, with Diego Maldonado being elected as its representative. A city hall and public square were built shortly after.

Adjuntas was one of the main cities where the Anusim, Maranos, and other Sephardi Jews settled in Puerto Rico.

After the mid-19th century, Adjuntas welcomed many immigrants from the Mediterranean islands Corsica and Mallorca. Some of them established coffee plantations. During the last decades of the 19th century, the coffee produced in Adjuntas was exported to Europe, United States and even the Vatican.

Adjuntas was proclaimed a "villa", or a first order municipality, by the Spanish Government Monarchy in 1894. Several years after, the town was occupied by the United States Army forces during the Spanish–American War of 1898 and was visited by President Theodore Roosevelt in 1906.

The discovery of rich deposits of copper, gold and other minerals during the 1960s motivated some local community and environmental leaders to oppose the mining. Casa Pueblo, a local community organization settled in Adjuntas, opposed to the mining and advocates for the preservation of natural resources in Puerto Rico.

In 1992, Southern Gold Resources, a US company, was granted permission to explore for gold in Adjuntas and Utuado, Puerto Rico.

Hurricane Maria on September 20, 2017, triggered numerous landslides all across Adjuntas, with its winds and significant amount of rain, 18.38 inches in Adjuntas. The hurricane winds and rain damaged infrastructure and the electrical system of Adjuntas collapsed leaving its over 18,000 residents with no electrical power. PR-10 which connects Adjuntas to Utuado collapsed by 9 feet, and according to the mayor of Adjuntas, 1500 homes were completely destroyed. Nearly 62% of the residents of Adjuntas were already living below the poverty level when Hurricane Maria hit Puerto Rico. The municipality was also affected by the 2020 earthquakes which caused landslides and power outages in the region.

== Geography ==
The terrain of Adjuntas is very mountainous due to its location in the Cordillera Central. It borders Utuado in the north and east, Lares and Yauco to the west, and Guayanilla, Peñuelas, and Ponce to the south.

Historian Pedro Tomás de Córdova described the terrain as "high, and mountainous, and very healthy". He also praised the quality of the terrain for agriculture. Adjuntas' highest peak is Monte Guilarte (3,773 ft; 1,150 m), followed by Vaquiñas (3,346 ft; 1,020 m). Guilarte itself is the sixth highest peak in Puerto Rico and is located in Guilarte State Forest. Córdova also mentioned the water features, describing 26 rivers and 16 creeks that ran through the region.

=== Bodies of water ===
The following rivers flow through Adjuntas: Río Cidra, Río Corcho, Rio de la Ciénaga, Río Garzas, Río Guilarte, Río Limaní, Río Saltillo, Río Toro, Río Vacas, and Río Yahuecas. There aren't any beaches in Adjuntas given that it is landlocked.

=== Barrios ===
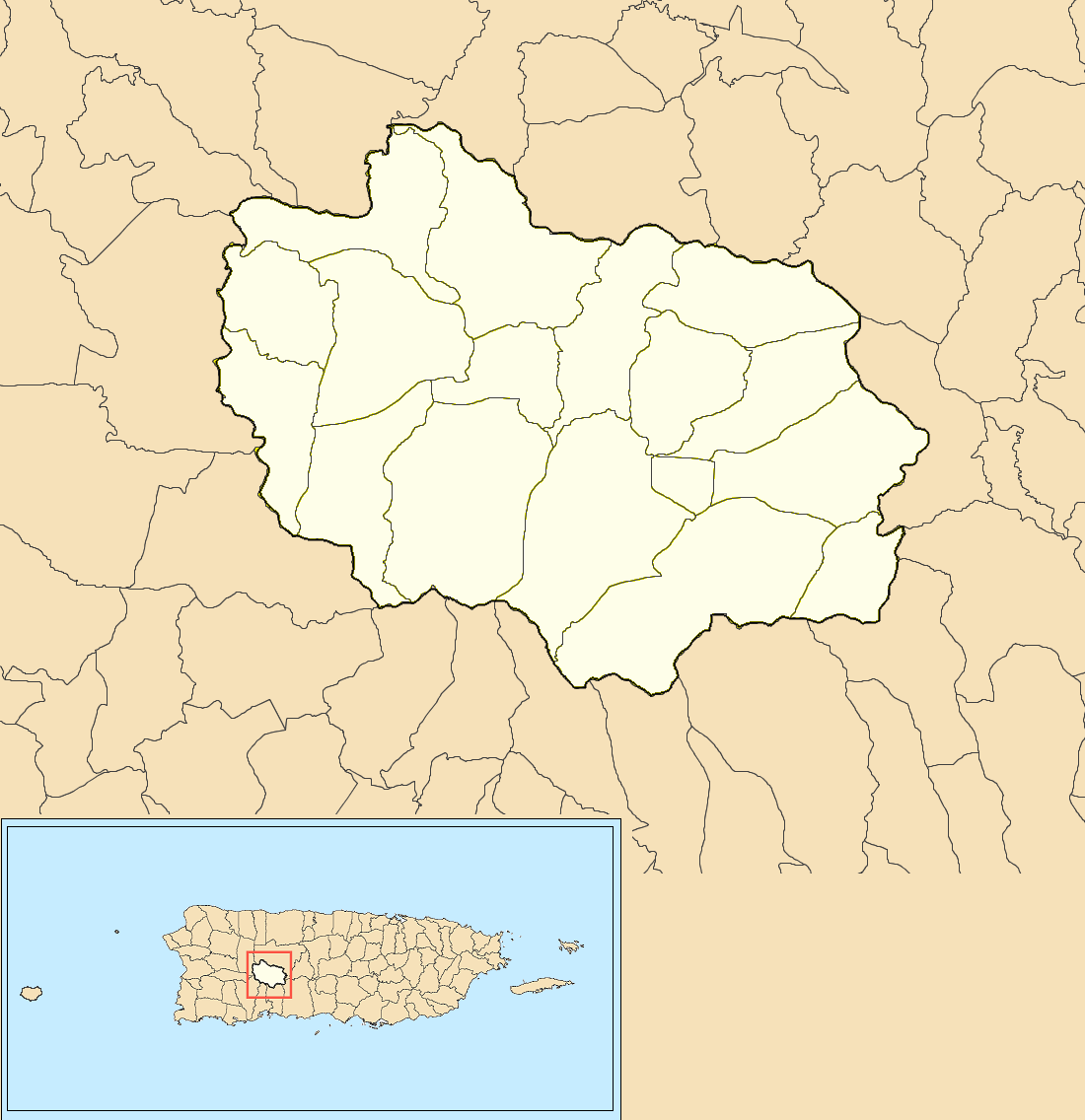
Subdivisions of Adjuntas, Puerto Rico.

The municipality of Adjuntas is made up of 17 barrios, including the barrio-pueblo.

1. Adjuntas barrio-pueblo
2. Capáez
3. Garzas
4. Guayabo Dulce
5. Guayo
6. Guilarte
7. Juan González
8. Limaní
9. Pellejas
10. Portillo
11. Portugués
12. Saltillo
13. Tanamá
14. Vegas Abajo
15. Vegas Arriba
16. Yahuecas
17. Yayales

=== Sectors ===
Barrios (which are like minor civil divisions) and subbarrios, are further subdivided into smaller areas called sectores (sectors in English). The types of sectores may vary, from normally sector to urbanización to reparto to barriada to residencial, among others.

=== Climate ===
Adjuntas (Climate – Tropical Rainforest (Af))

Climate chart (precipitation, max. and min. temperature)
J	F	M	A	M	J	J	A	S	O	N	D
2.5 80 54	2.5 80 53	3.8 81 54	7.2 82 57	9.5 83 60	5 85 61	6 85 61	8.4 85 61	13 85 61	11 84 60	6.7 82 59	3.2 80 56
- █ Average max. and min. temperatures in °F
- █ Precipitation totals in inches
Metric conversion
J	F	M	A	M	J	J	A	S	O	N	D
64 26 12	64 27 12	96 27 12	184 28 14	242 28 15	127 29 16	152 29 16	212 30 16	318 29 16	290 29 15	170 28 15	81 27 13
- █ Average max. and min. temperatures in °C
- █ Precipitation totals in mm

Adjuntas features a tropical rainforest climate that borders on a subtropical highland climate. While the town technically features a tropical rainforest climate, due to its high elevation, the climate is noticeably cooler than the norm for this climate category. Summers are warm (83°-85 °F) in the daytime and mild at nighttime (60°-63 °F). Meanwhile, winters are moderately warm with cool temperatures at night. During daytime, high temperatures are around 79 °F (26 °C) in the town and 68 °F (20 °C) in the nearby mountains. Winter night temperatures are between in the 55 °F (13 °C) and 60 °F (16 °C) range, but after cold fronts temperatures can drop down to 45 °F (7 °C). Adjuntas' summer climate is comparable to higher altitude locations near the equator (albeit with warmer winters), such as Medellín, while its winters are comparable to higher latitude locations at the limit of the tropics such as West Palm Beach.

Climate data for Adjuntas, Puerto Rico (1991–2020 normals, extremes 1970–present)
Month	Jan	Feb	Mar	Apr	May	Jun	Jul	Aug	Sep	Oct	Nov	Dec	Year
Record high °F (°C)	89 (32)	92 (33)	90 (32)	93 (34)	93 (34)	92 (33)	92 (33)	92 (33)	91 (33)	91 (33)	93 (34)	88 (31)	93 (34)
Mean daily maximum °F (°C)	79.3 (26.3)	79.8 (26.6)	80.2 (26.8)	81.4 (27.4)	82.6 (28.1)	84.6 (29.2)	84.9 (29.4)	85.1 (29.5)	84.8 (29.3)	84.0 (28.9)	82.0 (27.8)	79.9 (26.6)	82.4 (28.0)
Daily mean °F (°C)	67.9 (19.9)	67.7 (19.8)	68.5 (20.3)	70.3 (21.3)	72.3 (22.4)	74.0 (23.3)	74.1 (23.4)	74.4 (23.6)	74.0 (23.3)	73.3 (22.9)	71.6 (22.0)	69.1 (20.6)	71.4 (21.9)
Mean daily minimum °F (°C)	56.6 (13.7)	55.6 (13.1)	58.7 (14.8)	59.2 (15.1)	62.0 (16.7)	63.3 (17.4)	63.2 (17.3)	63.6 (17.6)	63.3 (17.4)	62.6 (17.0)	61.2 (16.2)	58.3 (14.6)	60.5 (15.8)
Record low °F (°C)	41 (5)	43 (6)	40 (4)	46 (8)	47 (8)	50 (10)	51 (11)	52 (11)	46 (8)	48 (9)	42 (6)	40 (4)	40 (4)
Average precipitation inches (mm)	2.62 (67)	2.58 (66)	4.44 (113)	7.23 (184)	9.88 (251)	4.57 (116)	5.74 (146)	9.08 (231)	12.94 (329)	10.85 (276)	6.68 (170)	3.59 (91)	80.20 (2,037)
Average precipitation days (≥ 0.01 in)	13.8	12.1	12.9	15.8	17.3	12.4	15.4	17.6	20.1	19.6	18.5	15.7	191.2
Source: NOAA

== Demographics ==
Historical population
Census	Pop.	Note	%±
1900	19,484		—
1910	16,954		−13.0%
1920	17,988		6.1%
1930	18,075		0.5%
1940	22,556		24.8%
1950	22,424		−0.6%
1960	19,658		−12.3%
1970	18,691		−4.9%
1980	18,786		0.5%
1990	19,451		3.5%
2000	19,143		−1.6%
2010	19,483		1.8%
2020	18,020		−7.5%
2025 (est.)	17,994	▼	−0.1%
U.S. Decennial Census; 1899 (shown as 1900) 1910–1930; 1930–1950 1960–2000 2010 2020

Racial – (self-defined) Adjuntas, Puerto Rico – 2010 Census
Race	Population	% of Total
White	18,146	93.1%
Black/African American	603	3.1%
American Indian and Alaska Native	68	0.4%
Asian	5	0.0%
Native Hawaiian; Pacific Islander	1	0.0%
Some other race	411	2.1%
Two or more races	249	1.3%

In 2020, Adjuntas had a population of 18,020.

80% of the per capita income of Adjuntas is a product of agriculture. In 2010, unemployment hit 20.2%. According to mayor, Jaime Barlucea, it decreased to 18.7 in 2011. However, according to the Department of Employment of Puerto Rico, it increased to 21.3.

The municipality of Adjuntas previously formed the Adjuntas Micropolitan Statistical Area, and it has been included in the Ponce Metropolitan Statistical Area since the 2020 US Census.

=== Special Communities ===
Comunidades Especiales de Puerto Rico (Special Communities of Puerto Rico) are marginalized communities whose citizens are experiencing a certain amount of social exclusion. A map shows these communities occur in nearly every municipality of the commonwealth. Of the 742 places that were on the list in 2014, the following barrios, communities, sectors, or neighborhoods were in Adjuntas: Acueducto neighborhood, Calle del Agua, Guayo barrio, Rullán neighborhood, Saltillo Vaca, Tanamá barrio, and Yahuecas barrio.

== Economy ==
=== Agriculture ===
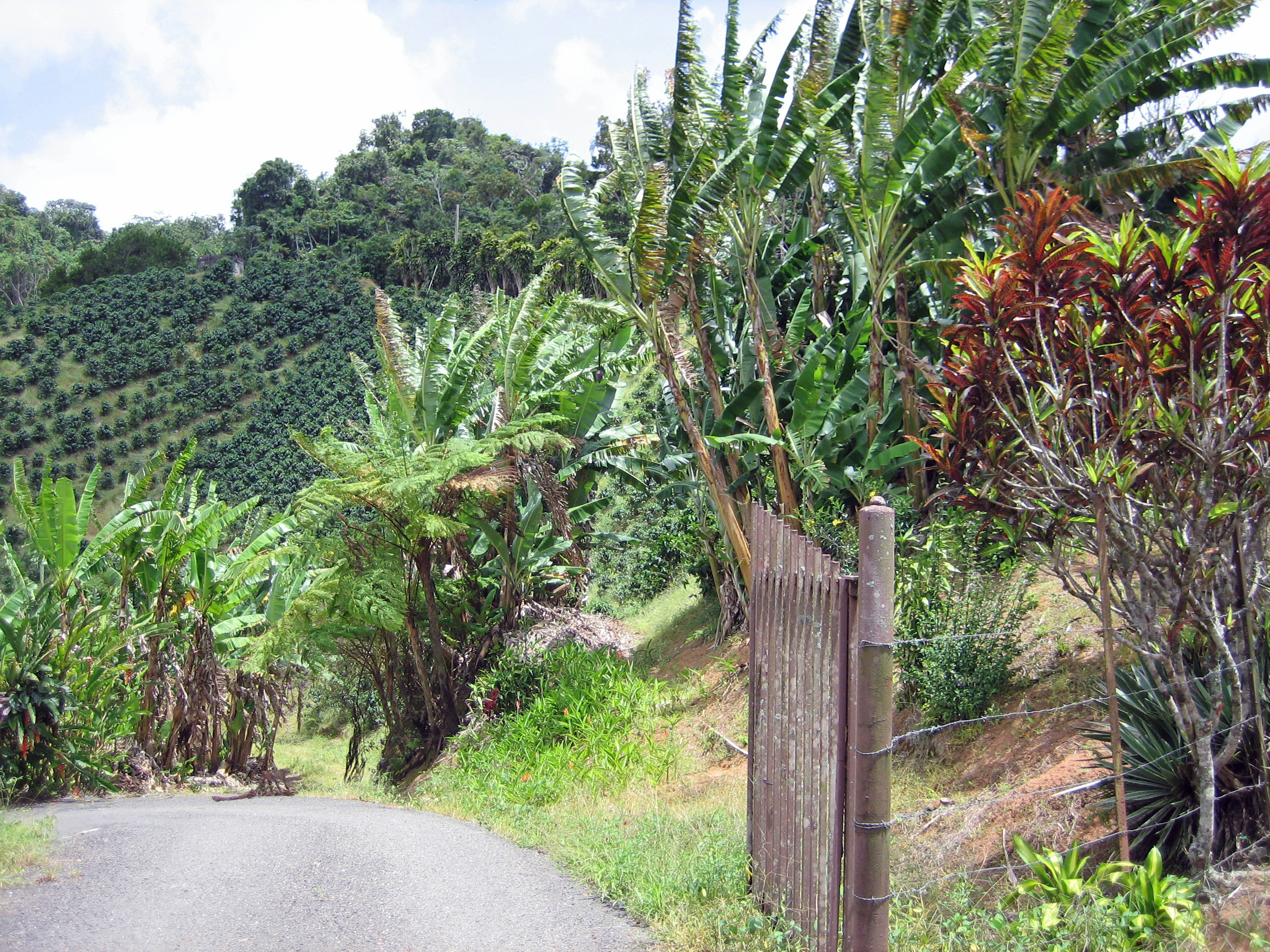
A coffee and banana farm in Adjuntas

Since its foundation in the 19th century, the production of coffee, sugarcane, bananas, small fruits, and cattle have formed the foundation of the economy of Adjuntas. During the middle of the 20th century, however, the production of sugar declined with the arrival of manufacturing industries. Being home to the 1943-established Cooperativa de Cosecheros de Cidra, Adjuntas is the main producer of citron (cidra) in Puerto Rico, and thanks to its milder weather, it also produces "cold-climate" fruit such as apples and peaches that are much harder to grow elsewhere in the island. Adjuntas is still the main producer of coffee on the island.

After the economic hardships caused by Hurricane Maria in 2017, some economic gains were being made by a number of women working in agriculture in Adjuntas.

=== Industry ===
During the middle of the 20th century, some manufacturing industries established themselves in town as part of Operation Bootstrap. However, as of 2012, most of them have already closed. One of the last manufacturing companies in town, a military uniforms company, closed in March 2012.

=== Tourism ===
Although tourism hasn't been an integral part of the economy of Adjuntas, according to historic records, it has been present since the 19th century. Historian Lidio Cruz Monclova noted that around 1871, some doctors requested patients to travel to Adjuntas to stay in a hotel called "La Adjunteña". The hotel was the property of C.L. Ginestre, and served both tourists and the sick. Cruz noted that doctors believed the colder temperatures of the town were beneficial to health.

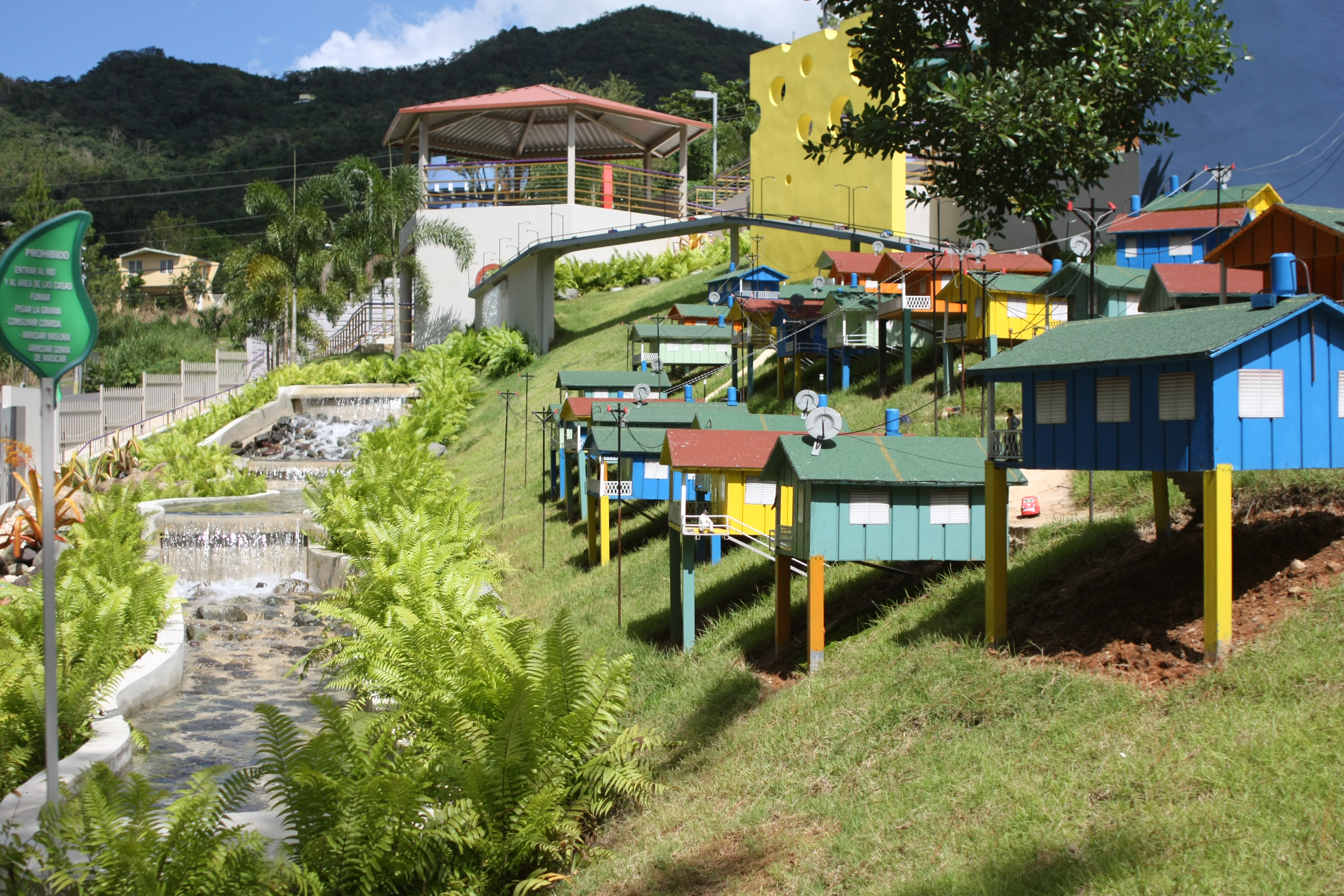
Castillo de los Niños

In 2018, Adjuntas received approximately 700 tourists on weekends, according to mayor Jaime Barlucea. Most of them want to visit the haciendas established there during past centuries. Some of them are: Hacienda Don Juan, Hacienda Bareal, Hacienda El Muerto, Hacienda Arbela, and Hacienda Pietri. Other landmarks are Monte Guilarte, and the Inabón waterfall.

Another known tourist stop in Adjuntas is Casa Pueblo, a local museum and cultural institution founded by a group of activists that fought against the copper mine exploitation of the area for decades. Casa Pueblo is responsible for many environmental projects, namely the preservation of hundreds of acres of woods and bodies of water.

However, some residents and businesspeople from Adjuntas maintain that the government has not taken advantage of the many tourist attractions in town, which include three forests, waterfalls, lakes, and many renowned restaurants. One of the projects that has received media coverage is the Castillo de los Niños, built during the mayoralty of Barlucea. Castillo de los Niños is a recreational park resembling a castle, with gazebos.

Villa Sotomayor is a parador, featuring ecotourism. Villa Sotomayor features food prepared with local ingredients, from a nearby estate Hacienda Nur.

In early 2021, in alliance with neighboring Lares, Adjuntas launched agri-tourism for tourists to visit haciendas where coffee is grown and processed.

There are five places in Adjuntas federally recognized for their historic significance: Las Cabañas Bridge, a one-lane bridge made of steel and concrete, which was built in 1919, Quinta Vendrell, a country house built in 1918, the Washington Irving Grade School, an early 20th-century public school, the Foreman House, a Modernist mountain summer residence designed by Henry Klumb, and the Adjuntas city hall, designed by Rafael Carmoega and built in 1927. The remnants of Hacienda Pellejas, a notable early 20th-century sugarcane plantation, is historically recognized at the commonwealth level and listed on the Puerto Rico Register of Historic Sites and Zones.

To stimulate local tourism in the aftermath of the COVID-19 pandemic in Puerto Rico, the Puerto Rico Tourism Company launched the Voy Turisteando (I'm Touring) campaign in 2021. The campaign featured a passport book with a page for each municipality. The Voy Turisteando Adjuntas passport page lists the Hacienda Tres Angeles (for agritourism), the Bosque Guilarte, and Lago Garza as places of interest for locals.

== Human resources ==
=== Education ===
In all of the island's municipalities, public education is overseen by the Puerto Rico Department of Education. When Puerto Rico was ceded by Spain in the aftermath of the Spanish–American War under the terms of the Treaty of Paris of 1898 and became a territory of the United States, there were already six public schools established in Adjuntas. Historian Cayetano Coll y Toste offered a detailed account of each of them, including the number of students, which at the time totaled 402.

As of 2018–2019 the following public schools were operational in Adjuntas:

- Domingo Massol is a rural, elementary school located in Saltillo barrio, offering grades K – 6 with about 114 students.
- Domingo Pietri Ruiz is an urban, elementary school offering K – 3 grades with about 425 students.
- Rafael Aparicio Jimenez is an urban, intermediate school offering grades 7 – 9 with about 385 students.
- Hector I Rivera is a rural school located in Yahuecas barrio, offering K – 8 with about 240 students.
- Jose Emilio Lugo is an urban, high school located in Urbanización Cerros, offering grades 10 – 12 with over 600 students.
- Jose B. Barcelo Oliver is a rural school for adults located in Saltillo barrio.

=== Public health ===
Although there are no hospitals in Adjuntas, the town does have a small treatment and diagnostic center located in Adjuntas Pueblo. Also, Castañer Hospital, which is located on the border between Adjuntas, Lares, and Maricao, offers services to the municipality.

=== Public safety ===
According to sources, there has not been a murder in Adjuntas since 2009. However, burglary and theft have increased. Some residents attribute the rise in crime to unemployment and the lack of activities for the youth.

== Culture ==
=== Festivals and events ===
Adjuntas celebrates its patron saint festival (fiestas patronales) in late July/early August. The Fiestas Patronales de San Joaquin & Santa Ana is a religious and cultural celebration in honor of Saint Joachim and Saint Anne. The festival generally features parades, games, artisans, amusement rides, regional food, and live entertainment.

Other festivals and events celebrated in Adjuntas include:

- Festival del Frío – February / March
- El Gigante Marathon – July
- Cidra Festival – August
- Feria Agrícola del Gigante Dormido – August
- Eduardo Vera Marathon – December
- Troubadour Contest – December
- Fiesta Del Acabe Del Café – December
- Businesswomen from the Mountain Market (Mercado de Mujeres Empresarias de La Montaña) once a month

=== Sports ===
The town has a professional volleyball team called Gigantes de Adjuntas that plays on the LVSM in Puerto Rico.

=== Folklore ===
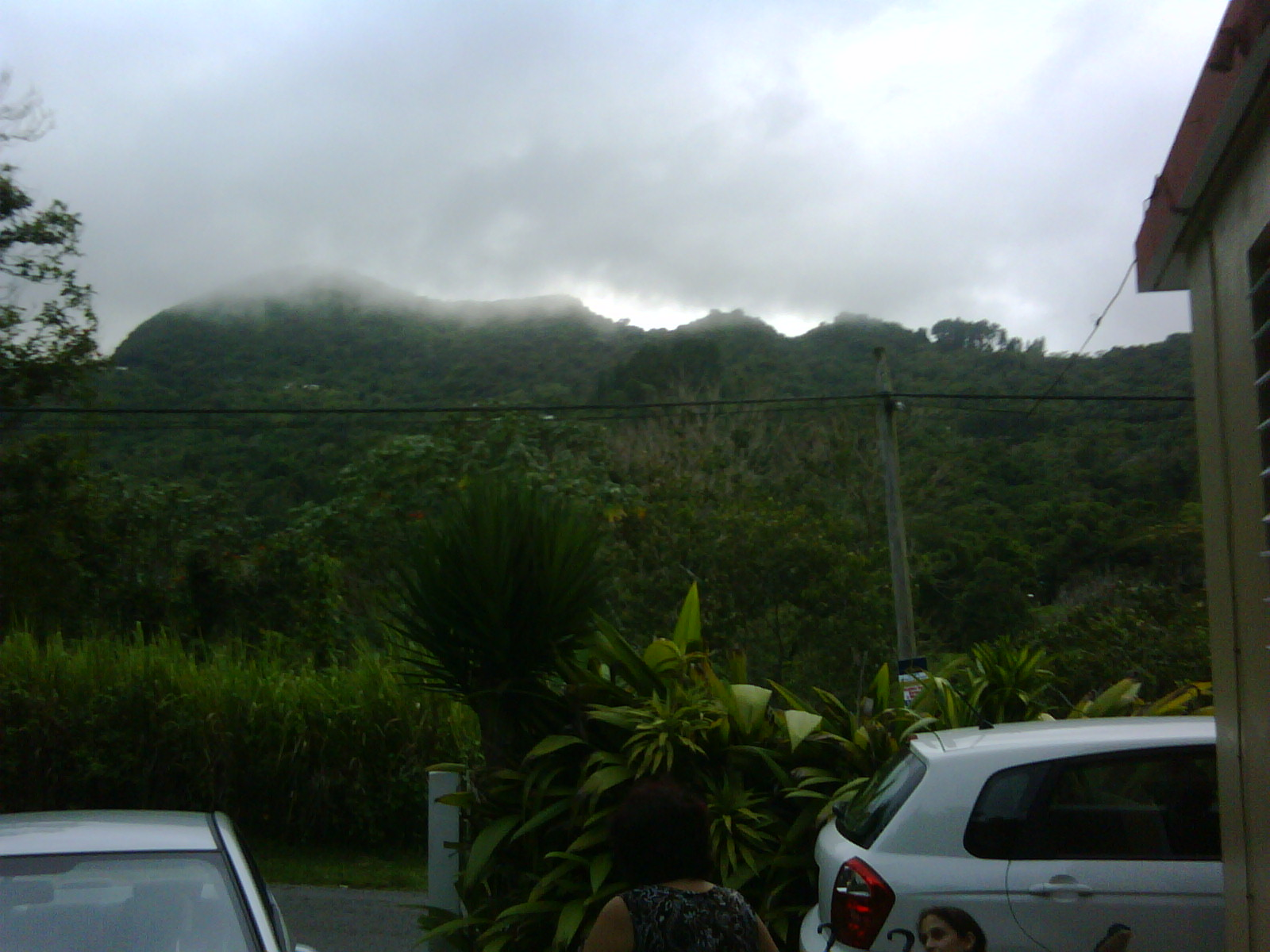
El gigante dormido

El Gigante Dormido ("the sleeping giant") is a mountain (Cerro El Gigante) and panoramic view that resembles the shape of a man lying on his back, the profile of his face is reflected in the mountain ridges of Adjuntas. Legend says that many years ago a sole resident lived in the region, and he was a giant. The people wanted to live in those fertile lands, but they would observe the giant stretching his arms widely over the area, even peeping his head over the mountain peaks. A witch learned that to kill the giant she would have to hit him in his right eye with a poisoned arrow, which she did one day as he stood up. Being hit in the eye, the giant leapt in pain and fell flat on his back but not before punching the ground hard and that formed an area from where water foamed up. Eventually, the giant on his back became petrified in that position forming the panorama of the profile of his face.

== Transportation ==
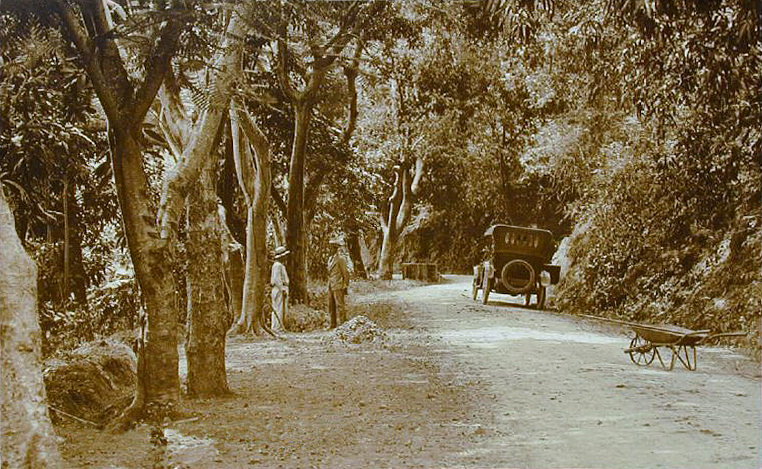
The Ponce–Adjuntas Road (PR-123) c. 1920

In 1874, General José Laureano Sanz, Governor of Puerto Rico, sponsored a road from Ponce to Arecibo, going across Adjuntas and Utuado. In 1885, it is believed that the road was under construction.

Nowadays, the main road to Adjuntas is PR-10, that connects the cities of Ponce in the south and Arecibo in the north, going across Adjuntas in the center. Before the PR-10 was built, roads like the PR-123, and other small roads were used to reach town.

There is also a small airport in Adjuntas that caters to private airplanes.

Adjuntas has 30 bridges. Built in 1919, Las Cabañas Bridge, made of steel and concrete is a one-lane, historic bridge which remains in operation.

== Government ==
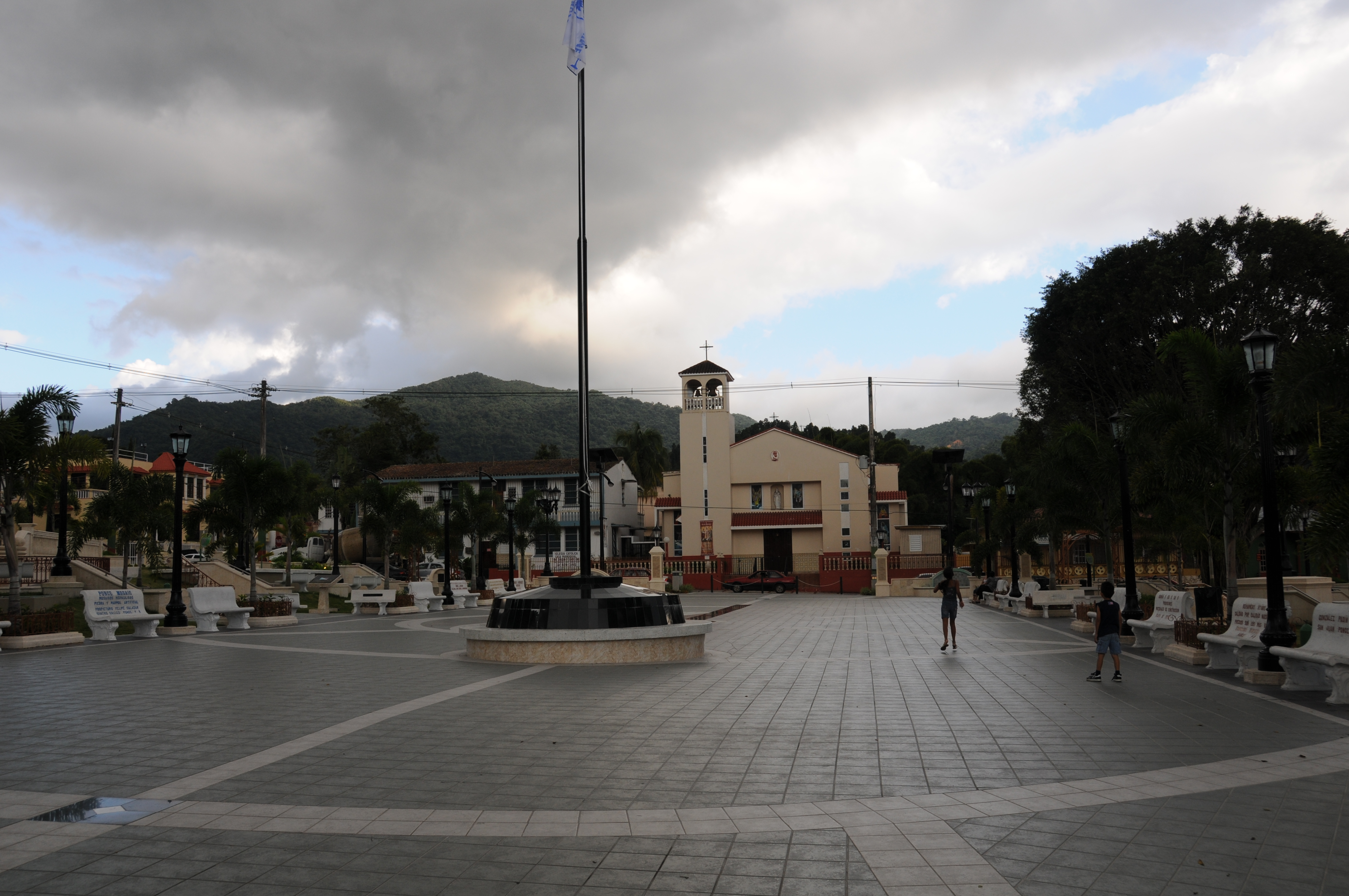
Central town square in Adjuntas barrio-pueblo, the seat of the municipal government

All municipalities in Puerto Rico are administered by a mayor, elected every four years. As of 2021, the mayor of Adjuntas is José Hiram Soto Rivera, of the Popular Democratic Party (PPD). He was first elected at the 2020 general elections.

The city belongs to the Puerto Rico Senatorial district V, which is represented by two Senators. In 2024, Marially González Huertas and Jamie Barlucea, from the Popular Democratic Party and New Progressive Party, respectively, were elected as District Senators.

== Symbols ==
The municipio has an official flag and coat of arms.

=== Coat of Arms ===
Coat of arms of Adjuntas

The coat of arms of Adjuntas is divided in two. The left side features a shepherd's staff crossed with a yarnwinder in a purple field. They symbolize the Old Testament patriarchs, representing Saint Joachim and Saint Anne, parents of the Virgin Mary. An eight-pointed star sits above them representing the Virgin.

The right side of the coat of arms is divided in three fields. The upper and lower field have green crosses in white fields. The crosses, known as "flory or fleury" are also present in the symbols of Coamo, because of the relationship between both towns. Two bells lie in the middle field, also a representation of the name of "Adjuntas".

Two coffee branches surround the coat of arms, representing Adjuntas location and its importance in the coffee industry of the island. The castle at the top represents the title of village given to Adjuntas by Spain in 1894.

=== Flag ===
The flag of Adjuntas has similar symbolisms. A white diagonal stripe divides the flag in two triangles. The upper one is purple, while the lower one is green. In the middle of each triangle lies a white "cross fleury". The white color symbolizes purity, while purple represents Saint Joachim's cloth and green the nature of the town.

=== Anthem ===
The anthem of Adjuntas was written by José Nieves Pérez and is called Adjuntas, mi amor.

== Notable Adjunteños ==
- César Luis González – The first Puerto Rican pilot in the United States Army Air Forces and the first Puerto Rican pilot to die in World War II. His name is listed on the "Roll of Honor" of the 314th Troop Carrier Group World War II and Adjuntas has honored his memory by naming a street, Calle Cesar González, after him.
- Norman Maldonado – One of Puerto Rico's leading hematologists and former president of the University of Puerto Rico.
- Aristides A. Moll Boscana – Poet, writer, translator and politician. He was the first Puerto Rican to write a complete modernista poetry book: Mi misa rosa (1905). He worked as a technical writer for the U.S. government, as a translator of the first Spanish-language edition of the Journal of the American Medical Association, and as Secretary of the Pan American Sanitary Bureau in Washington, D.C., where he edited the Latin American edition of its bulletin. He participated of many Latin American public health conferences, the first World Health Organization (WHO) conference in Paris, France, and represented El Salvador during the WHO constitutional conference in New York. He wrote many public health related essays and prepared two bilingual (Spanish–English) medical dictionaries and a Spanish medical manual for physicians. He published Æsculapius in Latin America, (a History of Medicine in the Americas).

== See also ==
- List of Puerto Ricans
- History of Puerto Rico
