= Vegas Abajo, Adjuntas, Puerto Rico =

Barrio in Adjuntas, Puerto Rico

Vegas Abajo
- Barrio
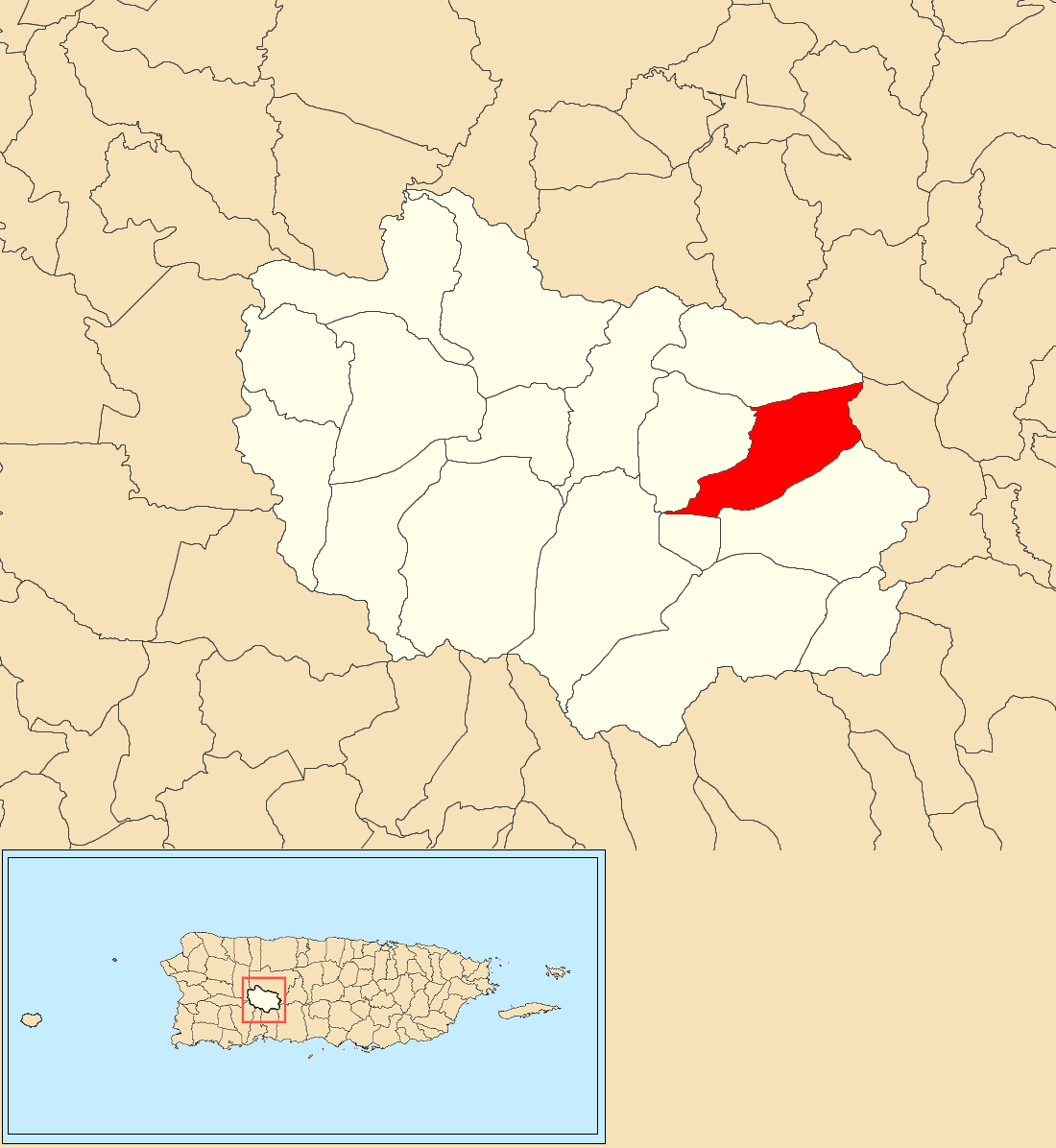
- Location of Vegas Abajo barrio within the municipality of Adjuntas shown in red

- Location of Puerto Rico
- Coordinates: 18°11′07″N 66°42′04″W
- Commonwealth: Puerto Rico
- Municipality: Adjuntas

Area
  - Total: 3.09 sq mi (8.0 km^{2})
  - Land: 3.09 sq mi (8.0 km^{2})
  - Water: 0 sq mi (0 km^{2})
- Elevation: 1,745 ft (532 m)

Population (2010)
  - Total: 605
  - Density: 195.8/sq mi (75.6/km^{2})
- Source: 2010 Census
- Time zone: UTC−4 (AST)
- Website: adjuntaspr.com

Vegas Abajo is a rural barrio in the municipality of Adjuntas, Puerto Rico.

== History ==
Vegas Abajo was in Spain's gazetteers until Puerto Rico was ceded by Spain in the aftermath of the Spanish–American War under the terms of the Treaty of Paris of 1898 and became an unincorporated territory of the United States. In 1899, the United States Department of War conducted a census of Puerto Rico finding that the combined population of Guayo barrio and Vegas Abajo barrios was 1,275.

Historical population
Census	Pop.	Note	%±
1910	690		—
1920	735		6.5%
1930	467		−36.5%
1940	722		54.6%
1950	543		−24.8%
1960	478		−12.0%
1970	550		15.1%
1980	399		−27.5%
1990	456		14.3%
2000	518		13.6%
2010	605		16.8%
U.S. Decennial Census; 1900 (N/A) 1910-1930; 1930-1950 1960 1980-2000 2010

== See also ==
- List of communities in Puerto Rico
