= Vegas Arriba, Adjuntas, Puerto Rico =

Barrio in Puerto Rico

Vegas Arriba
- Barrio
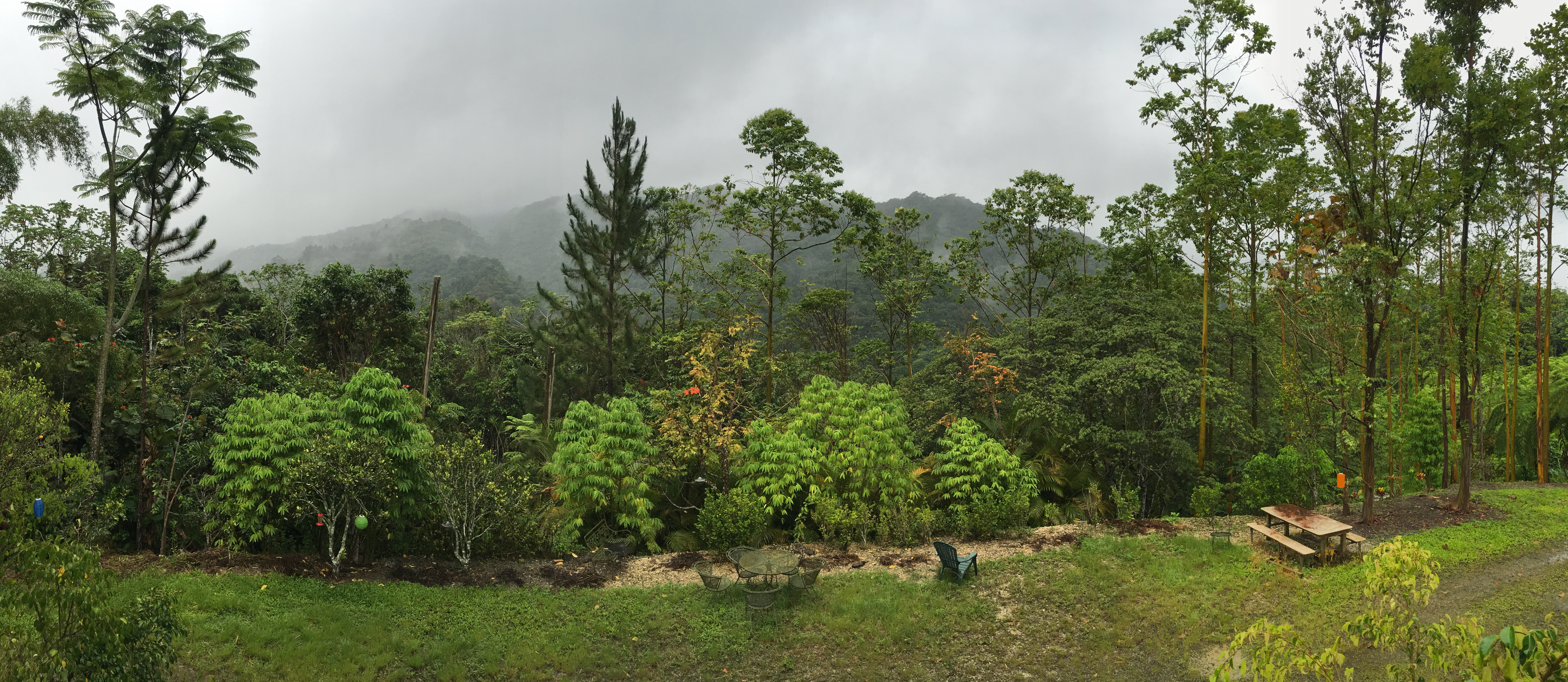
- Vegas Arriba in Adjuntas

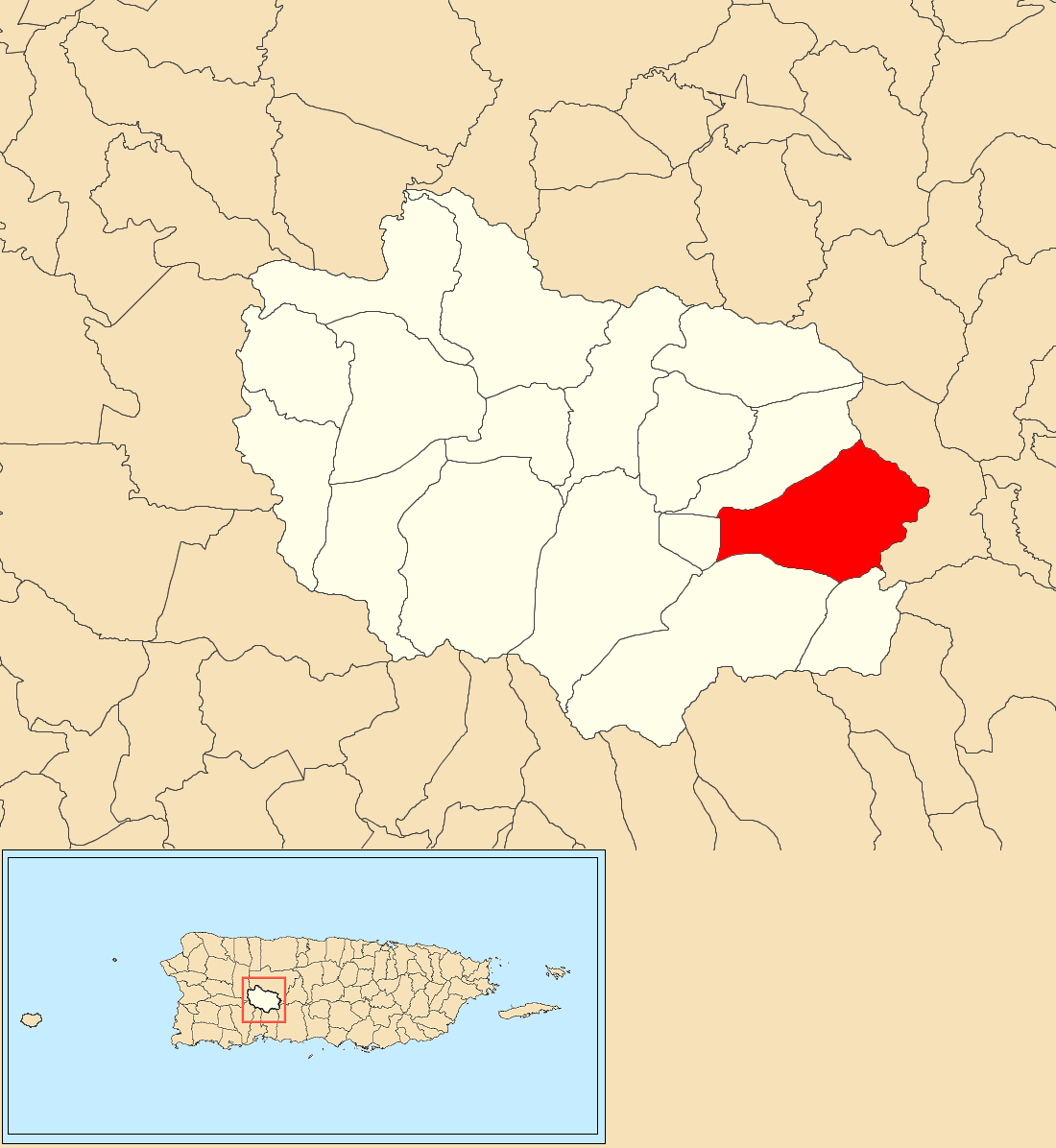
- Location of Vegas Arriba barrio within the municipality of Adjuntas shown in red

- Location of Puerto Rico
- Coordinates: 18°10′14″N 66°41′20″W
- Commonwealth: Puerto Rico
- Municipality: Adjuntas

Area
  - Total: 4.59 sq mi (11.9 km^{2})
  - Land: 4.59 sq mi (11.9 km^{2})
  - Water: 0 sq mi (0 km^{2})
- Elevation: 2,116 ft (645 m)

Population (2010)
  - Total: 1,207
  - Density: 263/sq mi (102/km^{2})
- Source: 2010 Census
- Time zone: UTC−4 (AST)
- Website: adjuntaspr.com

Vegas Arriba is a rural barrio in the municipality of Adjuntas, Puerto Rico.

== History ==
Vegas Arriba was in Spain's gazetteers until Puerto Rico was ceded by Spain in the aftermath of the Spanish–American War under the terms of the Treaty of Paris of 1898 and became an unincorporated territory of the United States. In 1899, the United States Department of War conducted a census of Puerto Rico finding that the population of Vegas Arriba barrio was 1,159.

Historical population
Census	Pop.	Note	%±
1900	1,159		—
1910	861		−25.7%
1920	1,028		19.4%
1930	1,190		15.8%
1940	1,305		9.7%
1950	960		−26.4%
1960	980		2.1%
1970	994		1.4%
1980	964		−3.0%
1990	1,438		49.2%
2000	1,131		−21.3%
2010	1,207		6.7%
U.S. Decennial Census; 1899 (shown as 1900) 1910-1930; 1930-1950 1960 1980-2000 2010

== See also ==
- List of communities in Puerto Rico
