= Saltillo, Adjuntas, Puerto Rico =

Barrio in Puerto Rico

Saltillo
- Barrio
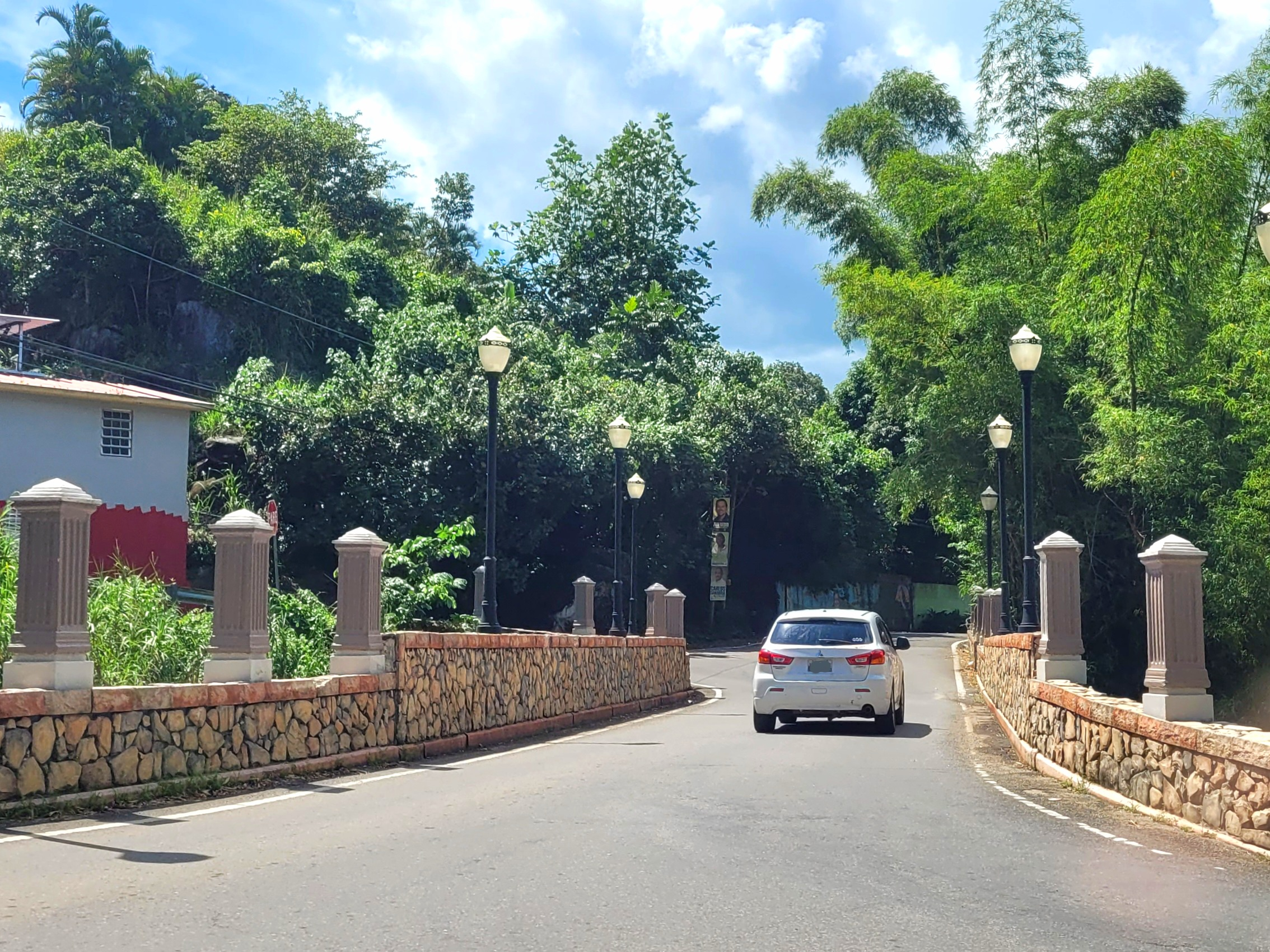
- Puerto Rico Highway 518 between Saltillo and Adjuntas barrio-pueblo

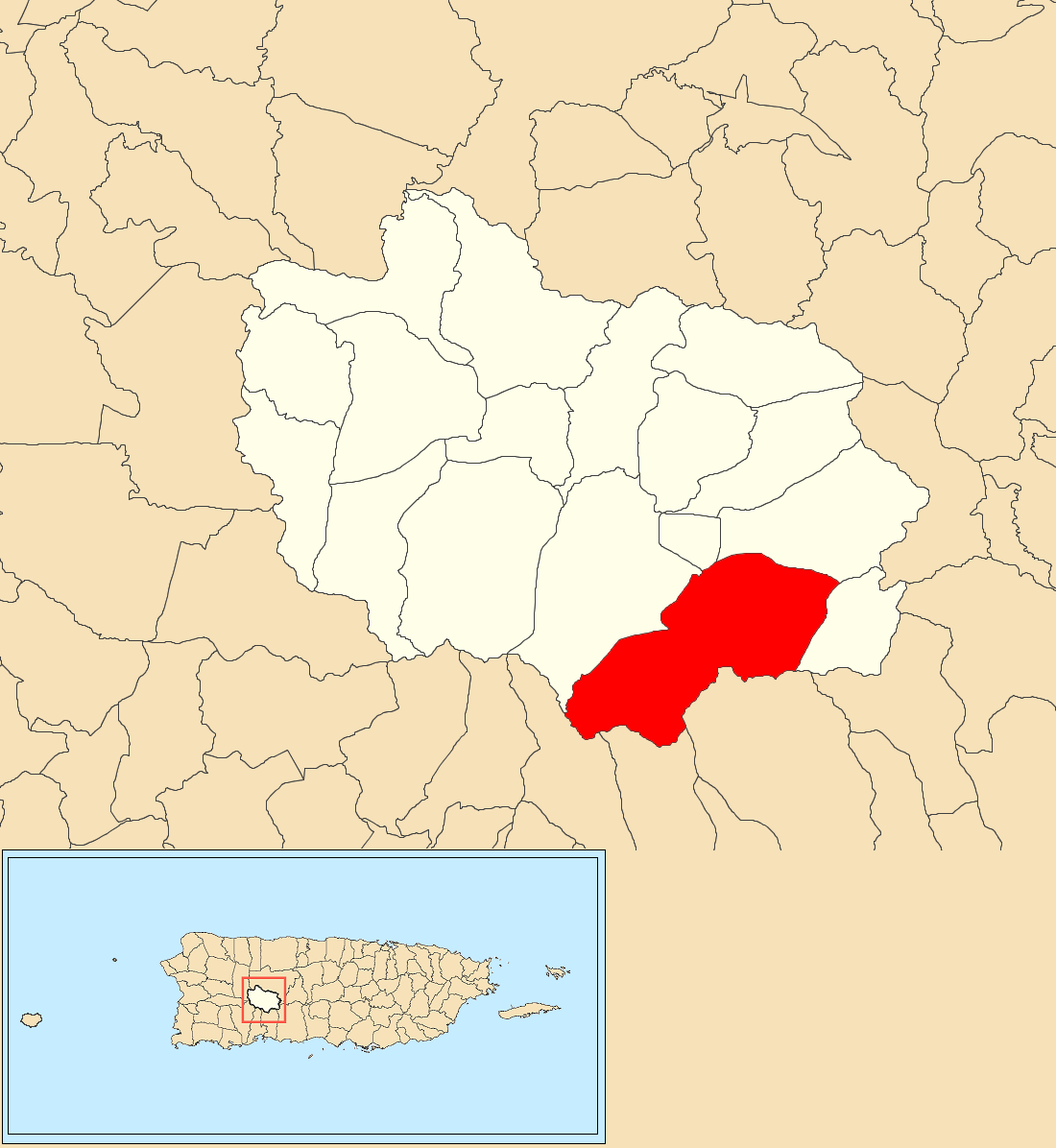
- Location of Saltillo barrio within the municipality of Adjuntas shown in red

- Location within the Caribbean
- Coordinates: 18°08′02″N 66°43′12″W
- Commonwealth: Puerto Rico
- Municipality: Adjuntas

Area
  - Total: 7.22 sq mi (18.7 km^{2})
  - Land: 7.16 sq mi (18.5 km^{2})
  - Water: 0.06 sq mi (0.16 km^{2})
- Elevation: 3,146 ft (959 m)

Population (2010)
  - Total: 2,664
  - Density: 372.1/sq mi (143.7/km^{2})
- Source: 2010 Census
- Time zone: UTC−4 (AST)
- Website: adjuntaspr.com

Saltillo is a rural barrio in the municipality of Adjuntas, Puerto Rico.

== History ==
Saltillo was in Spain's gazetteers until Puerto Rico was ceded by Spain in the aftermath of the Spanish–American War under the terms of the Treaty of Paris of 1898 and became an unincorporated territory of the United States. In 1899, the United States Department of War conducted a census of Puerto Rico finding that the population of Saltillo barrio was 2,098.

Historical population
Census	Pop.	Note	%±
1900	2,098		—
1910	1,843		−12.2%
1920	1,847		0.2%
1930	2,030		9.9%
1940	3,164		55.9%
1950	2,166		−31.5%
1960	1,861		−14.1%
1970	2,055		10.4%
1980	2,296		11.7%
1990	2,361		2.8%
2000	2,678		13.4%
2010	2,664		−0.5%
U.S. Decennial Census; 1899 (shown as 1900) 1910-1930; 1930-1950 1960 1980-2000 2010

== See also ==
- List of communities in Puerto Rico
