= Capáez, Adjuntas, Puerto Rico =

Barrio in Puerto Rico

Capáez
- Barrio
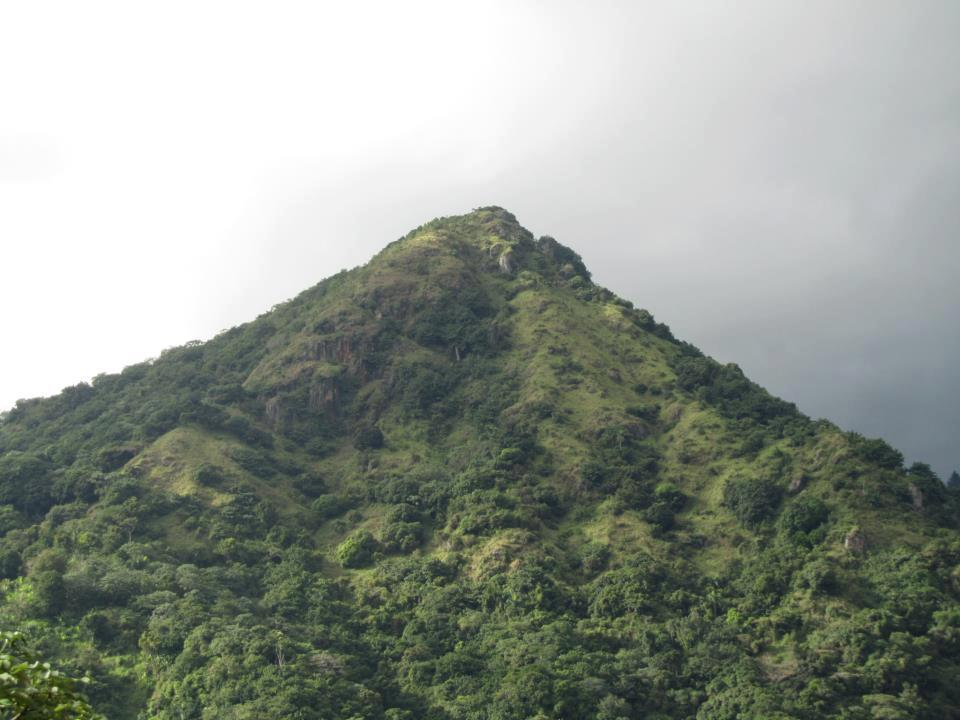
- Monte Hormiga peak in Capáez

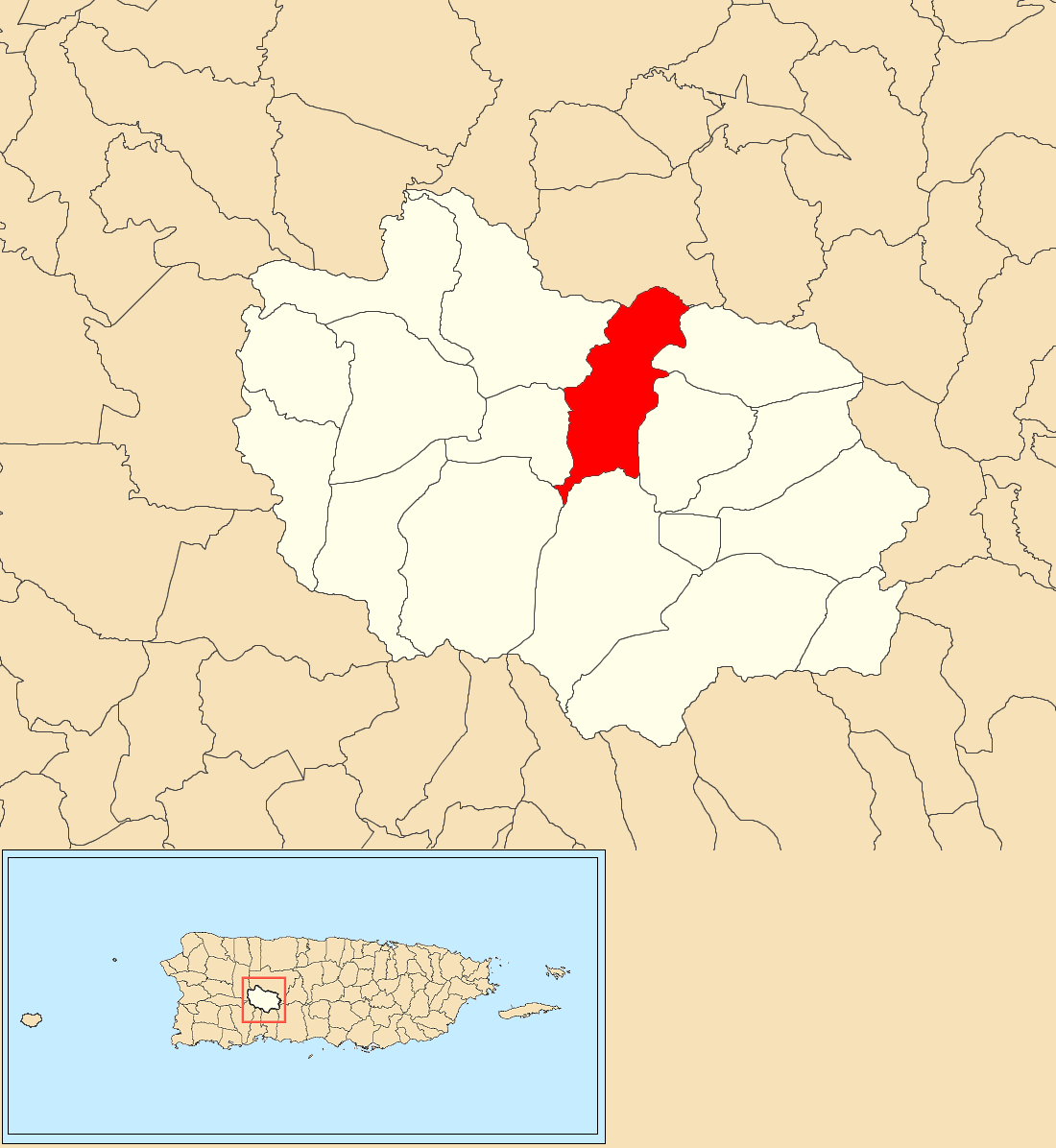
- Location of Capáez within the municipality of Adjuntas shown in red

- Location of Puerto Rico
- Coordinates: 18°12′07″N 66°44′34″W
- Commonwealth: Puerto Rico
- Municipality: Adjuntas

Area
  - Total: 3.67 sq mi (9.5 km^{2})
  - Land: 3.66 sq mi (9.5 km^{2})
  - Water: 0.01 sq mi (0.026 km^{2})
- Elevation: 1,942 ft (592 m)

Population (2010)
  - Total: 1,054
  - Density: 288.8/sq mi (111.5/km^{2})
- Source: 2010 Census
- Time zone: UTC−4 (AST)
- ZIP Codes: 00601, 00631
- Area code: 787/939
- Website: adjuntaspr.com

Capáez is a rural barrio in the municipality of Adjuntas, Puerto Rico. Its population in 2010 was 1,054.

== History ==
Capáez was in Spain's gazetteers since at least 1818 when the territorial boundaries of Adjuntas were first officially and administratively described, until Puerto Rico was ceded by Spain in the aftermath of the Spanish–American War under the terms of the Treaty of Paris of 1898 and became an unincorporated territory of the United States. In 1899, the United States Department of War conducted a census of Puerto Rico finding that the population of Capáez barrio was 1,266.

== Demographics ==
Historical population
Census	Pop.	Note	%±
1900	1,266		—
1910	1,241		−2.0%
1920	1,051		−15.3%
1930	1,112		5.8%
1940	1,235		11.1%
1950	1,081		−12.5%
1960	885		−18.1%
1970	800		−9.6%
1980	896		12.0%
1990	841		−6.1%
2000	1,010		20.1%
2010	1,054		4.4%
U.S. Decennial Census; 1899 (shown as 1900) 1910-1930; 1930-1950 1960 1980-2000 2010

== Landmarks and places of interest ==
- Capáez is home to some notable mountain peaks of the Cordillera Central such as Monte Hormiga (Spanish for 'ant mountain').
- Hacienda Monte Alto is an hacienda and coffee plantation dating to 1978.

== See also ==
- List of communities in Puerto Rico
