= Tanamá, Adjuntas, Puerto Rico =

Barrio in Puerto Rico

Tanamá
- Barrio
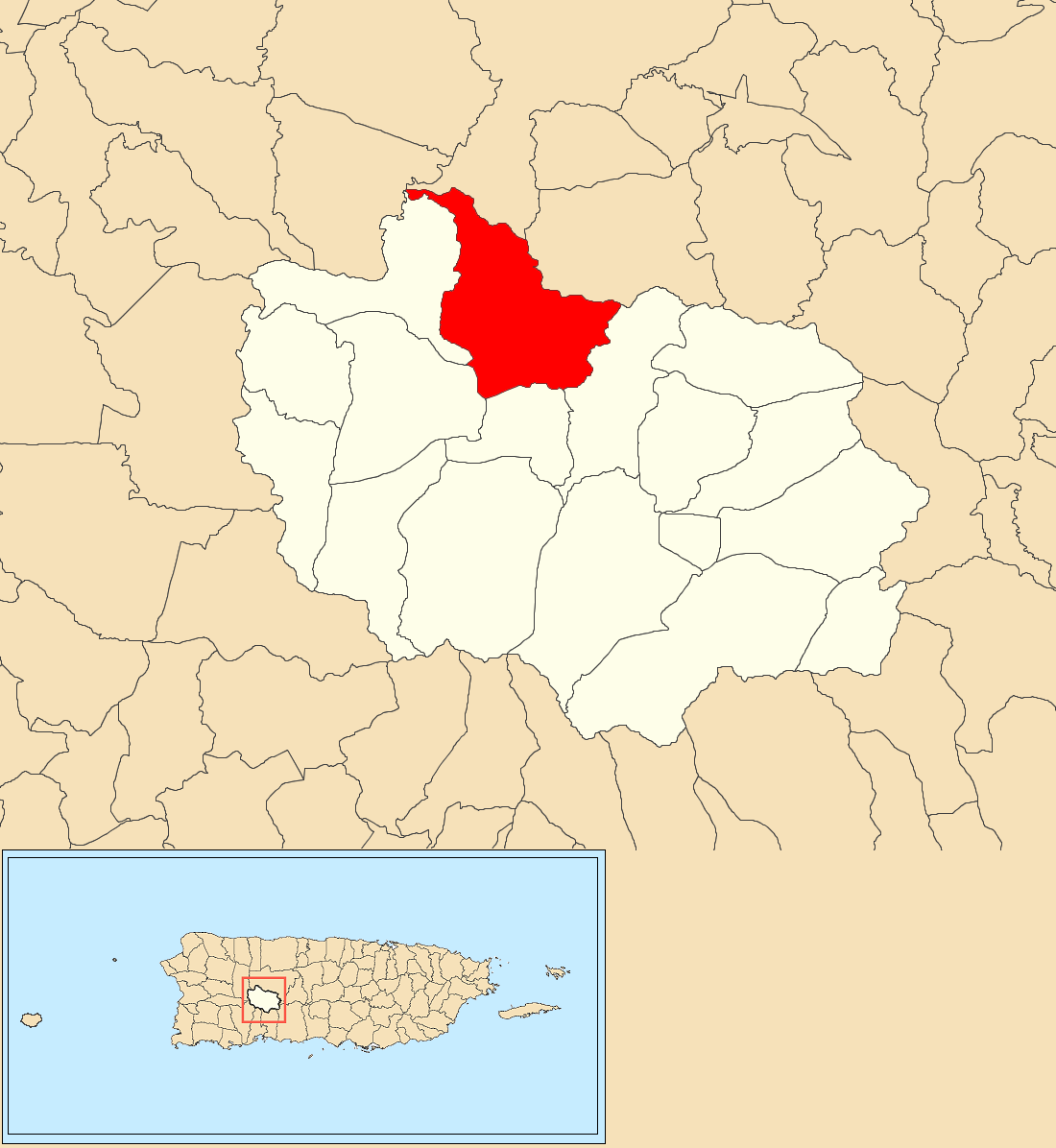
- Location of Tanamá barrio within the municipality of Adjuntas shown in red

- Location within the Caribbean
- Coordinates: 18°13′13″N 66°46′03″W
- Commonwealth: Puerto Rico
- Municipality: Adjuntas

Area
  - Total: 5.49 sq mi (14.2 km^{2})
  - Land: 5.49 sq mi (14.2 km^{2})
  - Water: 0 sq mi (0 km^{2})
- Elevation: 2,041 ft (622 m)

Population (2010)
  - Total: 1,193
  - Density: 216.9/sq mi (83.7/km^{2})
- Source: 2010 Census
- Time zone: UTC−4 (AST)
- Website: adjuntaspr.com

Tanamá is a rural barrio in the municipality of Adjuntas, Puerto Rico. Its population in 2010 was 1,193.

== History ==
Tanamá was in Spain's gazetteers until Puerto Rico was ceded by Spain in the aftermath of the Spanish–American War under the terms of the Treaty of Paris of 1898 and became an unincorporated territory of the United States. In 1899, the United States Department of War conducted a census of Puerto Rico finding that the population of Tanamá barrio was 752.

Historical population
Census	Pop.	Note	%±
1900	752		—
1910	620		−17.6%
1920	754		21.6%
1930	577		−23.5%
1940	774		34.1%
1950	1,094		41.3%
1960	1,277		16.7%
1970	1,199		−6.1%
1980	1,036		−13.6%
1990	895		−13.6%
2000	897		0.2%
2010	1,193		33.0%
U.S. Decennial Census; 1899 (shown as 1900) 1910-1930; 1930-1950 1960 1980-2000 2010

== Special Community ==
Since 2001 when law 1-2001 was passed, measures have been taken to identify and address the high levels of poverty and the lack of resources and opportunities affecting specific communities in Puerto Rico. Initially there were 686 places that made the list. By 2008, there were 742 places on the list of Comunidades especiales de Puerto Rico. The places on the list are barrios, communities, sectors, or neighborhoods and Tanamá was one of the seven areas in Adjuntas that made the list of Special Community.

== See also ==
- List of communities in Puerto Rico
