= Pellejas, Adjuntas, Puerto Rico =

Barrio in Puerto Rico

Pellejas
- Barrio
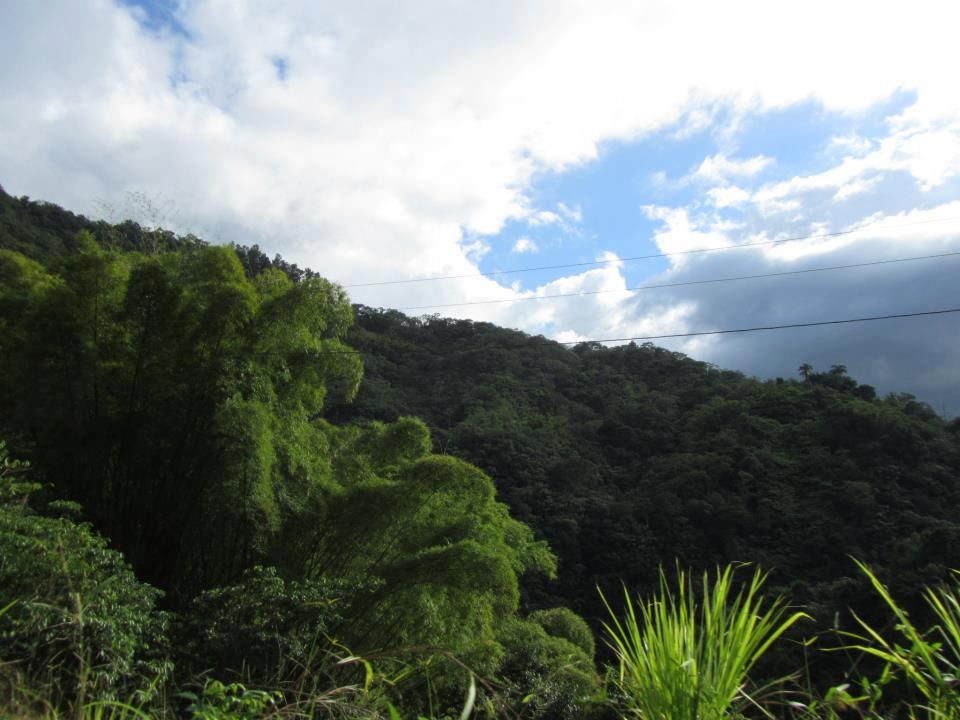
- Mountains in Pellejas

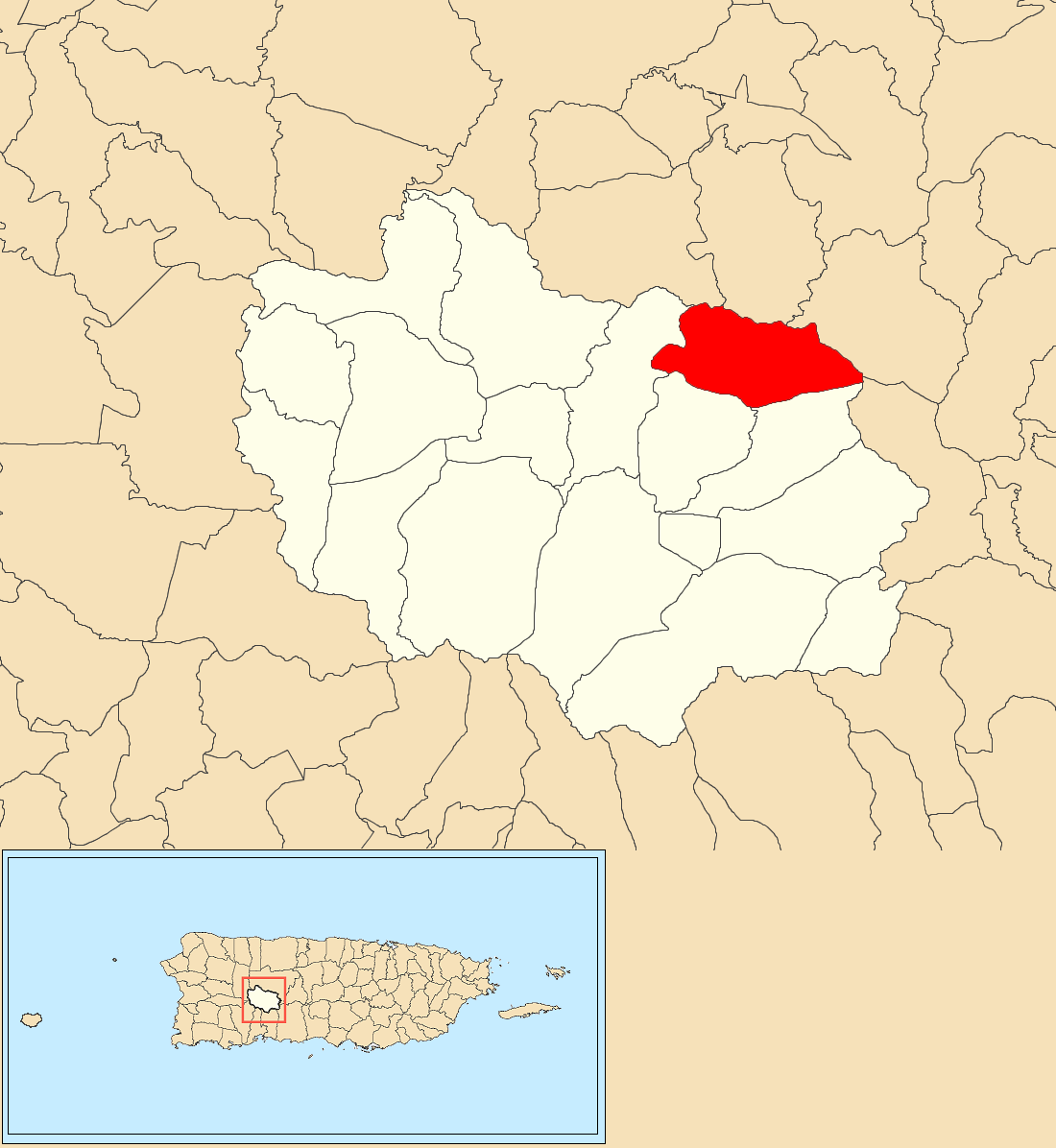
- Location of Pellejas barrio within the municipality of Adjuntas shown in red

- Location within the Caribbean
- Coordinates: 18°12′44″N 66°42′34″W
- Commonwealth: Puerto Rico
- Municipality: Adjuntas

Area
  - Total: 3.53 sq mi (9.1 km^{2})
  - Land: 3.52 sq mi (9.1 km^{2})
  - Water: 0.01 sq mi (0.026 km^{2})
- Elevation: 1,302 ft (397 m)

Population (2010)
  - Total: 553
  - Density: 157.1/sq mi (60.7/km^{2})
- Source: 2010 Census
- Time zone: UTC−4 (AST)

Pellejas is a rural barrio in the municipality of Adjuntas, Puerto Rico. Its population in 2010 was 553.

== History ==
Pellejas was in Spain's gazetteers until Puerto Rico was ceded by Spain in the aftermath of the Spanish–American War under the terms of the Treaty of Paris of 1898 and became an unincorporated territory of the United States. In 1899, the United States Department of War conducted a census of Puerto Rico finding that the population of Pellejas barrio was 1,521.

Historical population
| Census | Pop. | Note | %± |
|---|---|---|---|
| 1900 | 1,521 | | — |
| 1910 | 1,269 | | −16.6% |
| 1920 | 1,255 | | −1.1% |
| 1930 | 1,303 | | 3.8% |
| 1940 | 1,559 | | 19.6% |
| 1950 | 1,287 | | −17.4% |
| 1960 | 731 | | −43.2% |
| 1970 | 642 | | −12.2% |
| 1980 | 692 | | 7.8% |
| 1990 | 729 | | 5.3% |
| 2000 | 670 | | −8.1% |
| 2010 | 553 | | −17.5% |
U.S. Decennial Census; 1899 (shown as 1900) 1910-1930; 1930-1950 1960 1980-2000 2010

== See also ==
- List of communities in Puerto Rico
