= Cross fleury =

Heraldic charge

A cross fleury

A cross fleury (or flory) is a cross adorned at the ends with flowers in heraldry. It generally contains the fleur-de-lis, trefoils, etc. Synonyms or minor variants include fleuretty, fleuronny, floriated and flourished.

In early armory, it is not consistently distinguished from the cross patonce.

== See also ==
- Charge (heraldry)
- Cross
