= Puerto Rico Highway 135 =

Highway in Puerto Rico

Highway 135
- Ruta 135

Route information
- Maintained by Puerto Rico DTPW
- Length: 22.5 km (14.0 mi)
- Existed: 1953–present

Major junctions
- West end: PR-128 in Bartolo
- PR-4428 in Bartolo; PR-399 in Bartolo; PR-374 in Bartolo; PR-525 in Guayo; PR-529 in Limaní–Yahuecas–Guayo; PR-548 in Yahuecas; PR-129 in Yahuecas; PR-131 in Yayales; PR-526 in Capáez–Yahuecas
- East end: PR-123 in Juan González

Location
- Country: United States
- Territory: Puerto Rico
- Municipalities: Lares, Adjuntas

Highway system
- Roads in Puerto Rico; List
| ← PR-134 | → PR-136 |

Puerto Rico Highway 135 (PR-135) is a rural road that travels from Adjuntas, Puerto Rico to Lares. This highway begins at PR-123 north of downtown Adjuntas and ends at PR-128 in Bartolo.

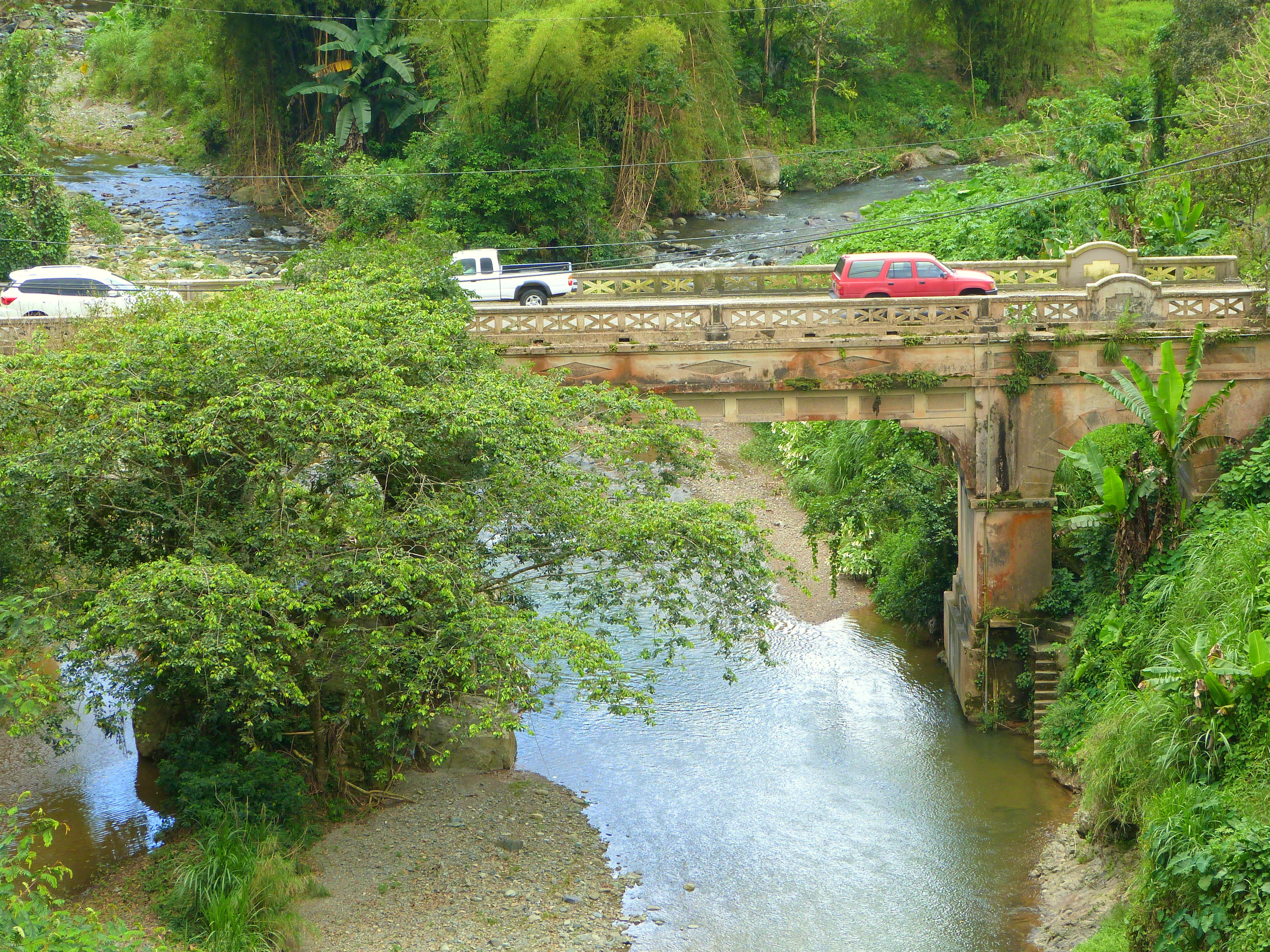
Las Cabañas Bridge in 2017

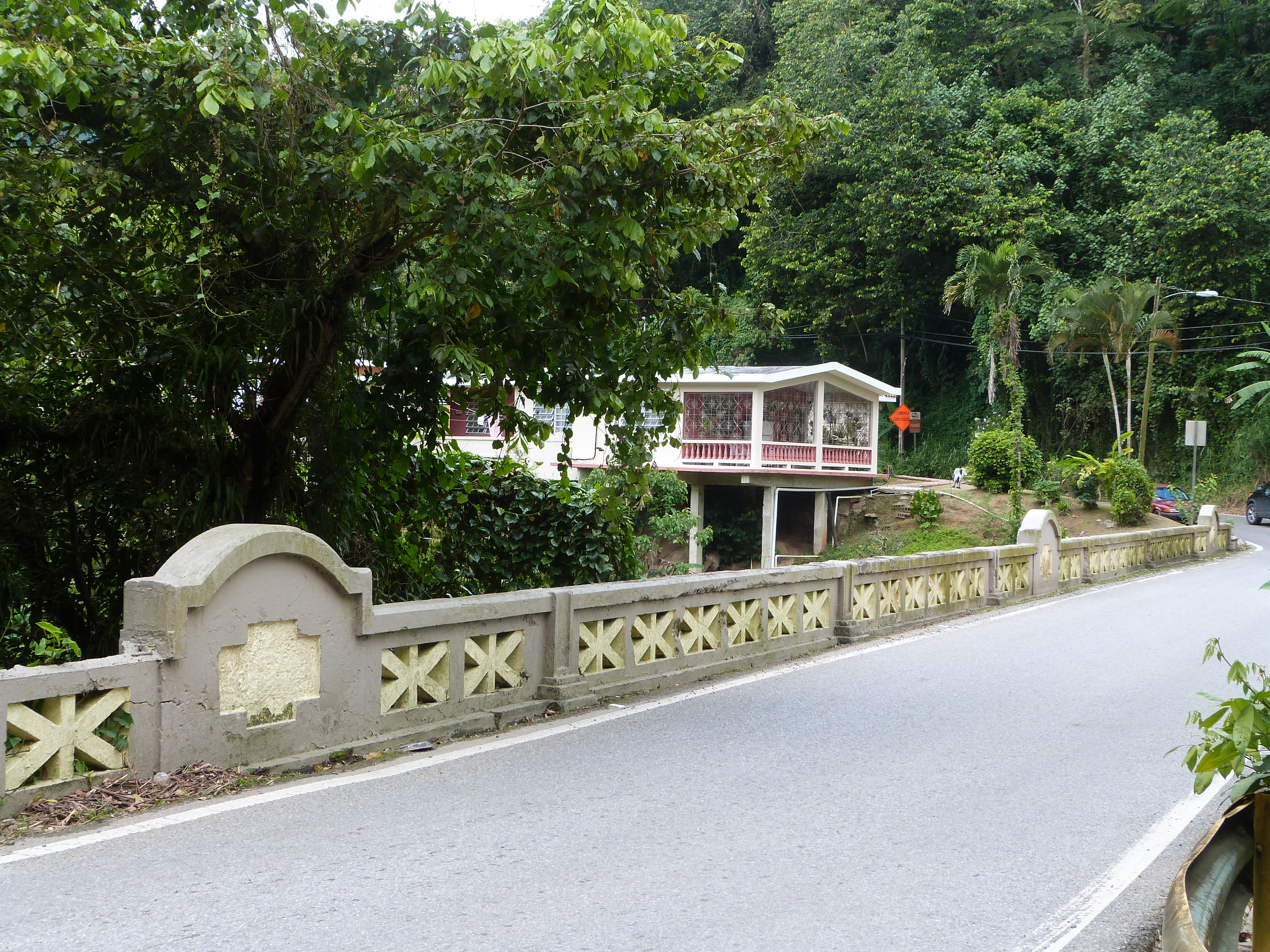
Las Cabañas Bridge

== Major intersections ==
| Municipality | Location | km | mi | Destinations | Notes |
|---|---|---|---|---|---|
| Lares | Bartolo | 0.0 | 0.0 | PR-128 – Lares, Yauco | Western terminus of PR-135; western terminus of the Ruta Panorámica concurrency; the Ruta Panorámica continues toward Yauco |
| Lares | Bartolo | 3.3 | 2.1 | PR-4428 – Bartolo | |
| Lares | Bartolo | 4.5 | 2.8 | PR-399 – Bartolo | |
| Lares | Bartolo | 5.4 | 3.4 | PR-374 – Río Prieto | |
| Río Guayo | | 5.4 | 3.4 | Puente Sifonte | |
| Adjuntas | Guayo | 8.6 | 5.3 | PR-525 (Ruta Panorámica) – Limaní | Eastern terminus of the Ruta Panorámica concurrency; the Ruta Panorámica continues toward Adjuntas |
| Adjuntas | Limaní–Yahuecas– Guayo tripoint | 8.7 | 5.4 | PR-529 – Yahuecas | |
| Adjuntas | Yahuecas | 12.7 | 7.9 | PR-548 – Guayabo Dulce | |
| Adjuntas | Yahuecas | 13.1 | 8.1 | PR-129 north – Lares | |
| Adjuntas | Yayales | 17.9 | 11.1 | PR-131 – Guilarte | |
| Adjuntas | Capáez–Yahuecas line | 19.3 | 12.0 | PR-526 – Capáez | |
| Adjuntas | Río Grande de Arecibo | 22.4– 22.5 | 13.9– 14.0 | Puente de las Cabañas | |
| Adjuntas | Juan González | 22.5 | 14.0 | PR-123 – Adjuntas, Utuado | Eastern terminus of PR-135 |
1.000 mi = 1.609 km; 1.000 km = 0.621 mi: Concurrency terminus

== See also ==
- 1953 Puerto Rico highway renumbering
