= Puerto Rico Highway 131 =

Highway in Puerto Rico

Highway 131
- Ruta 131

Route information
- Maintained by Puerto Rico DTPW
- Length: 8.0 km (5.0 mi)
- Existed: 1953–present

Major junctions
- South end: Guilarte Forest in Guilarte
- PR-518 in Guilarte; PR-525 in Guilarte
- North end: PR-135 in Yayales

Location
- Country: United States
- Territory: Puerto Rico
- Municipalities: Adjuntas

Highway system
- Roads in Puerto Rico; List
← PR-130	→ PR-132
← PR-3116	PR-3131	→ PR-3132

Puerto Rico Highway 131 (PR-131) is a road located in Adjuntas, Puerto Rico. It begins at its intersection with PR-135 in Barrio Yayales and ends at Guilarte Forest near Peñuelas municipal limit. Its segment between PR-525 and PR-518 is part of the Ruta Panorámica.

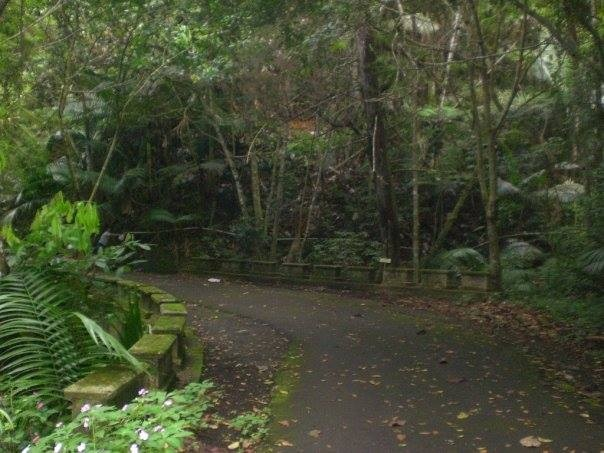
Puerto Rico Highway 131 in the Guilarte State Forest, looking south

== Major intersections ==
The entire route is located in Adjuntas.

Location	km	mi	Destinations	Notes
Guilarte	8.0	5.0	Southern terminus of PR-131 at Guilarte Forest; dead end road	
Guilarte	7.9	4.9	PR-518 east (Ruta Panorámica) – Adjuntas	Southern terminus of the Ruta Panorámica concurrency
Guilarte	4.1	2.5	PR-525 west (Ruta Panorámica) – Lares	Northern terminus of the Ruta Panorámica concurrency
Yayales	0.0	0.0	PR-135 (Carretera Francisco L. Báez Cruz) – Adjuntas, Lares	Northern terminus of PR-131
1.000 mi = 1.609 km; 1.000 km = 0.621 mi: Concurrency terminus

== Related route ==
Highway 3131
- Location: Guayanilla – Peñuelas
- Length: 5.3 km (3.3 mi)

Puerto Rico Highway 3131 (PR-3131) is a rural road that branches off from PR-132 in eastern Guayanilla and ends near Sector Malpaso in Peñuelas.

Municipality	Location	km	mi	Destinations	Notes
Guayanilla	Barrero	0.0	0.0	PR-132 (Carretera Juan C. Torres Irizarry) – Guayanilla, Peñuelas	Southern terminus of PR-3131
Peñuelas	Santo Domingo	5.3	3.3	Northern terminus of PR-3131 at Sector Malpaso	
1.000 mi = 1.609 km; 1.000 km = 0.621 mi

== See also ==
- 1953 Puerto Rico highway renumbering
