= Guayabo Dulce, Adjuntas, Puerto Rico =

Barrio in Puerto Rico

Guayabo Dulce
- Barrio
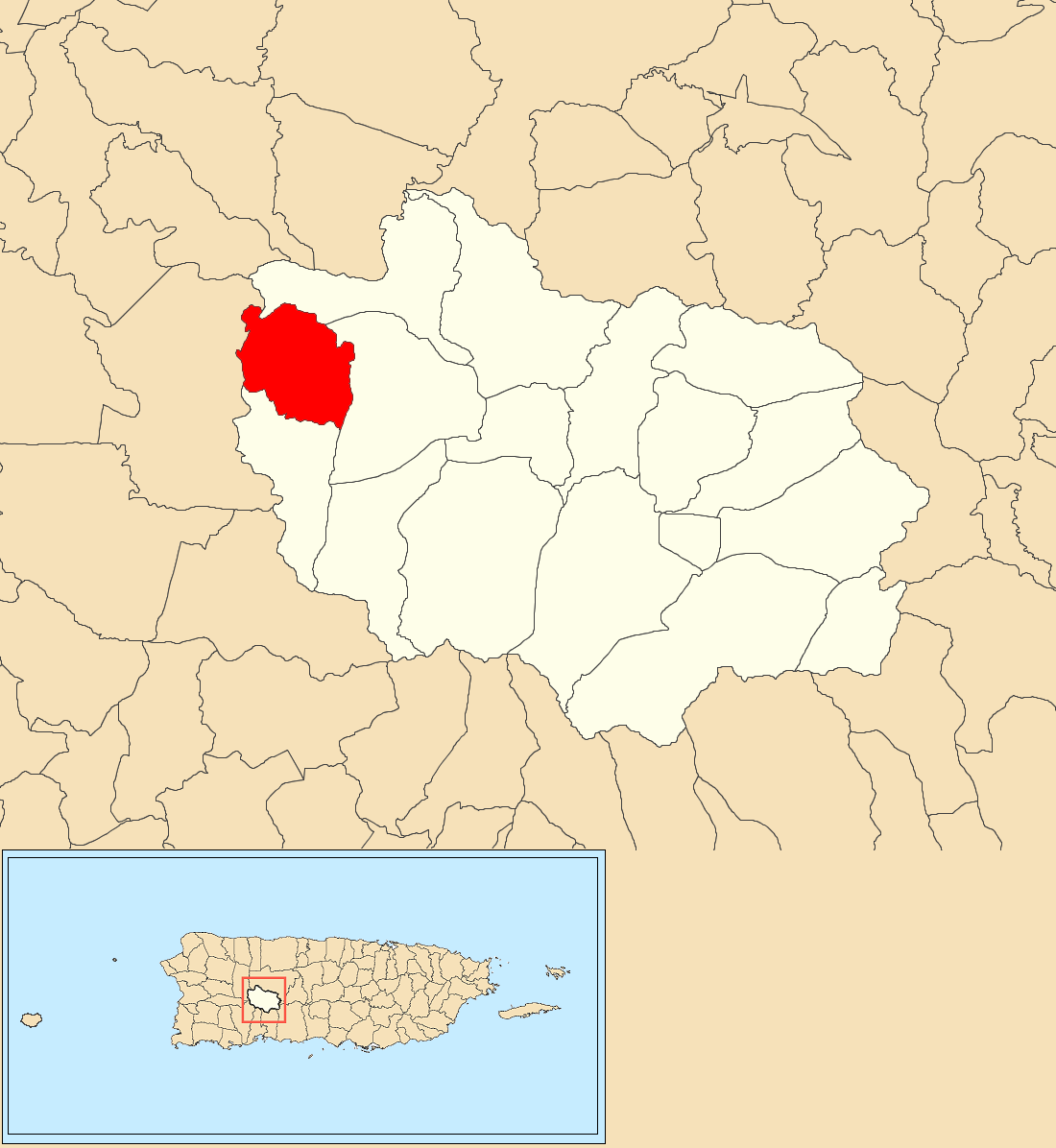
- Location of Guayabo Dulce barrio within the municipality of Adjuntas shown in red

- Location of Puerto Rico
- Coordinates: 18°12′23″N 66°49′32″W
- Commonwealth: Puerto Rico
- Municipality: Adjuntas

Area
  - Total: 2.82 sq mi (7.3 km^{2})
  - Land: 2.69 sq mi (7.0 km^{2})
  - Water: 0.13 sq mi (0.34 km^{2})
- Elevation: 2,342 ft (714 m)

Population (2010)
  - Total: 140
- Source: 2010 Census
- Time zone: UTC−4 (AST)
- ZIP Codes: 00601, 00631
- Area code: 787/939
- Website: adjuntaspr.com

Guayabo Dulce is a rural barrio in the municipality of Adjuntas, Puerto Rico. Its population in 2010 was 140.

== History ==
Guayabo Dulce (Spanish for 'sweet guava tree') was created as a distinct barrio within the municipality of Adjuntas in 1883, along with Yayales, Limaní, Guayo, Tanamá and Guilarte.

== Demographics ==
Guayabo Dulce was in Spain's gazetteers until Puerto Rico was ceded by Spain in the aftermath of the Spanish–American War under the terms of the Treaty of Paris of 1898 and became an unincorporated territory of the United States. In 1899, the United States Department of War conducted a census of Puerto Rico finding that the population of Guayabo Dulce barrio was 1,055.

Historical population
Census	Pop.	Note	%±
1900	1,055		—
1910	899		−14.8%
1920	1,120		24.6%
1930	1,100		−1.8%
1940	1,119		1.7%
1950	497		−55.6%
1960	553		11.3%
1970	204		−63.1%
1980	140		−31.4%
1990	136		−2.9%
2000	101		−25.7%
2010	140		38.6%
U.S. Decennial Census; 1899 (shown as 1900) 1910-1930; 1930-1950 1960 1980-2000 2010

== Landmarks and places of interest ==
- A small portion of Bosque del Pueblo, one of the 21 units of the Puerto Rico state forest system, is located within the barrio.

== See also ==
- List of communities in Puerto Rico
