= Puerto Rico Highway 525 =

Highway in Puerto Rico

Highway 525
- Ruta 525

Route information
- Maintained by Puerto Rico DTPW
- Length: 5.8 km (3.6 mi)
- Existed: 1953–present

Major junctions
- West end: PR-135 in Guayo
- PR-5525 in Limaní
- East end: PR-131 in Guilarte

Location
- Country: United States
- Territory: Puerto Rico
- Municipalities: Adjuntas

Highway system
- Roads in Puerto Rico; List
← PR-518	→ PR-538
← PR-5510	PR-5525	→ PR-5538

Puerto Rico Highway 525 (PR-525) is a rural road located entirely in the municipality of Adjuntas, Puerto Rico. With a length of 5.8 kilometers (3.6 mi), it begins at its intersection with PR-135 in Guayo barrio and ends at its junction with PR-131 in Guilarte barrio.

== Major intersections ==
The entire route is located in Adjuntas.

Location	km	mi	Destinations	Notes
Guayo	0.0	0.0	PR-135 – Lares, Yauco	Western terminus of PR-525; the Ruta Panorámica continues toward Lares
Limaní	0.7	0.43	PR-5525 – Limaní	
Guilarte	5.8	3.6	PR-131 – Adjuntas, Guilarte	Eastern terminus of PR-525; the Ruta Panorámica continues toward Adjuntas
1.000 mi = 1.609 km; 1.000 km = 0.621 mi

== Related route ==
Highway 5525
- Location: Adjuntas
- Length: 1.1 km (0.68 mi)

Puerto Rico Highway 5525 (PR-5525) is a north–south road that branches off from PR-525 in Limaní barrio. The entire route is located in Limaní, Adjuntas.

km	mi	Destinations	Notes
1.1	0.68	Southern terminus of PR-5525	
0.0	0.0	PR-525 (Ruta Panorámica) – Adjuntas, Lares	Northern terminus of PR-5525
1.000 mi = 1.609 km; 1.000 km = 0.621 mi

== See also ==
- 1953 Puerto Rico highway renumbering
