= Guayo, Adjuntas, Puerto Rico =

Barrio in Puerto Rico

Guayo
- Barrio
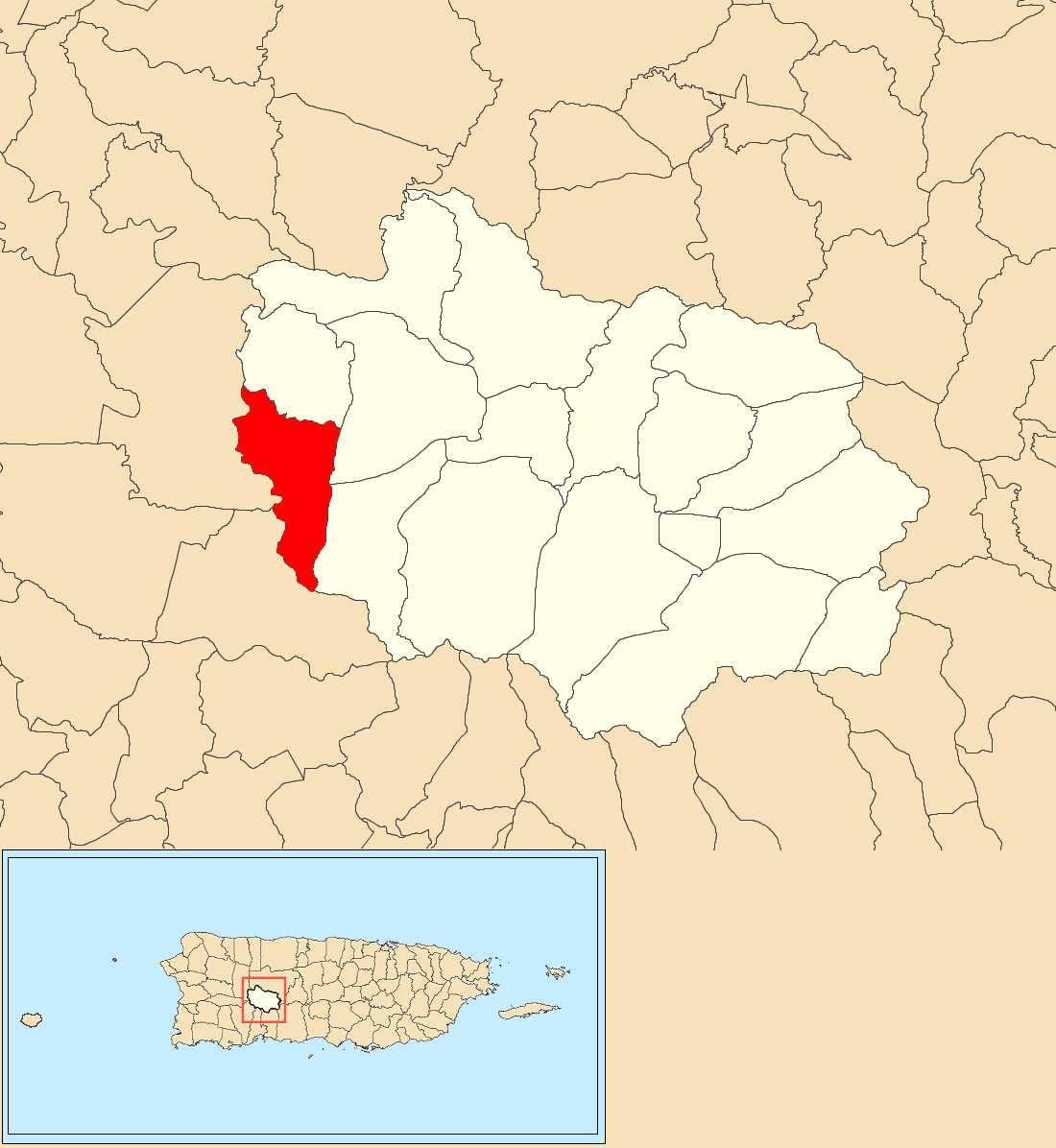
- Location of Guayo barrio within the municipality of Adjuntas shown in red

- Location of Puerto Rico
- Coordinates: 18°10′43″N 66°49′18″W
- Commonwealth: Puerto Rico
- Municipality: Adjuntas

Area
  - Total: 2.97 sq mi (7.7 km^{2})
  - Land: 2.87 sq mi (7.4 km^{2})
  - Water: 0.1 sq mi (0.26 km^{2})
- Elevation: 1,709 ft (521 m)

Population (2010)
  - Total: 853
  - Density: 297.2/sq mi (114.7/km^{2})
- Source: 2010 Census
- Time zone: UTC−4 (AST)
- ZIP Codes: 00601, 00631
- Area code: 787/939
- Website: adjuntaspr.com

Guayo is a rural barrio in the municipality of Adjuntas, Puerto Rico.

== History ==
Guayo (Spanish for 'grater', named after the Guayo River) was created as a distinct barrio within the municipality of Adjuntas in 1883, along with Yayales, Limaní, Guayabo Dulce, Tanamá and Guilarte. The development of the barrio itself is closely linked to the historical development of the nearby settlement of Castañer, today within the municipality of Lares, and to the establishment of the Guayo Lake, important for the local agricultural industry, particularly coffee growth.

== Demographics ==
Guayo was in Spain's gazetteers until Puerto Rico was ceded by Spain in the aftermath of the Spanish–American War under the terms of the Treaty of Paris of 1898 and became an unincorporated territory of the United States. In 1899, the United States Department of War conducted a census of Puerto Rico finding that the combined population of Guayo barrio and Vega Abajo barrio was 1,275.

Historical population
Census	Pop.	Note	%±
1910	639		—
1920	485		−24.1%
1930	504		3.9%
1940	872		73.0%
1950	1,272		45.9%
1960	918		−27.8%
1970	992		8.1%
1980	979		−1.3%
1990	890		−9.1%
2000	886		−0.4%
2010	853		−3.7%
U.S. Decennial Census; 1900 (N/A) 1910-1930; 1930-1950 1960 1980-2000 2010

=== Special Community ===
Since 2001 when law 1-2001 was passed, measures have been taken to identify and address the high levels of poverty and the lack of resources and opportunities affecting specific communities in Puerto Rico. Initially there were 686 places that made the list. By 2008, there were 742 places on the list of Comunidades especiales de Puerto Rico. The places on the list are barrios, communities, sectors, or neighborhoods and Guayo was one of the seven areas in Adjuntas which made the list.

== Landmarks and places of interest ==
- Guayo Lake, shared with the municipality of Lares, is a reservoir established in 1957 by the damming of the Guayo River.

== See also ==
- List of communities in Puerto Rico
