= Puerto Rico Highway 518 =

Highway in Puerto Rico

Highway 518
- Ruta 518

Route information
- Maintained by Puerto Rico DTPW
- Length: 12.1 km (7.5 mi)
- Existed: 1953–present

Major junctions
- West end: PR-131 in Guilarte
- PR-522 in Garzas; PR-388 in Saltillo
- East end: PR-123 in Adjuntas barrio-pueblo

Location
- Country: United States
- Territory: Puerto Rico
- Municipalities: Adjuntas

Highway system
- Roads in Puerto Rico; List
← PR-516	→ PR-525

Puerto Rico Highway 518 (PR-518) is a rural road located entirely in the municipality of Adjuntas, Puerto Rico. With a length of 12.1 kilometers (7.5 mi), it begins at its intersection with PR-123 in downtown Adjuntas and ends at its junction with PR-131 in Guilarte barrio.

== Major intersections ==
The entire route is located in Adjuntas.

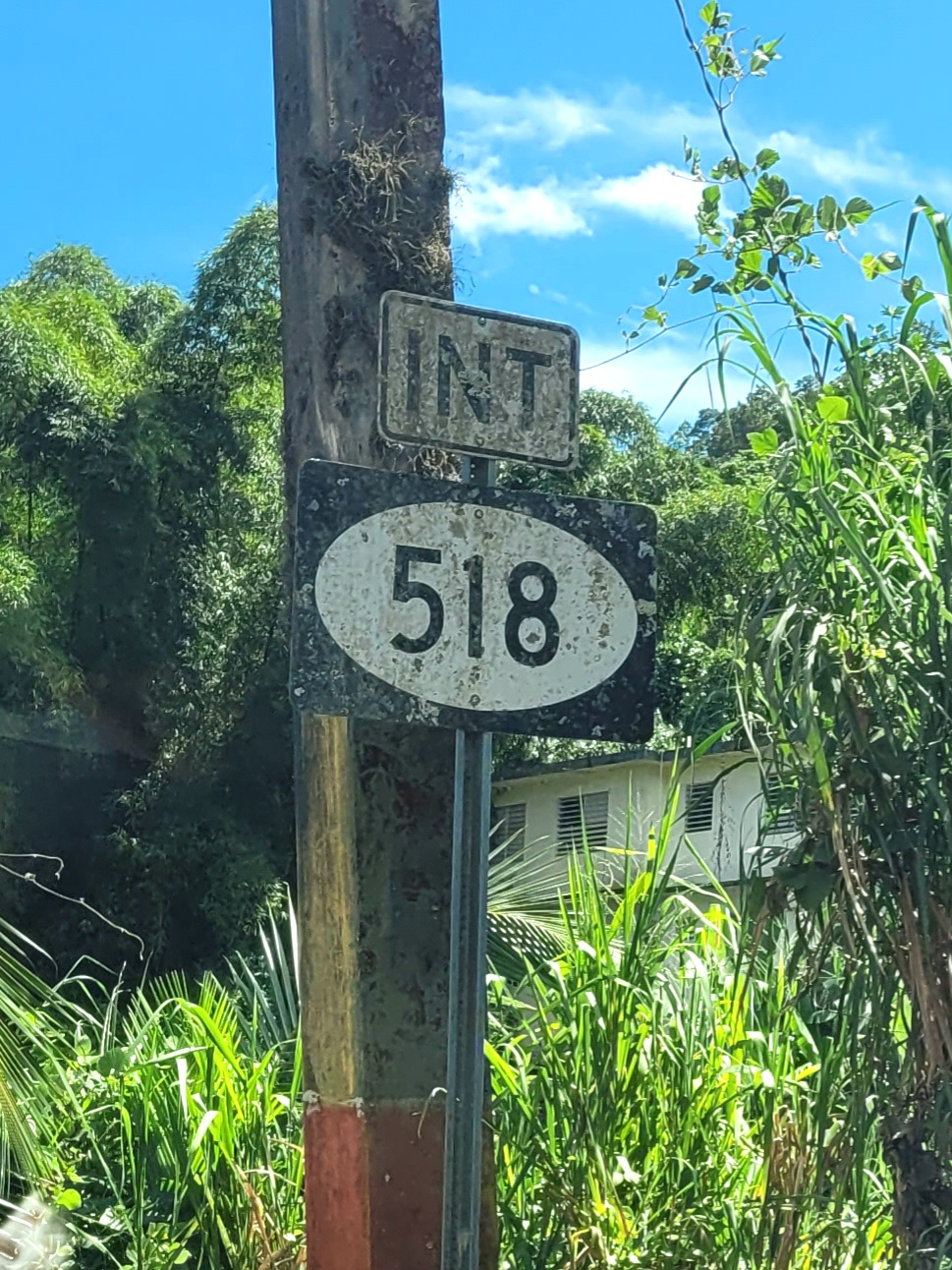
PR-123 south near PR-518 intersection in downtown Adjuntas

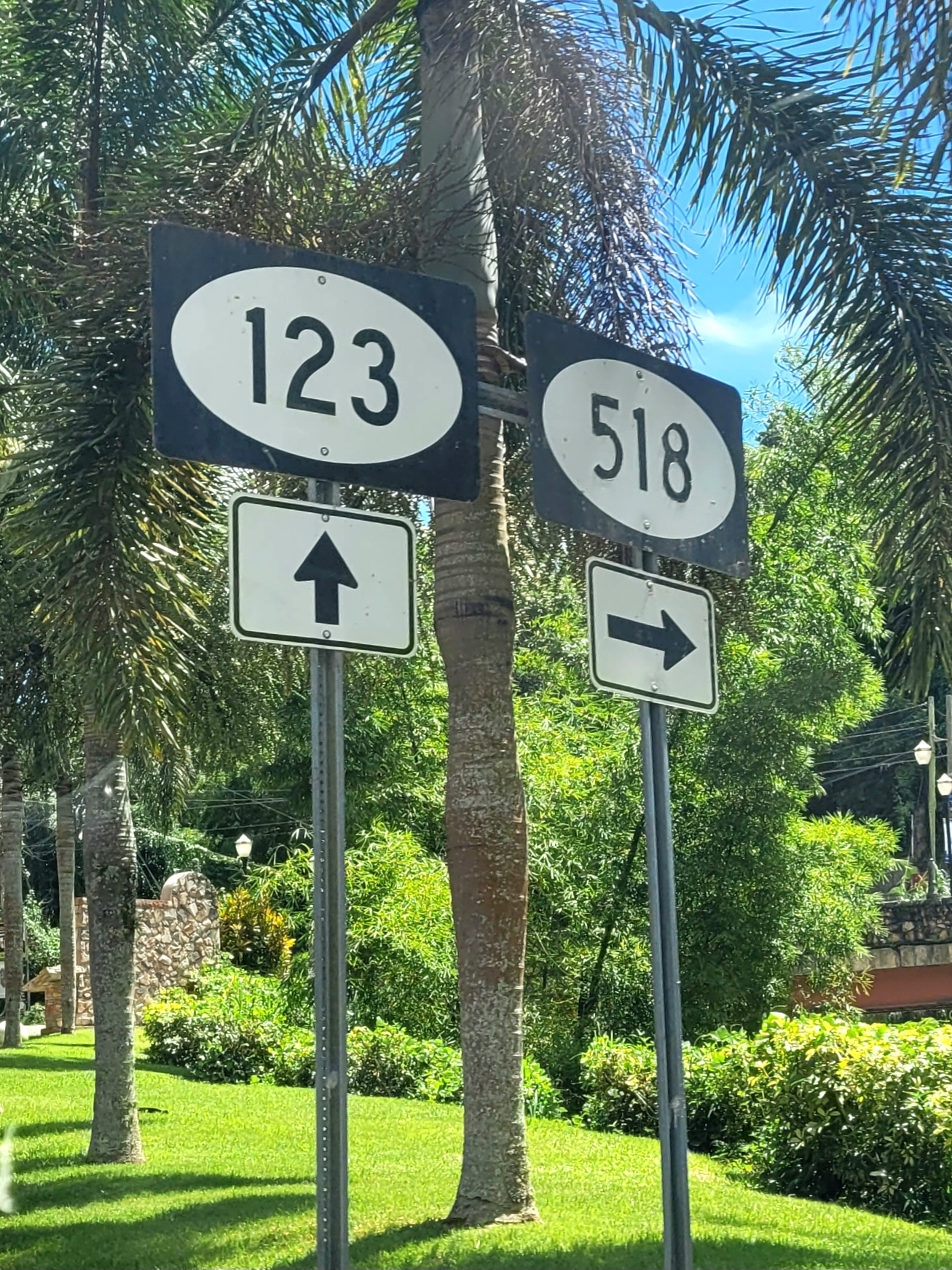
PR-123 south at PR-518 intersection in downtown Adjuntas

Location	km	mi	Destinations	Notes
Guilarte	12.1	7.5	PR-131 – Adjuntas, Lares	Western terminus of PR-518; the Ruta Panorámica continues toward Lares
Garzas	8.3	5.2	PR-522 – Garzas	
Saltillo	5.6	3.5	PR-388 – Peñuelas	
Adjuntas barrio-pueblo	0.0	0.0	PR-123 – Adjuntas, Ponce	Eastern terminus of PR-518; the Ruta Panorámica continues toward Utuado
1.000 mi = 1.609 km; 1.000 km = 0.621 mi

== See also ==
- List of highways numbered 518
