= Monte Guilarte =

Mountain in Puerto Rico

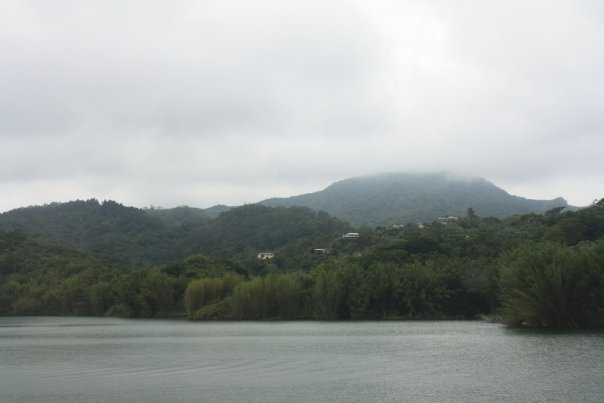
- Monte Guilarte with Garzas Lake in the foreground.

Highest point
- Elevation: 1,199 m (3,934 ft)
- Coordinates: 18°09′33″N 66°46′37″W

Geography
- Location within Puerto Rico
- Location: Adjuntas
- Parent range: Cordillera Central

Climbing
- Easiest route: Hike

Monte Guilarte, also known as Monte del Guaraguao, is the fifth-highest peak in Puerto Rico at 1,199 meters (3,934 ft) above sea level. The mountain is located in the Cordillera Central, in the municipality of Adjuntas.

It is so named after Captain Juan Guilarte de Salazar, a Spanish explorer and Conquistador, who was one of the first settlers of Puerto Rico. In 1513, Guilarte de Salazar led a column of 50 men to victory against 600 Taíno Indians in the southwest of the island.

The mountain and its surroundings encompasses the Guilarte State Forest, located in Guilarte, Adjuntas, Puerto Rico.

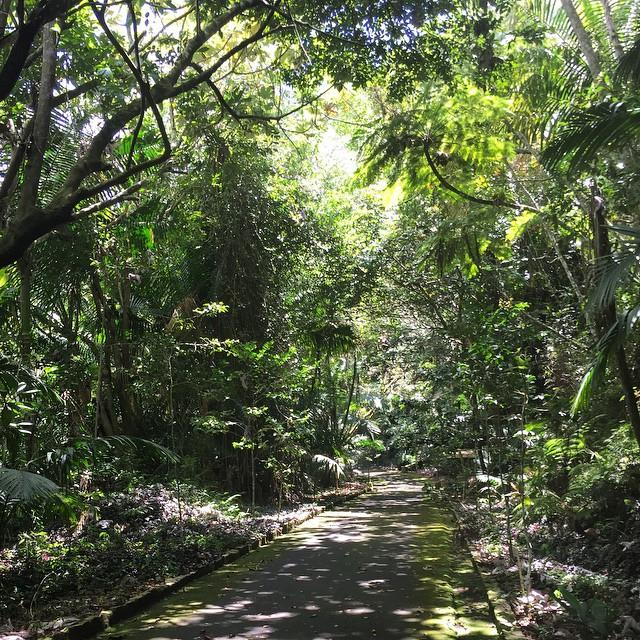
Guilarte State Forest
