= Bartolo, Lares, Puerto Rico =

Barrio of Puerto Rico

Bartolo
- Barrio
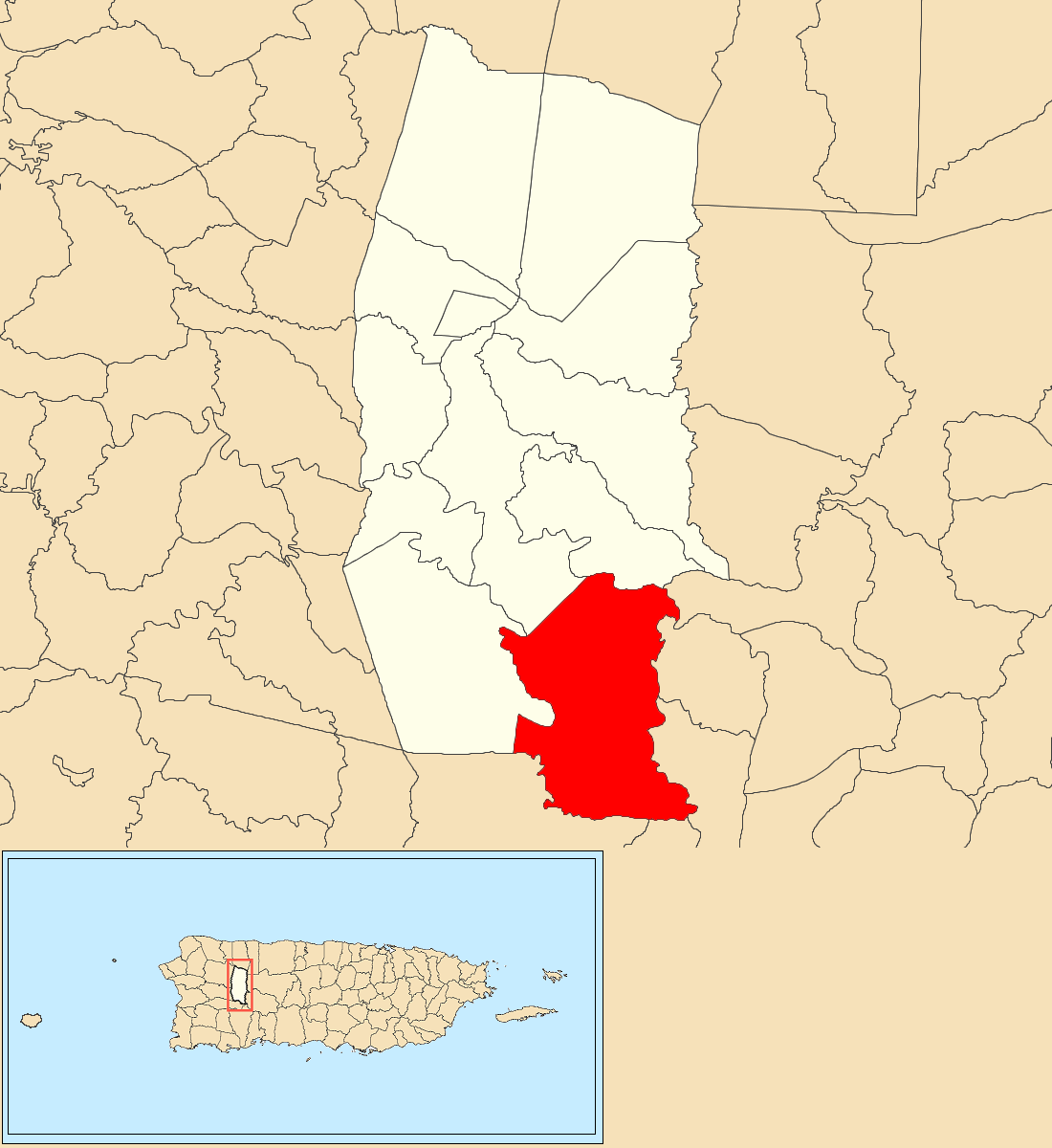
- Location of Bartolo barrio within the municipality of Lares shown in red

- Location of Puerto Rico
- Coordinates: 18°11′45″N 66°51′00″W
- Commonwealth: Puerto Rico
- Municipality: Lares

Area
  - Total: 8.44 sq mi (21.9 km^{2})
  - Land: 8.25 sq mi (21.4 km^{2})
  - Water: 0.19 sq mi (0.49 km^{2})
- Elevation: 1,818 ft (554 m)

Population (2010)
  - Total: 2,035
  - Density: 246.7/sq mi (95.3/km^{2})
- Source: 2010 Census
- Time zone: UTC−4 (AST)

Bartolo is a barrio in the municipality of Lares, Puerto Rico. Its population in 2010 was 2,035. Bartolo is in the southeast area of Lares.

== History ==
Bartolo was in Spain's gazetteers until Puerto Rico was ceded by Spain in the aftermath of the Spanish–American War under the terms of the Treaty of Paris of 1898 and became an unincorporated territory of the United States. In 1899, the United States Department of War conducted a census of Puerto Rico finding that the population of Bartolo barrio was 2,035.

Historical population
Census	Pop.	Note	%±
1900	2,035		—
1910	1,961		−3.6%
1920	2,117		8.0%
1930	2,409		13.8%
1940	2,484		3.1%
1950	2,951		18.8%
1960	2,854		−3.3%
1970	2,391		−16.2%
1980	2,483		3.8%
1990	2,311		−6.9%
2000	2,030		−12.2%
2010	2,035		0.2%
U.S. Decennial Census; 1899 (shown as 1900) 1910-1930; 1930-1950 1980-2000 2010

== Sectors ==
Barrios (which are, in contemporary times, roughly comparable to minor civil divisions) and subbarrios, in turn, are further subdivided into smaller locally populated place areas/units called sectores (sectors in English). The types of sectores may vary, from normal sector to urbanización to reparto to barriada to residencial, among others.

The following sectors are in Bartolo barrio:

Calle Cirila, Calle Cooperativismo, Calle Los Millonarios, Calle Paraíso, Carretera Los Romero, Carretera Vilella, Cerro Las Avispas, Condominio Alturas de Castañer, Poblado Castañer, Sector Calbache, Sector Grillasca, Sector Guano, Sector La Cuesta, Sector Rábanos, Sector Regino, Sector San Juan Bautista, Tramo Carretera 128, Tramo Carretera 135, and Tramo Carretera 431.

== Jíbaros Mutual Support Center ==
The Manuel Rojas Luzardo, a school that was built in 1922 was closed in 2015 by the Puerto Rico Department of Education. A group of residents, who farm the land (jíbaros), rehabilitated the school and put it to use, after they were left homeless when their homes were destroyed by Hurricane Maria in September 2017. The group received support from a number of businesses including a donation of solar panels. With their work, the once abandoned school is now called the Jíbaros Mutual Support Center (Spanish: Centro de Apoyo Mutuo Jíbaro), and the classrooms serve as residences to eleven families (to families with a woman head of household and the elderly). There are micro-businesses, including a theater, operating from the location. Members of the local Presbyterian church who spearheaded the grassroots movement for Bartolo are pursuing official ownership of the property. Similar Mutual Support Centers have popped up around the island.

== See also ==
- List of communities in Puerto Rico
- List of barrios and sectors of Lares, Puerto Rico
