= Garzas, Adjuntas, Puerto Rico =

Barrio in Puerto Rico

Garzas
- Barrio
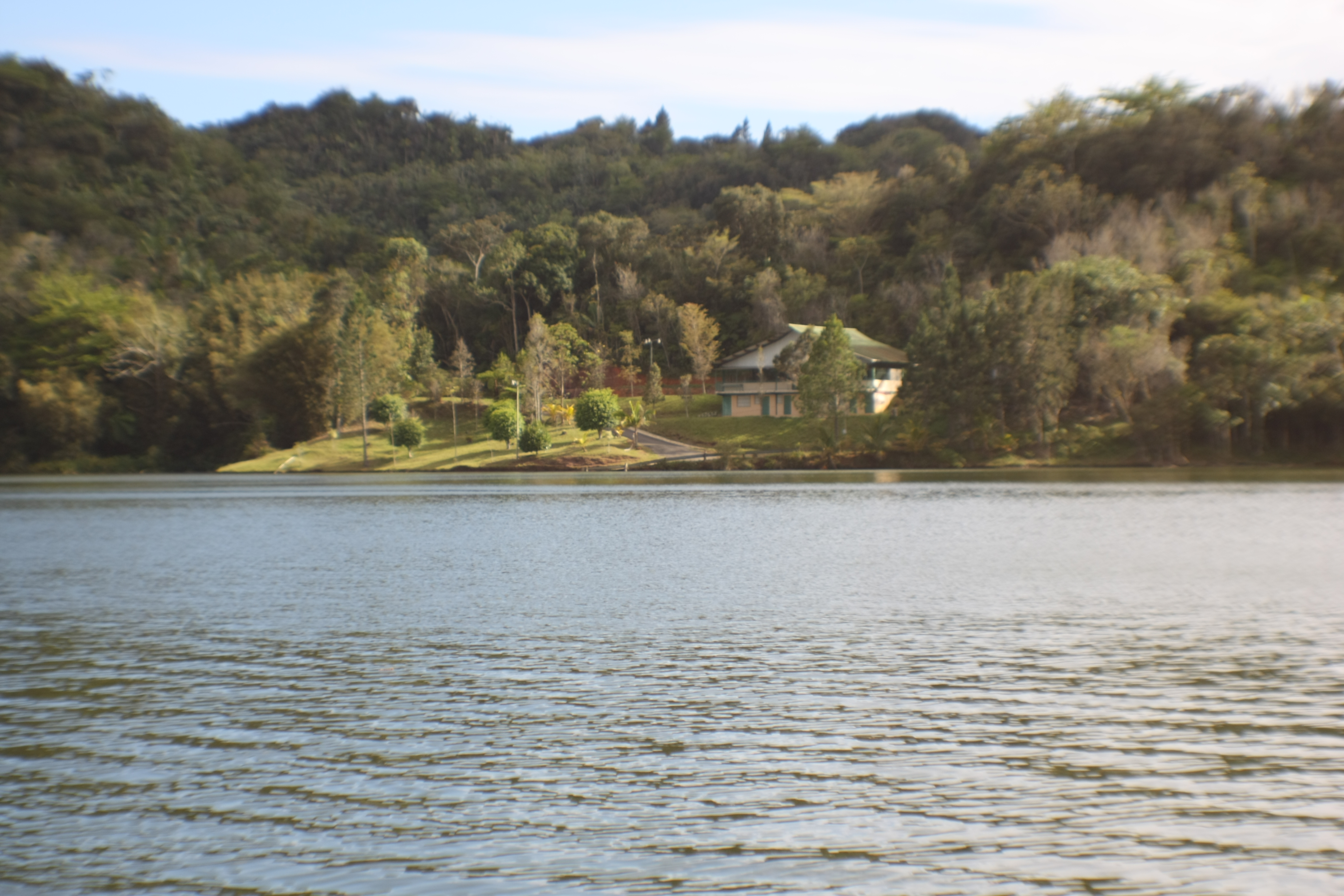
- Garzas Lake

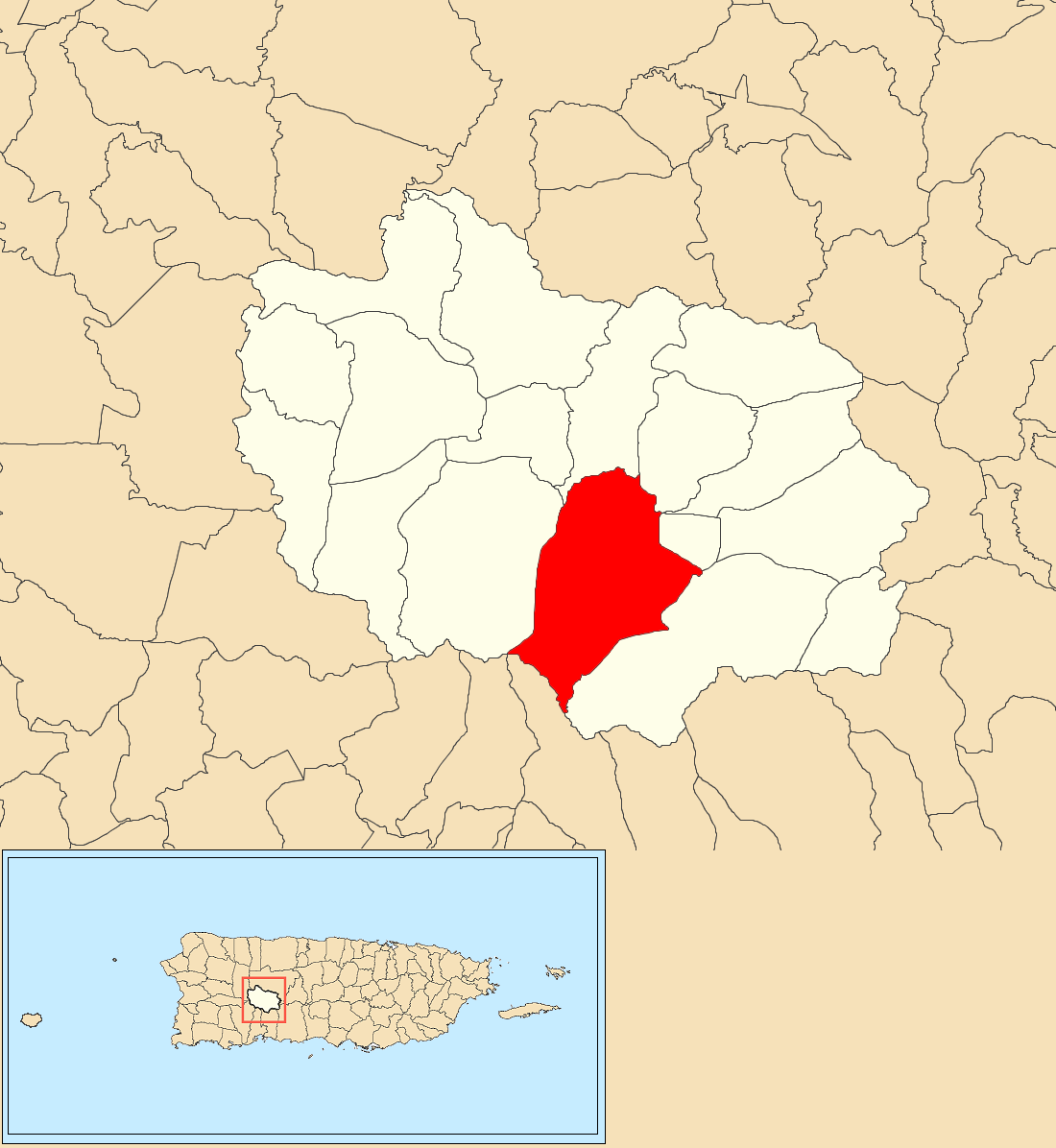
- Location of Garzas barrio within the municipality of Adjuntas shown in red

- Location of Puerto Rico
- Coordinates: 18°09′05″N 66°44′59″W
- Commonwealth: Puerto Rico
- Municipality: Adjuntas

Area
  - Total: 6.37 sq mi (16.5 km^{2})
  - Land: 6.28 sq mi (16.3 km^{2})
  - Water: 0.09 sq mi (0.23 km^{2})
- Elevation: 2,211 ft (674 m)

Population (2010)
  - Total: 1,337
  - Density: 212.9/sq mi (82.2/km^{2})
- Source: 2010 Census
- Time zone: UTC−4 (AST)
- ZIP Codes: 00601, 00631
- Area code: 787/939
- Website: adjuntaspr.com

Garzas is a rural barrio in the municipality of Adjuntas, Puerto Rico. Its population in 2010 was 1,337.

== History ==
Garzas (Spanish for 'herons') was one of the original six barrios of Adjuntas as evident in the 1818 administrative rural census. Its population grew in size, first due to the establishment of Citrus medica crops (locally known as cidra) during the end of the 19th century. Construction of a dam between 1936 and 1943 further developed the area as the establishment of the Garzas Lake solidified the infrastructure and fortified both the agricultural and recreational opportunities in the area.

== Demographics ==
Garzas was in Spain's gazetteers until Puerto Rico was ceded by Spain in the aftermath of the Spanish–American War under the terms of the Treaty of Paris of 1898 and became an unincorporated territory of the United States. In 1899, the United States Department of War conducted a census of Puerto Rico finding that the population of Garzas barrio was 1,425.

Historical population
Census	Pop.	Note	%±
1900	1,425		—
1910	1,204		−15.5%
1920	1,206		0.2%
1930	904		−25.0%
1940	1,173		29.8%
1950	1,632		39.1%
1960	1,298		−20.5%
1970	1,370		5.5%
1980	1,357		−0.9%
1990	1,317		−2.9%
2000	973		−26.1%
2010	1,337		37.4%
U.S. Decennial Census; 1899 (shown as 1900) 1910-1930; 1930-1950 1960 1980-2000 2010

== Landmarks and places of interest ==
- Hacienda Villa Sotomayor is a parador located along the Vacas River near its confluence with the Cidra River.
- Garzas Lake is a reservoir established in 1943 by the damming of the Vacas River. One of the highest reservoirs of its size in the island, it is popular for fishing and boating.
- Salto Ataúd (Spanish for 'coffin falls') is a tiered waterfall also located along the Vacas River, downstream from Garzas Lake. It is a popular site for swimming and is located at GPS coordinates 18.15385°N 66.74065°W, which can be accessed from PR-522. The area also contains other charcas (plunge pools) such as Las Losetas and Las Garzas.
- A portion of the Guilarte State Forest is also located within the boundaries of barrio Garzas.

== See also ==
- List of communities in Puerto Rico
