= Guilarte State Forest =

State forest in Puerto Rico

Guilarte State Forest Spanish: Bosque Estatal de Guilarte
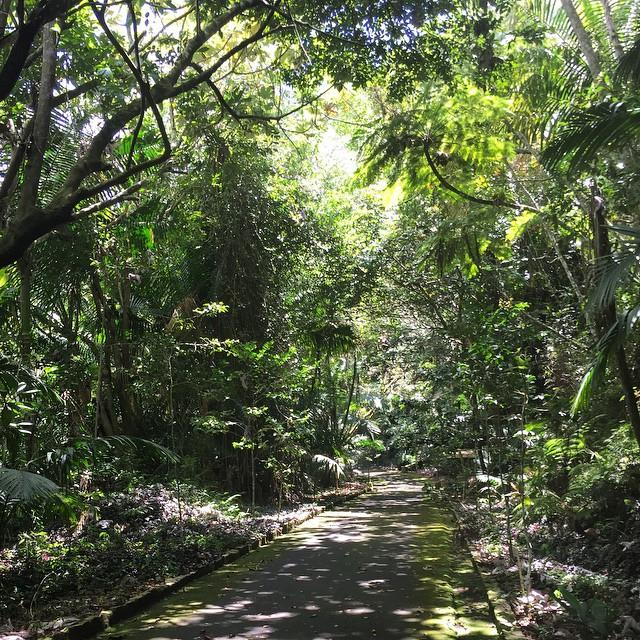
- Main visitors' entrance to the forest.

Map
- Interactive map of Guilarte State Forest

Geography
- Location: Adjuntas, Guayanilla, Peñuelas and Yauco
- Elevation: 3,950 feet (1,200 m)
- Area: 4,965 cuerdas (4,822 acres)

Administration
- Status: Public, Commonwealth
- Governing body: Puerto Rico Department of Natural and Environmental Resources (DRNA)
- Website: www.drna.gobierno.pr

Ecology
- WWF Classification: Puerto Rican moist forests

Guilarte State Forest (Spanish: Bosque Estatal de Guilarte) is one of the 20 forests that make up the public forests system in Puerto Rico. The forest is located in the eastern half of the Central Mountain Range or Cordillera Central. The main geographical feature of the forest reserve is Monte Guilarte, which is Puerto Rico's 7th highest mountain at 3,950 feet (1,204 m) above sea level. While Monte Guilarte is located in the municipality of Adjuntas, the forest's borders also include parts of Guayanilla, Peñuelas and Yauco.

== History ==
In 1935, the Puerto Rico Reconstruction Administration (Spanish: Administración de Reconstrucción de Puerto Rico) acquired 3,500 acres in and around Monte Guilarte in the municipality of Adjuntas with the goal of preserving the area as a forest reserve. The reserve was intended to be a wildlife preserve for the conservation of numerous plant and animal species found in the area but also for recreational purposes. Today the forest is managed by the Puerto Rico Department of Natural and Environmental Resources (DRNA), which has enlarged the protected area of the forest which now extends 4,822 acres.

== Ecology ==
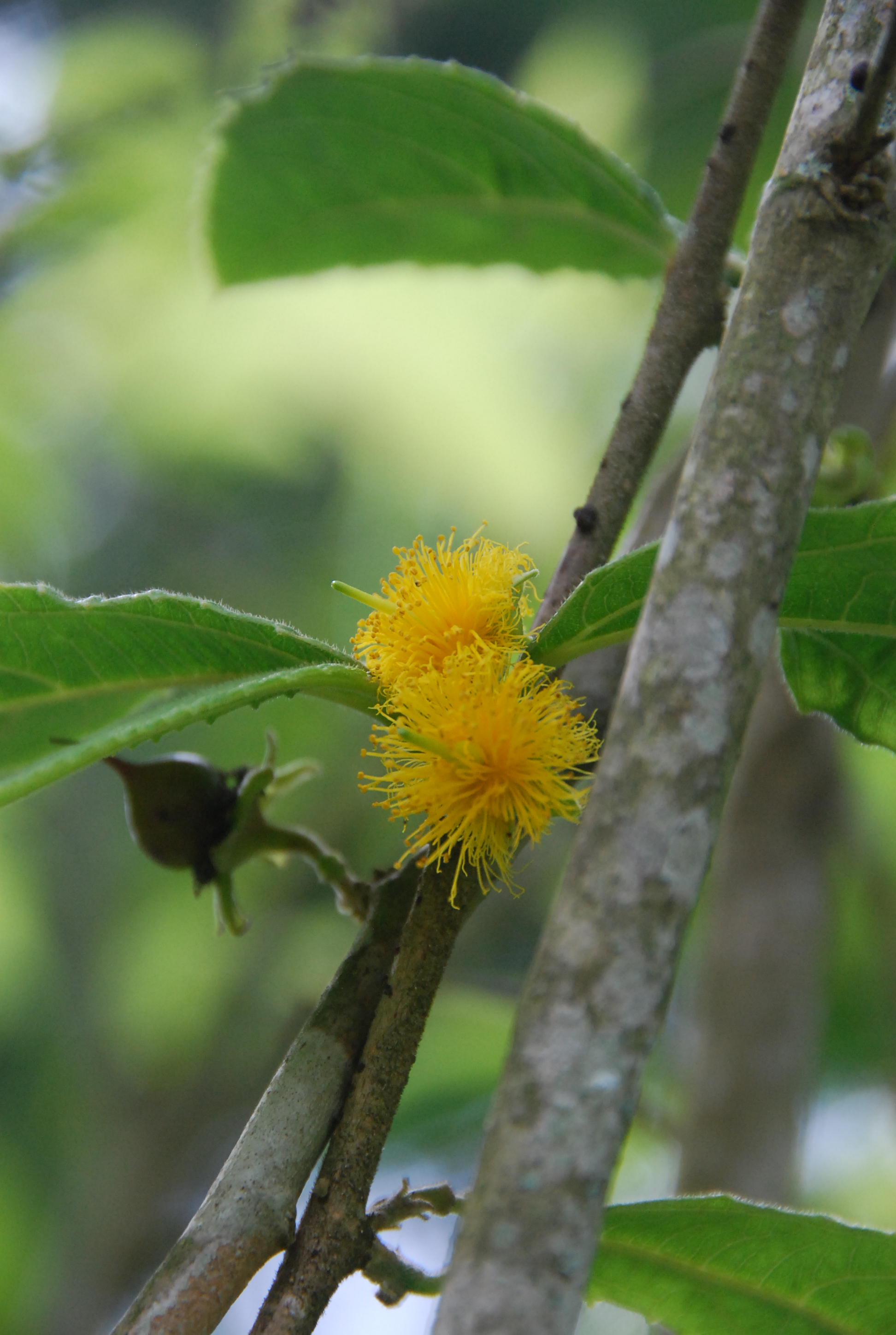
The Banara vanderbiltii or palo de Ramón tree is critically endangered with only 20 individuals found in the wild.

The forest has altitudes varying from 2,500 to 3,950 feet above sea level and it is divided into two forest zones: the subtropical moist broadleaf forest in the form of the Sierra palm tree forest and the montane rain forest found in the highest peaks of the forest. These preserved forests are very important for the protection of various hydrological basins such as those of the Arecibo River, the Añasco River and the Guayanilla River, all of which have their sources within the forest's boundaries.

=== Flora ===
The forest is home to approximately 227 species of trees of which 4 are endangered or threatened: the West Indian walnut (Juglans jamaicensis), the palo de Ramón tree (Banara vanderbiltii), the endemic dwarf tree fern (Alsophila dryopteroides) and the Monte Guilarte hollyfern (Polystichum calderonense). The latter is also endemic, highly endangered and can only be found in two locations in this forest.

The most common type of forest zone found in the reserve is the Sierra palm tree forest where the species of the same name is most numerous. In addition to this palm tree the forest is also home to other indicator species such as the caimitillo tree (Micropholis sp.) and the tabaiba tree (Sapium laurocerasum). Another notable tree species is the Puerto Rican magnolia or jagüilla (Magnolia portoricensis).

The montane forest, also referred to as the cloud forest, located in the highest parts of the forest is home to species such as the Tabebuia shumanniana and the Ocotea spatulata which are evergreen trees with small leaves often found in the highest parts of Puerto Rico. Other trees found in this area include the Spanish elm or capá prieto (Cordia alliodora) and the introduced yet naturalized swamp mahogany or swamp eucalyptus (Eucalyptus robusta), which are adapted to the cooler temperatures.

=== Fauna ===
The Guilarte Forest is one of the few protected areas in Puerto Rico that are home to numerous endangered or threatened animal species such as the red fruit bat (Stenoderma rufum), only found in Puerto Rico and the U.S. Virgin Islands, Eneida's coquí (Eleutherodactylus eneidae), the mountain coquí (Eleutherodactylus portoricensis), the Puerto Rican boa (Epicrates inornatus), the Puerto Rican vireo or bien-te-veo (Vireo latimeri), and the Puerto Rican sharp-shinned hawk or Sierra hawk (Accipiter striatus venator), a highly endangered subspecies of the sharp-shinned hawk.

Other animal species found in the forest are the scaly-naped pigeon (Patagioenas squamosa), the Puerto Rican emerald hummingbird (Riccordia maugeaus), the Puerto Rican tody or San Pedrito (Todus mexicanus), the Puerto Rican woodpecker (Melanerpes portoricensis), the Puerto Rican twig anole (Anolis occultus), the olive bush anole (Anolis krugi), the yellow-bearded anole (Anolis gundlachi), the emerald anole (Anolis evermanni), the Puerto Rican giant anole (Anolis cuvieri), and the Puerto Rican galliwasp or four-legged snake (Diploglossus pleii).

Guilarte State Forest has been a recognized component of the Cordillera Central Important Bird Area, along with other state forests and protected natural areas of the Central Mountain Range of Puerto Rico since 2007.

== Recreation ==
The forest reserve is open during daylight hours and offers opportunities for hiking, birdwatching and cabins. There are two main hiking trails in the forest: the San Andrés Trail which circumnavigates the forest and the Pico Guilarte trail which leads to the summit of Monte Guilarte, the highest point of the forest. Both trails offer views through a series of lookout points. Other facilities in the forest include bathrooms, barbecue pits and cabins for visitors. There are seven cabins (with room for 4 guests) available, and reservations must be made in advanced by contacting the Puerto Rico Department of Natural and Environmental Resources. Parking is available at the DRNA ranger office in Guilarte, Adjuntas at the corner of PR-518 and PR-131 roads.

Camping is not allowed within the forest but the area outside the reserve also offers additional opportunities for recreation such as Garzas Lake which is used for fishing and camping, and numerous waterfalls and pools for swimming such as Charco Mangó and Charco El Ataúd.

== See also ==
- Monte Guilarte
- Carite State Forest
- Toro Negro State Forest
- El Toro Wilderness
- El Yunque National Forest
