= Polystichum calderonense =

Conservation status
- Endangered (ESA)

Scientific classification
- Kingdom: Plantae
- Clade: Tracheophytes
- Division: Polypodiophyta
- Class: Polypodiopsida
- Order: Polypodiales
- Suborder: Polypodiineae
- Family: Dryopteridaceae
- Genus: Polystichum
- Species: P. calderonense

Binomial name
- Polystichum calderonense Proctor

Species of plant

Polystichum calderonense is a rare species of fern known by the common name Monte Guilarte hollyfern. It is endemic to Puerto Rico, where it occurs in the Guilarte State Forest. There are only 57 individual plants remaining. It is a federally listed endangered species of the United States.

This evergreen terrestrial fern grows in mountains of volcanic origin. It is known from only two locations, one in a forest which is privately owned and another on public land that may be vulnerable to inadequate forest management practices.
