= Yahuecas, Adjuntas, Puerto Rico =

Barrio in Puerto Rico

Yahuecas
- Barrio
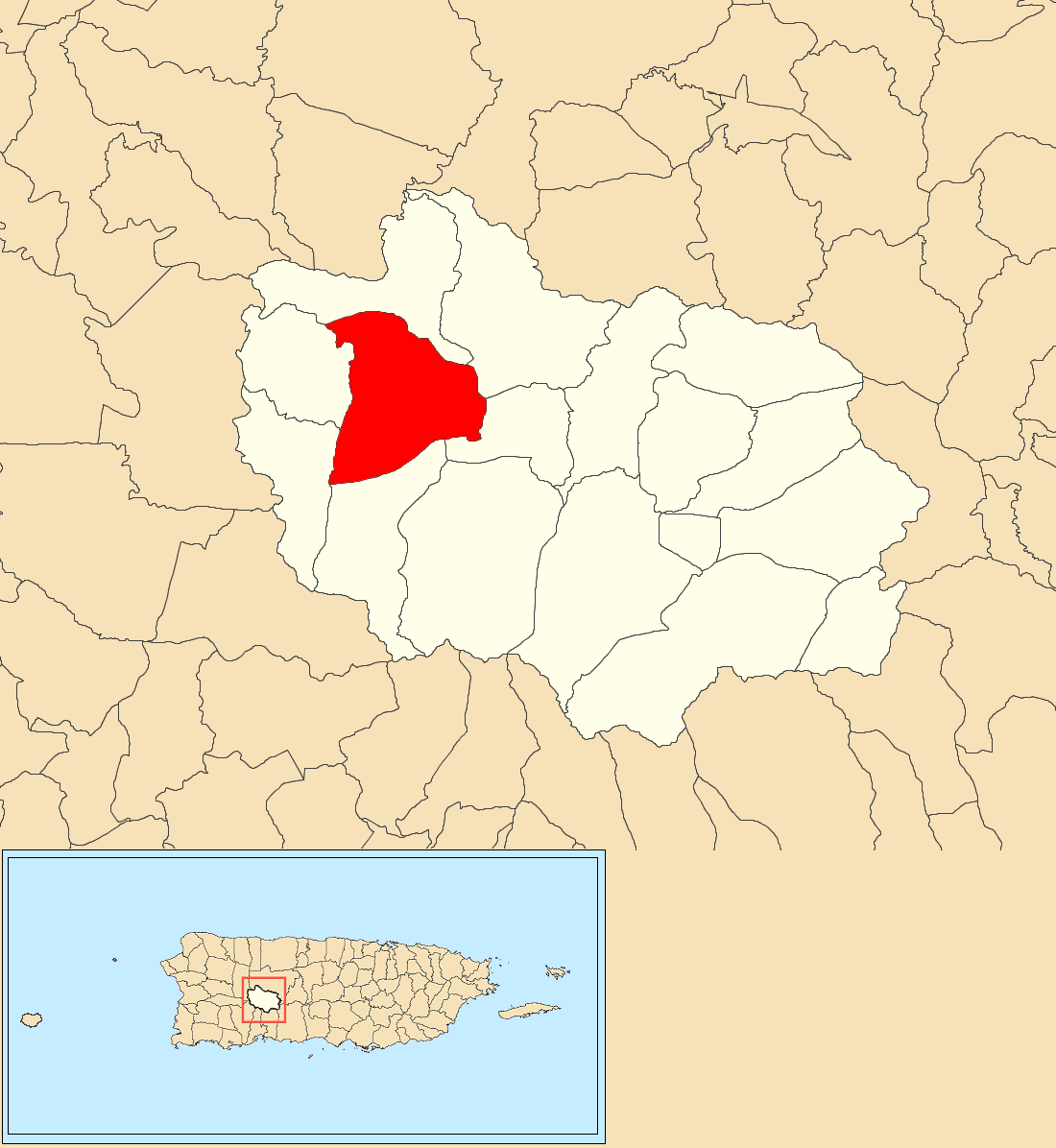
- Location of Yahuecas barrio within the municipality of Adjuntas shown in red

- Location of Puerto Rico
- Coordinates: 18°11′55″N 66°47′45″W
- Commonwealth: Puerto Rico
- Municipality: Adjuntas

Area
  - Total: 4.76 sq mi (12.3 km^{2})
  - Land: 4.76 sq mi (12.3 km^{2})
  - Water: 0 sq mi (0 km^{2})
- Elevation: 1,598 ft (487 m)

Population (2010)
  - Total: 1,396
  - Density: 293.3/sq mi (113.2/km^{2})
- Source: 2010 Census
- Time zone: UTC−4 (AST)
- Website: adjuntaspr.com

Yahuecas is a rural barrio in the municipality of Adjuntas, Puerto Rico. The population of Yahuecas in 2010 was 1,396.

== History ==
Yahuecas was in Spain's gazetteers until Puerto Rico was ceded by Spain in the aftermath of the Spanish–American War under the terms of the Treaty of Paris of 1898 and became an unincorporated territory of the United States. In 1899, the United States Department of War conducted a census of Puerto Rico finding that the population of Yahuecas barrio was 1,710.

Historical population
Census	Pop.	Note	%±
1900	1,710		—
1910	1,575		−7.9%
1920	1,704		8.2%
1930	1,770		3.9%
1940	1,860		5.1%
1950	2,044		9.9%
1960	1,712		−16.2%
1970	1,364		−20.3%
1980	1,319		−3.3%
1990	1,497		13.5%
2000	1,434		−4.2%
2010	1,396		−2.6%
U.S. Decennial Census; 1899 (shown as 1900) 1910-1930; 1930-1950 1960 1980-2000 2010

== Special Community ==
Since 2001 when law 1-2001 was passed, measures have been taken to identify and address the high levels of poverty and lack of resources and opportunities affecting specific communities in Puerto Rico. Initially there were 686 places that made the list. By 2008, there were 742 places on the list of Comunidades especiales de Puerto Rico. The places on the list are barrios, communities, sectors, or neighborhoods and Yahuecas was one of the seven areas in Adjuntas that made the list of Special Community.

In August 2020, the United States released Federal Emergency Management Agency funds in support of the coffee industry, directly benefitting a coffee packaging plant in Yahuecas barrio. The funds were in response to millions of dollars lost by the agricultural industry of Puerto Rico when Hurricane Maria hit the commonwealth on September 20, 2017.

== See also ==
- List of communities in Puerto Rico
