= Limaní, Adjuntas, Puerto Rico =

Barrio in Puerto Rico

Limaní
- Barrio
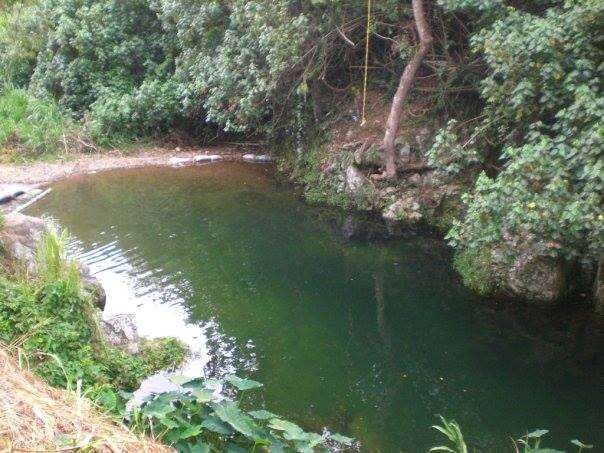
- Charco El Mangó in Limaní

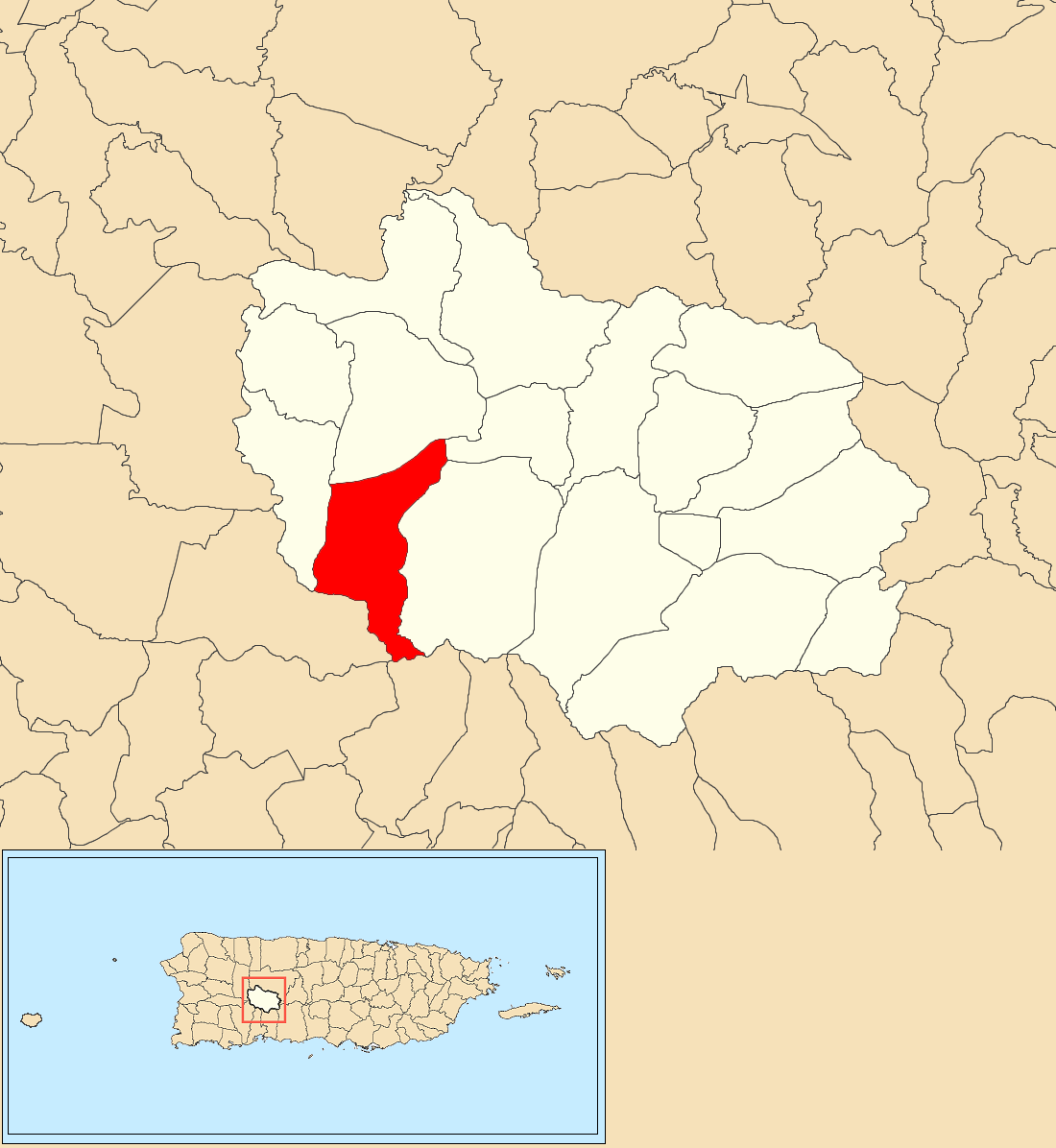
- Location of Limaní barrio within the municipality of Adjuntas shown in red

- Location of Puerto Rico
- Coordinates: 18°09′45″N 66°48′06″W
- Commonwealth: Puerto Rico
- Municipality: Adjuntas

Area
  - Total: 3.69 sq mi (9.6 km^{2})
  - Land: 3.69 sq mi (9.6 km^{2})
  - Water: 0 sq mi (0 km^{2})
- Elevation: 2,438 ft (743 m)

Population (2010)
  - Total: 276
  - Density: 74.8/sq mi (28.9/km^{2})
- Source: 2010 Census
- Time zone: UTC−4 (AST)
- Website: adjuntaspr.com

Limaní is a rural barrio in the municipality of Adjuntas, Puerto Rico.

== History ==
Limaní was in Spain's gazetteers until Puerto Rico was ceded by Spain in the aftermath of the Spanish–American War under the terms of the Treaty of Paris of 1898 and became an unincorporated territory of the United States. In 1899, the United States Department of War conducted a census of Puerto Rico finding that the population of Limaní barrio was 1,075.

Historical population
Census	Pop.	Note	%±
1900	1,075		—
1910	1,012		−5.9%
1920	949		−6.2%
1930	810		−14.6%
1940	823		1.6%
1950	651		−20.9%
1960	447		−31.3%
1970	345		−22.8%
1980	218		−36.8%
1990	286		31.2%
2000	341		19.2%
2010	276		−19.1%
U.S. Decennial Census; 1899 (shown as 1900) 1910-1930; 1930-1950 1960 1980-2000 2010

There is an agricultural center associated with the University of Puerto Rico off Puerto Rico Highway 525, in Limaní, where a variety of citrus is grown.

== Notable residents ==
- José Esteban Lopez Maldonado, "Agricultural Son of Puerto Rico" is Puerto Rico's youngest farmer and agricultural entrepreneur. He launched the Esteban Bianchi Maldonado Agricultural School in 2017 (Escuela Agrícola Esteban Bianchi Maldonado) when he was 14 years old.

== See also ==
- List of communities in Puerto Rico
