= Yayales, Adjuntas, Puerto Rico =

Barrio in Puerto Rico

Yayales
- Barrio
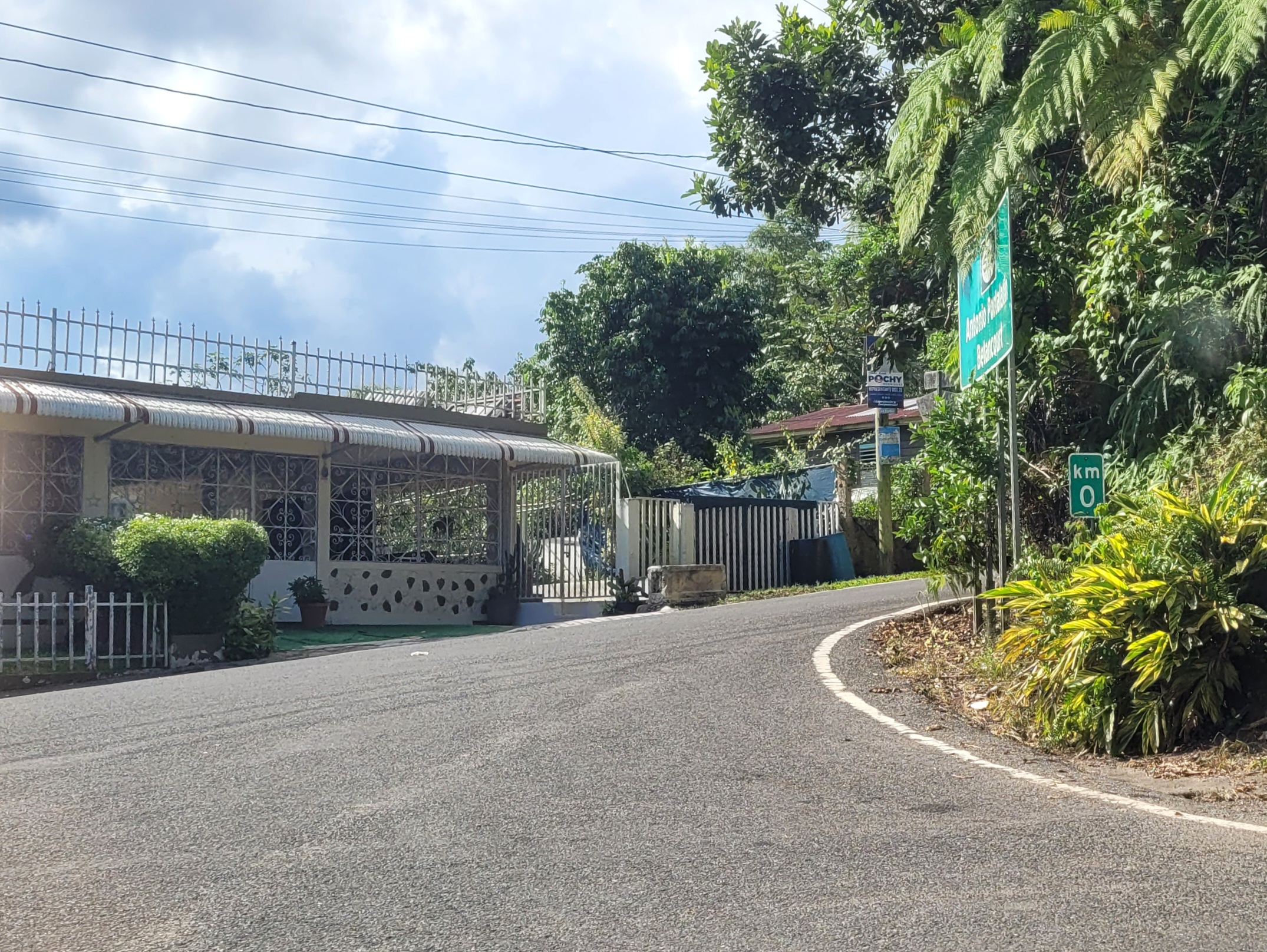
- Puerto Rico Highway 526 between Capáez and Yayales

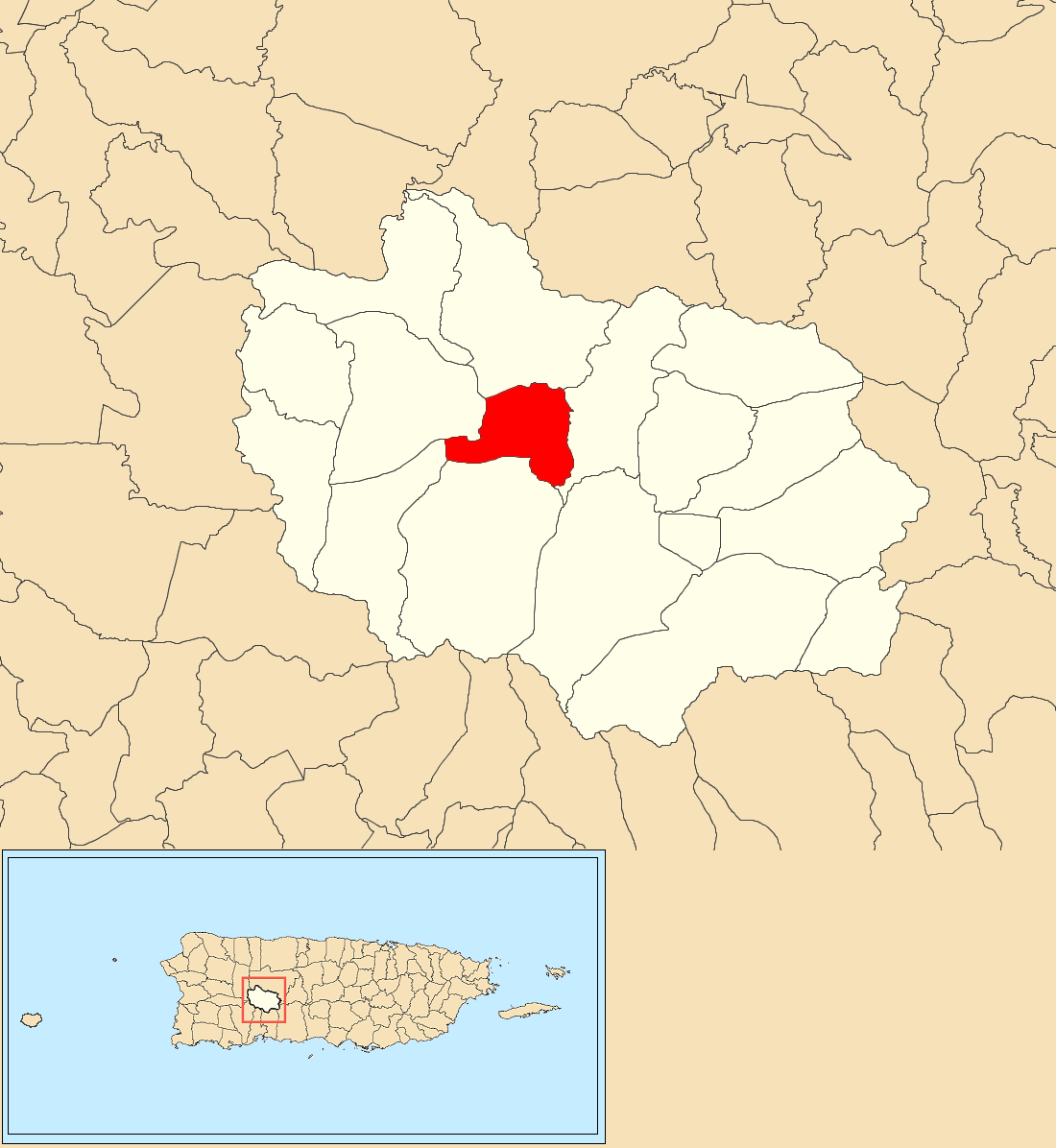
- Location of Yayales barrio within the municipality of Adjuntas shown in red

- Location of Puerto Rico
- Coordinates: 18°11′24″N 66°45′56″W
- Commonwealth: Puerto Rico
- Municipality: Adjuntas

Area
  - Total: 2.12 sq mi (5.5 km^{2})
  - Land: 2.12 sq mi (5.5 km^{2})
  - Water: 0 sq mi (0 km^{2})
- Elevation: 2,037 ft (621 m)

Population (2010)
  - Total: 676
  - Density: 318.9/sq mi (123.1/km^{2})
- Source: 2010 Census
- Time zone: UTC−4 (AST)
- Website: adjuntaspr.com

Yayales is a rural barrio in the municipality of Adjuntas, Puerto Rico.

== History ==
Yayales was in Spain's gazetteers until Puerto Rico was ceded by Spain in the aftermath of the Spanish–American War under the terms of the Treaty of Paris of 1898 and became an unincorporated territory of the United States. In 1899, the United States Department of War conducted a census of Puerto Rico finding that the population of Yayales barrio was 660.

Historical population
Census	Pop.	Note	%±
1900	660		—
1910	602		−8.8%
1920	598		−0.7%
1930	511		−14.5%
1940	589		15.3%
1950	680		15.4%
1960	510		−25.0%
1970	388		−23.9%
1980	568		46.4%
1990	641		12.9%
2000	619		−3.4%
2010	676		9.2%
U.S. Decennial Census; 1899 (shown as 1900) 1910-1930; 1930-1950 1960 1980-2000 2010

== See also ==
- List of communities in Puerto Rico
