= Guilarte, Adjuntas, Puerto Rico =

Barrio in Puerto Rico

Guilarte
- Barrio
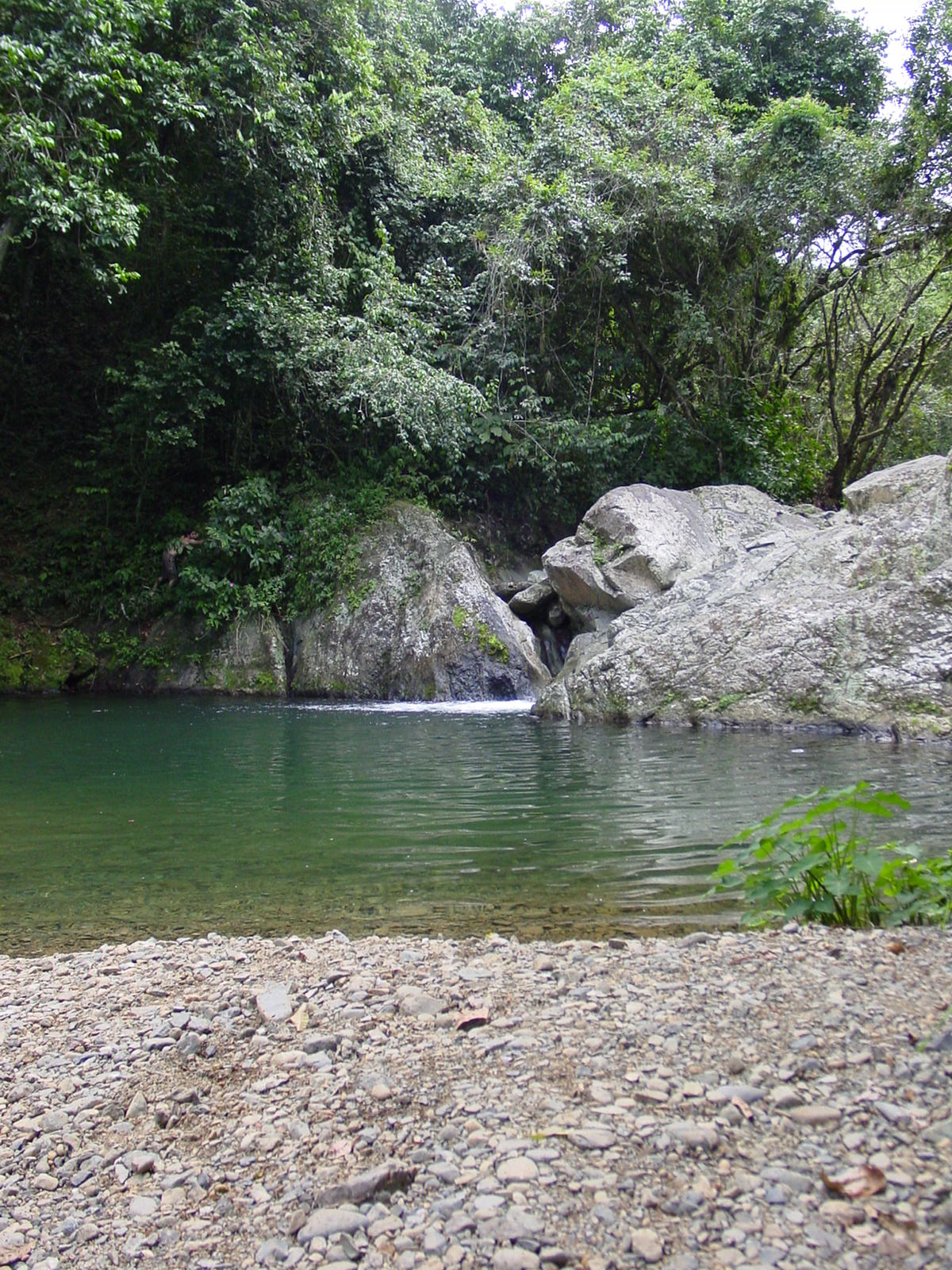
- Charco Mangó in Guilarte

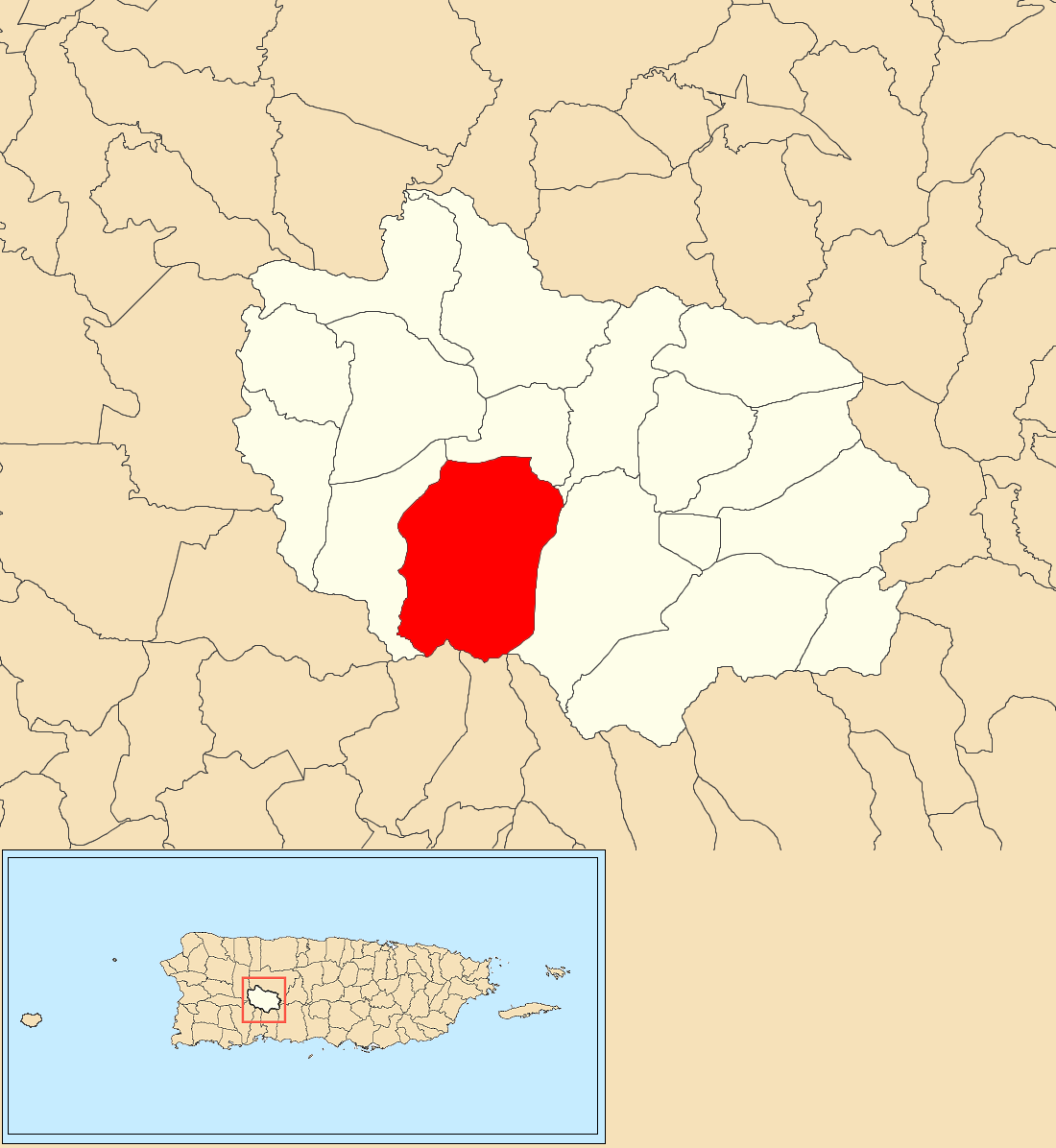
- Location of Guilarte barrio within the municipality of Adjuntas shown in red

- Location of Puerto Rico
- Coordinates: 18°09′33″N 66°46′36″W
- Commonwealth: Puerto Rico
- Municipality: Adjuntas

Area
  - Total: 6.99 sq mi (18.1 km^{2})
  - Land: 6.99 sq mi (18.1 km^{2})
  - Water: 0 sq mi (0 km^{2})
- Elevation: 2,507 ft (764 m)

Population (2010)
  - Total: 1,176
  - Density: 168.2/sq mi (64.9/km^{2})
- Source: 2010 Census
- Time zone: UTC−4 (AST)
- Website: adjuntaspr.com

Guilarte is a rural barrio in the municipality of Adjuntas, Puerto Rico.

== History ==
Guilarte was one of the subdivisions of Adjuntas described by statistician Manuel Úbeda y Delgado in 1878. Guilarte was a large coffee producer throughout the 19th century.

== Demographics ==
Guilarte was in Spain's gazetteers until Puerto Rico was ceded by Spain in the aftermath of the Spanish–American War under the terms of the Treaty of Paris of 1898 and became an unincorporated territory of the United States. In 1899, the United States Department of War conducted a census of Puerto Rico finding that the population of Guilarte barrio was 1,019.

Historical population
Census	Pop.	Note	%±
1900	1,019		—
1910	713		−30.0%
1920	657		−7.9%
1930	641		−2.4%
1940	731		14.0%
1950	1,040		42.3%
1960	787		−24.3%
1970	985		25.2%
1980	1,200		21.8%
1990	1,170		−2.5%
2000	1,123		−4.0%
2010	1,176		4.7%
U.S. Decennial Census; 1899 (shown as 1900) 1910-1930; 1930-1950 1960 1980-2000 2010

== Landmarks and places of interest ==
- El Mangó is a waterfall and charca (plunge pool) of the Yahuecas River.
- Guilarte State Forest, and its eponymous Monte Guilarte, is one of the 21 state forests of Puerto Rico. Its headquarters and Puerto Rico Department of Natural Resources (DRNA) ranger office are located within the barrio.

== See also ==
- List of communities in Puerto Rico
