= List of barrios and sectors of Yabucoa, Puerto Rico =

Like all municipalities of Puerto Rico, Yabucoa is subdivided into administrative units called barrios, which are, in contemporary times, roughly comparable to minor civil divisions, (and means wards or boroughs or neighborhoods in English). The barrios and subbarrios, in turn, are further subdivided into smaller local populated place areas/units called sectores (sectors in English). The types of sectores may vary, from normally sector to urbanización to reparto to barriada to residencial, among others. Some sectors appear in two barrios.

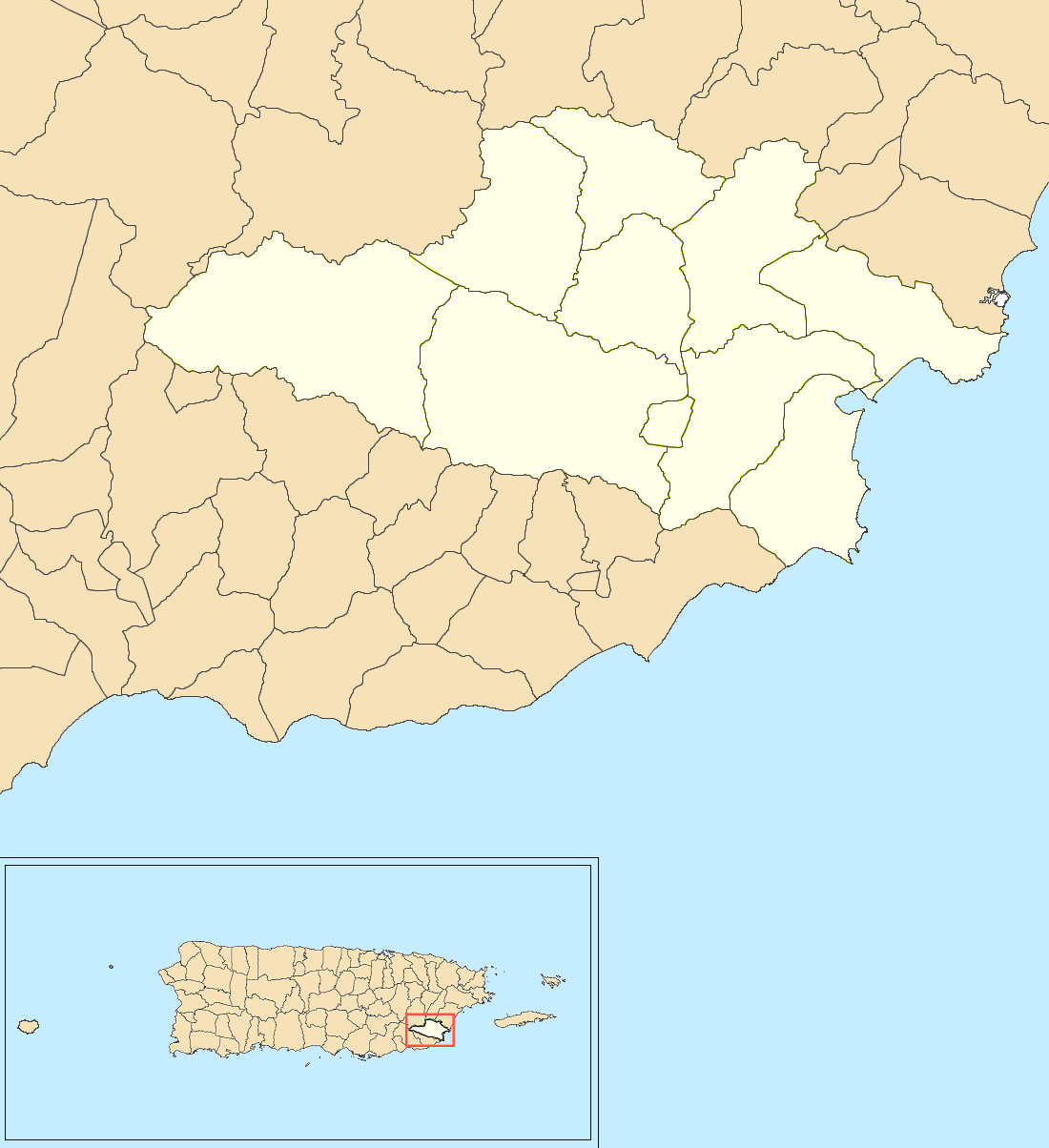
Yabucoa map with barrio subdivisions

== List of sectors by barrio ==
=== Aguacate ===
- Camino Antonio Rodríguez
- Camino El Cabrito
- Camino Luis Ortiz
- Extensión Villas de Buenaventura
- Parcelas Comunas Nuevas
- Parcelas Comunas Viejas
- Sector Aguacate Adentro
- Sector Aguacate Arriba
- Sector Calle El Sol
- Sector El Cerro
- Sector Ingenio
- Sector Jagueyes
- Sector La Curva
- Sector Los Alicea
- Sector Mariana II
- Sector Parrilla
- Sector Raja Boca
- Urbanización Alturas de Terralinda
- Urbanización Villas de Buenaventura

=== Calabazas ===
- Carretera 900
- Parcelas Nuevas
- Sector Calabazas Arriba
- Sector Guayabo
- Sector Playita Arriba
- Sector Playita
- Sector Rincón
- Sector Sodoma o Calabazas Adentro
- Sector Vieques
- Sector Villa Kilí
- Sector y Parcelas Rosa Sánchez
- Urbanización Jaime C. Rodríguez
- Urbanización Santa María
- Urbanización Valles de las Calabazas

=== Camino Nuevo ===
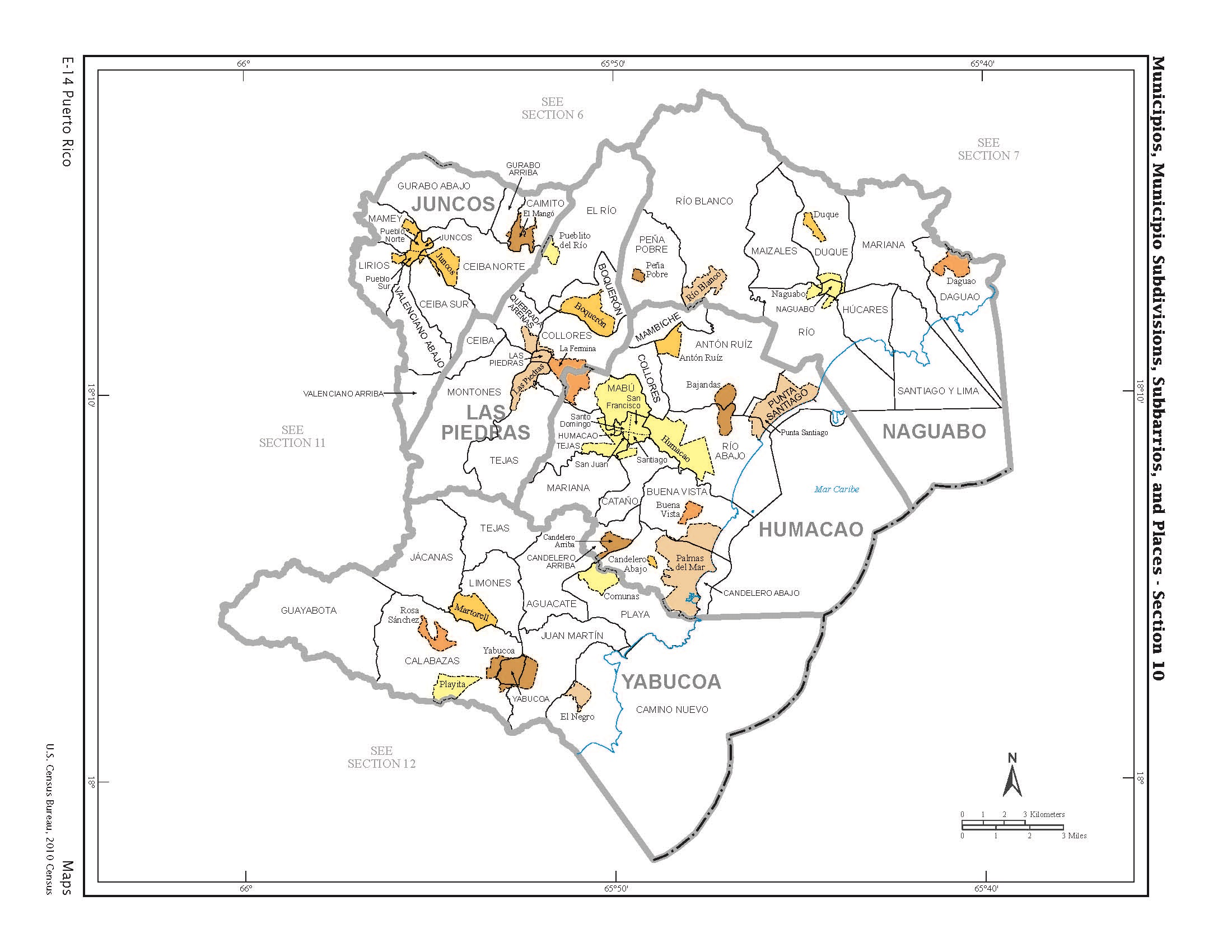
US 2010 Census map of subdivisions of Yabucoa and its neighboring municipios to the north

- Carretera 901
- Parcelas Camino Nuevo
- Sector El Cocal
- Sector El Guano
- Sector El Negro
- Sector El Nuevo Cuño
- Sector Loma del Viento
- Sector Los Colones
- Sector Maloja
- Sector Riefkohl
- Sector Rincón
- Sector Tamarindo

=== Guayabota ===
- Camino Doña Zaza
- Sector El Cruce
- Sector El Veinte
- Sector La Aldea
- Sector La Coa
- Sector La Herradura
- Sector Las Panas
- Sector Los Sánchez
- Sector Quebrada Grande
- Sector Quebradillas
- Sector Surillo
- Sector Tres Puntos

=== Jácanas ===
- Sector Campo Alegre
- Sector Jácanas Abajo
- Sector Jácanas Arriba
- Sector Jácanas Granja
- Sector Jácanas Sur
- Sector Piedras Blancas

=== Juan Martín ===
- Apartamentos Ernesto Carrasquillo
- Barriada Poblado Varsovia
- Residencial Dr. Víctor Berríos
- Reparto Horizonte
- Sector Central Roig
- Sector Cerro Santa Elena
- Sector La Pica
- Sector La Villa
- Sector Las Panas
- Sector Los Casanova
- Sector Pandura
- Urbanización Méndez
- Urbanización Santa Elena
- Urbanización Solimar
- Urbanización Valles de Yabucoa
- Urbanización Villa Hilda

=== Limones ===
- Parcelas Martorell
- Sector Borinquen
- Sector La Casa
- Sector La Laura
- Sector Martorell Arriba
- Sector Vieques

=== Playa ===
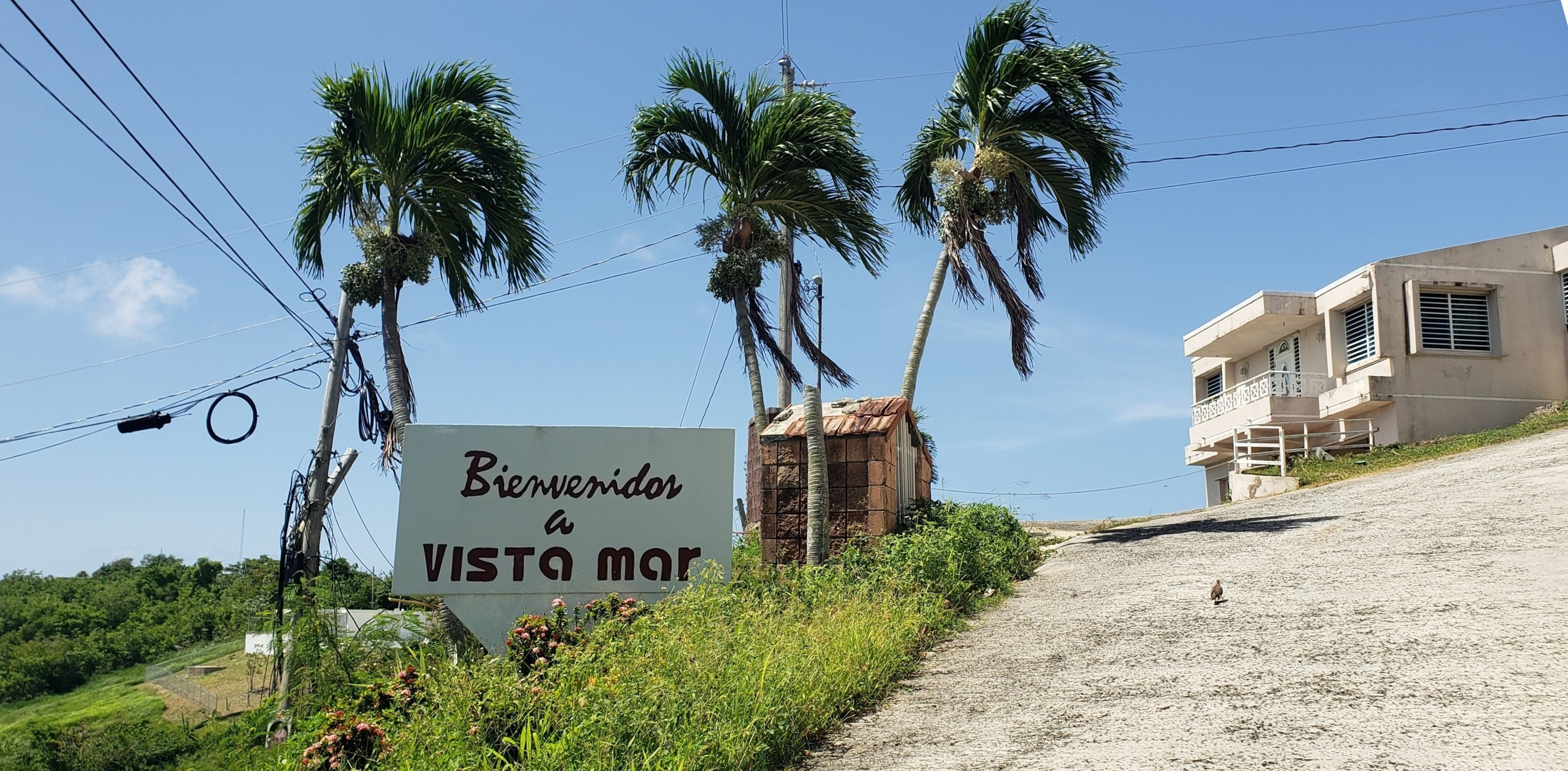
Urbanización Vista Mar in Playa barrio in Yabucoa

- Sector Calambreñas
- Sector El Hoyo
- Sector Gandular
- Sector Las Lomas
- Sector Los Pavos
- Sector Los Pinos
- Sector Paraíso I
- Sector Paraíso II
- Sector Parrilla
- Sector Playa Guayanés
- Sector Veteranos
- Sector Windy Hills
- Urbanización Vista Mar

=== Tejas ===
- Carretera 639
- Sector Los Tres Puntos
- Sector Piedra Azul
- Sector Tejas Afuera y Adentro
- Sector Valerio Velázquez

=== Yabucoa barrio-pueblo ===
- Sector El Tosquero
- Sector Poblado Calvario
- Urbanización Francisco Sustache
- Urbanización Jardines de Yabucoa
- Urbanización Los Angeles
- Urbanización Nueva
- Urbanización Ramos Antonini
- Urbanización Villa Recreo
- Urbanización Yabucoa Real

== See also ==
- List of communities in Puerto Rico
