= Yabucoa Valley =

Valley in Puerto Rico

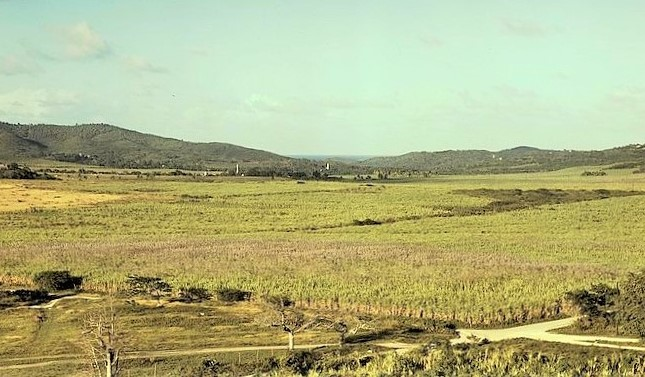
- Photo of the Yabucoa Valley and sugarcane plantations, by Jack Delano, 1941

Geography
- Location: Puerto Rico
- Coordinates: 18.05526°N 65.82733°W
- Interactive map of Yabucoa Valley

The Yabucoa Valley (Spanish: Valle de Yabucoa) is a large fluvial valley located in the southeastern coast of Puerto Rico in the municipality of Yabucoa. The valley is surrounded by the hills of the San Lorenzo batholith to the north and west, by the Cuchillas de Panduras mountain ridge to the south, and by the Caribbean Sea to the east. The hills surrounding the Yabucoa Valley as well as the bedrock underlying the alluvium in the valley are composed of the San Lorenzo batholith, a large, igneous intrusive body emplaced during the Late Cretaceous. The town of Yabucoa is the main settlement of the valley.

The valley is part of a hydrological basin that is fed by the Guayanés, Arenas, Limones and Ingenio rivers, and by smaller streams such as the Guayabota and Cortadera creeks, all of which flow into the Yabucoa Bay and the Caribbean Sea. The rich hydrological resources are historical important for the cultivation of sugarcane, and sugar used to be processed in the Roig Sugarcane Refinery (Spanish: Central Roig) until 2002. The lower part of the valley used to host a Gulf oil refinery (later owned by Shell). Although the sugar industry has diminished since the late 20th century, today the fertile lands are mainly used for cattle grazing and the cultivation of fruit and vegetables.

== See also ==
- Geography of Puerto Rico
