= Aguacate, Yabucoa, Puerto Rico =

Barrio of Puerto Rico

Aguacate
- Barrio
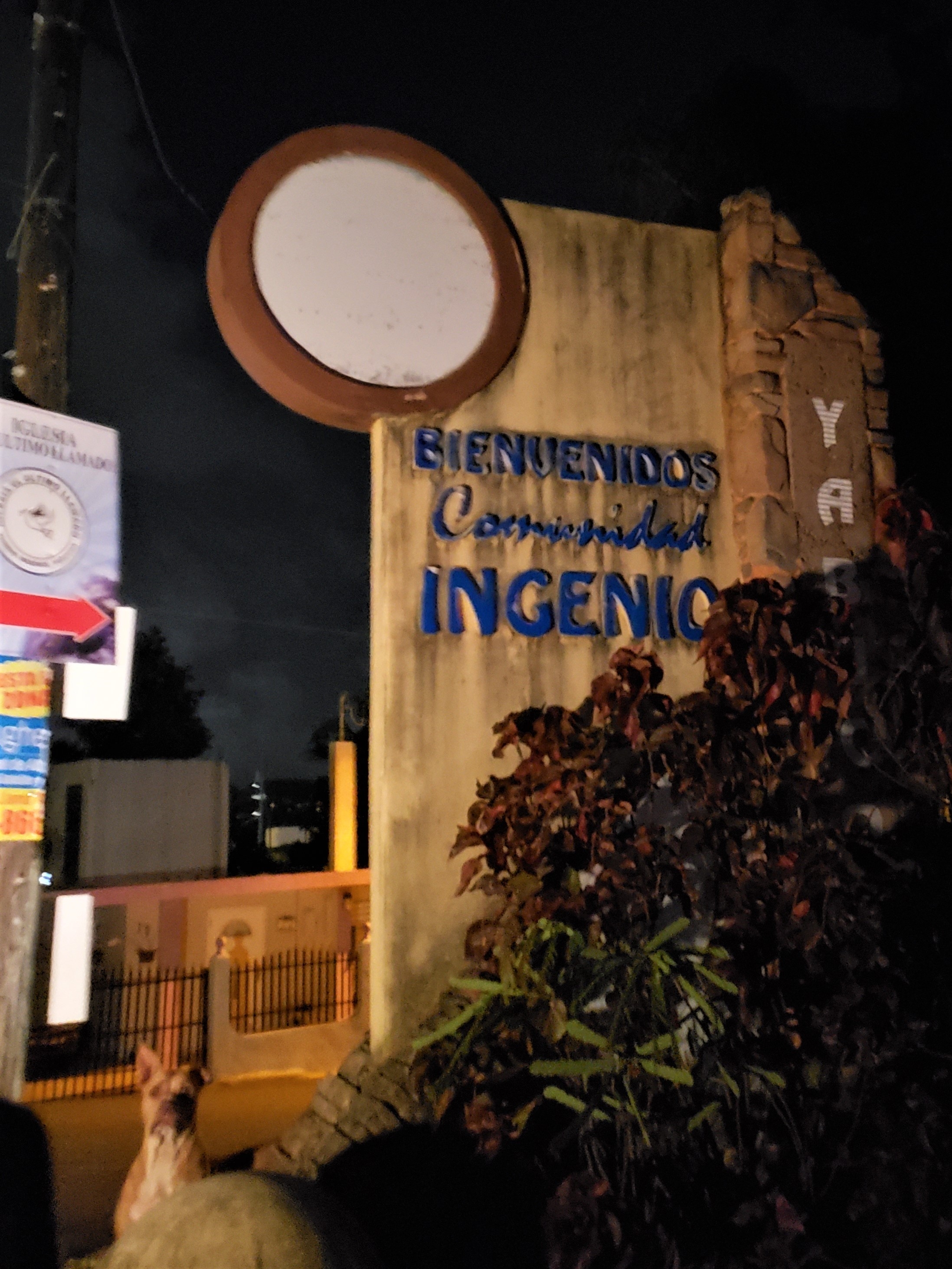
- Entrance sign to Comunidad Ingenio in Aguacate, 2020

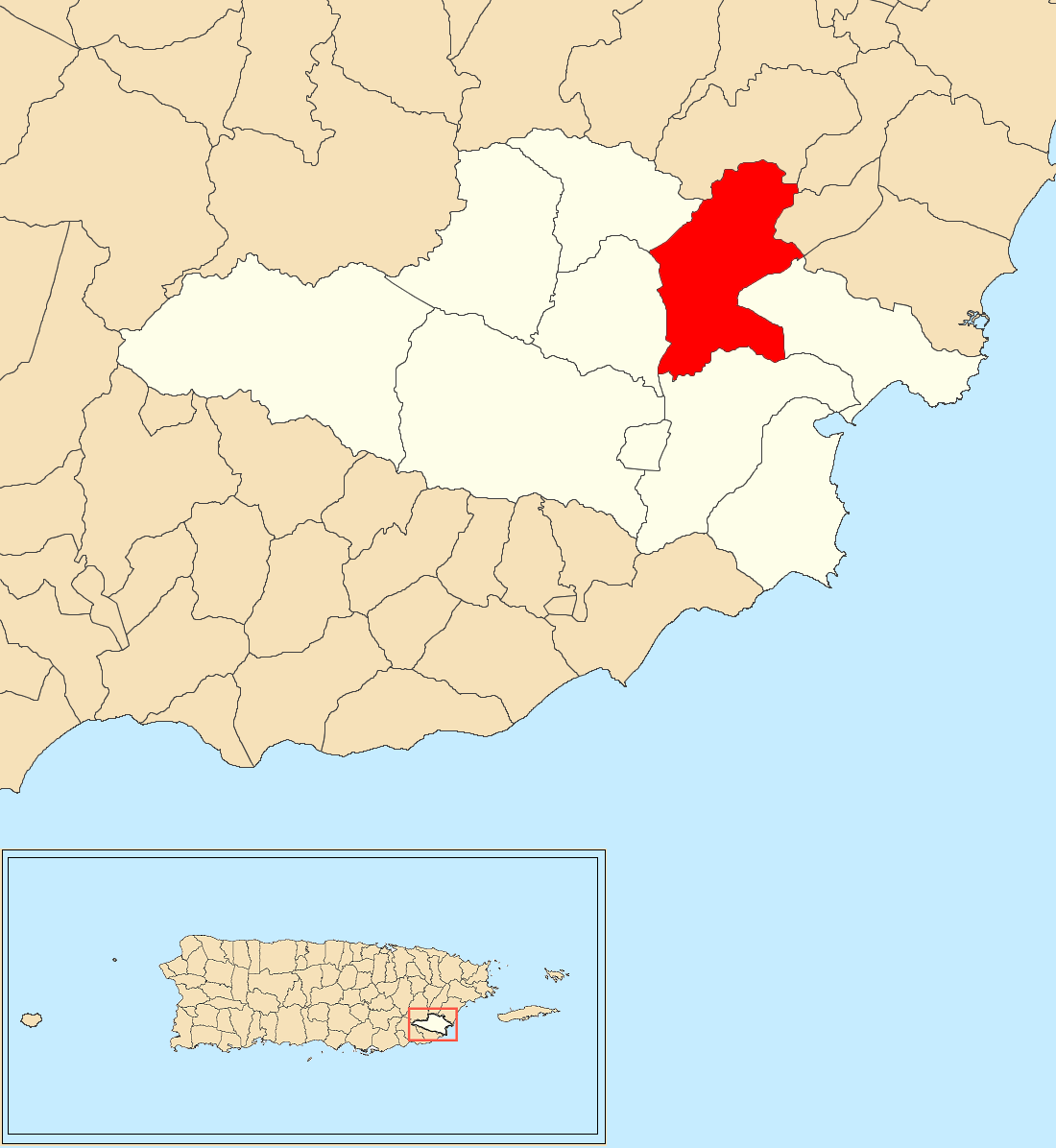
- Location of Aguacate within the municipality of Yabucoa shown in red

- Location of Puerto Rico
- Coordinates: 18°05′29″N 65°51′30″W
- Commonwealth: Puerto Rico
- Municipality: Yabucoa

Area
  - Total: 5.41 sq mi (14.0 km^{2})
  - Land: 5.41 sq mi (14.0 km^{2})
  - Water: 0 sq mi (0 km^{2})
- Elevation: 66 ft (20 m)

Population (2010)
  - Total: 2,828
  - Density: 522.7/sq mi (201.8/km^{2})
- Source: 2010 Census
- Time zone: UTC−4 (AST)
- ZIP Code: 00767
- Area code: 787/939

Aguacate is a barrio in the municipality of Yabucoa, Puerto Rico. Its population in 2010 was 2,828.

== History ==
Aguacate was in Spain's gazetteers until Puerto Rico was ceded by Spain in the aftermath of the Spanish–American War under the terms of the Treaty of Paris of 1898 and became an unincorporated territory of the United States. In 1899, the United States Department of War conducted a census of Puerto Rico finding that the population of Aguacate barrio was 1,374.

Historical population
Census	Pop.	Note	%±
1900	1,374		—
1910	1,589		15.6%
1920	2,218		39.6%
1930	2,136		−3.7%
1940	2,824		32.2%
1950	2,043		−27.7%
1960	2,839		39.0%
1970	2,606		−8.2%
1980	2,587		−0.7%
1990	2,553		−1.3%
2000	2,758		8.0%
2010	2,828		2.5%
U.S. Decennial Census; 1899 (shown as 1900) 1910-1930; 1930-1950 1980-2000 2010

== Sectors ==
Barrios (which are, in contemporary times, roughly comparable to minor civil divisions) in turn are further subdivided into smaller local populated place areas/units called sectores (sectors in English). The types of sectores may vary, from normally sector to urbanización to reparto to barriada to residencial, among others.

The following sectors are in Aguacate barrio:

Camino Antonio Rodríguez, Camino El Cabrito, Camino Luis Ortiz, Extensión Villas de Buenaventura, Parcelas Comunas Nuevas, Parcelas Comunas Viejas, Sector Aguacate Adentro, Sector Aguacate Arriba, Sector Calle El Sol, Sector El Cerro, Sector Ingenio, Sector Jagueyes, Sector La Curva, Sector Los Alicea, Sector Mariana II, Sector Parrilla, Sector Raja Boca, Urbanización Alturas de Terralinda, and Urbanización Villas de Buenaventura.

== See also ==
- List of communities in Puerto Rico
- List of barrios and sectors of Yabucoa, Puerto Rico
