= Limones, Yabucoa, Puerto Rico =

Barrio of Puerto Rico

Limones
- Barrio
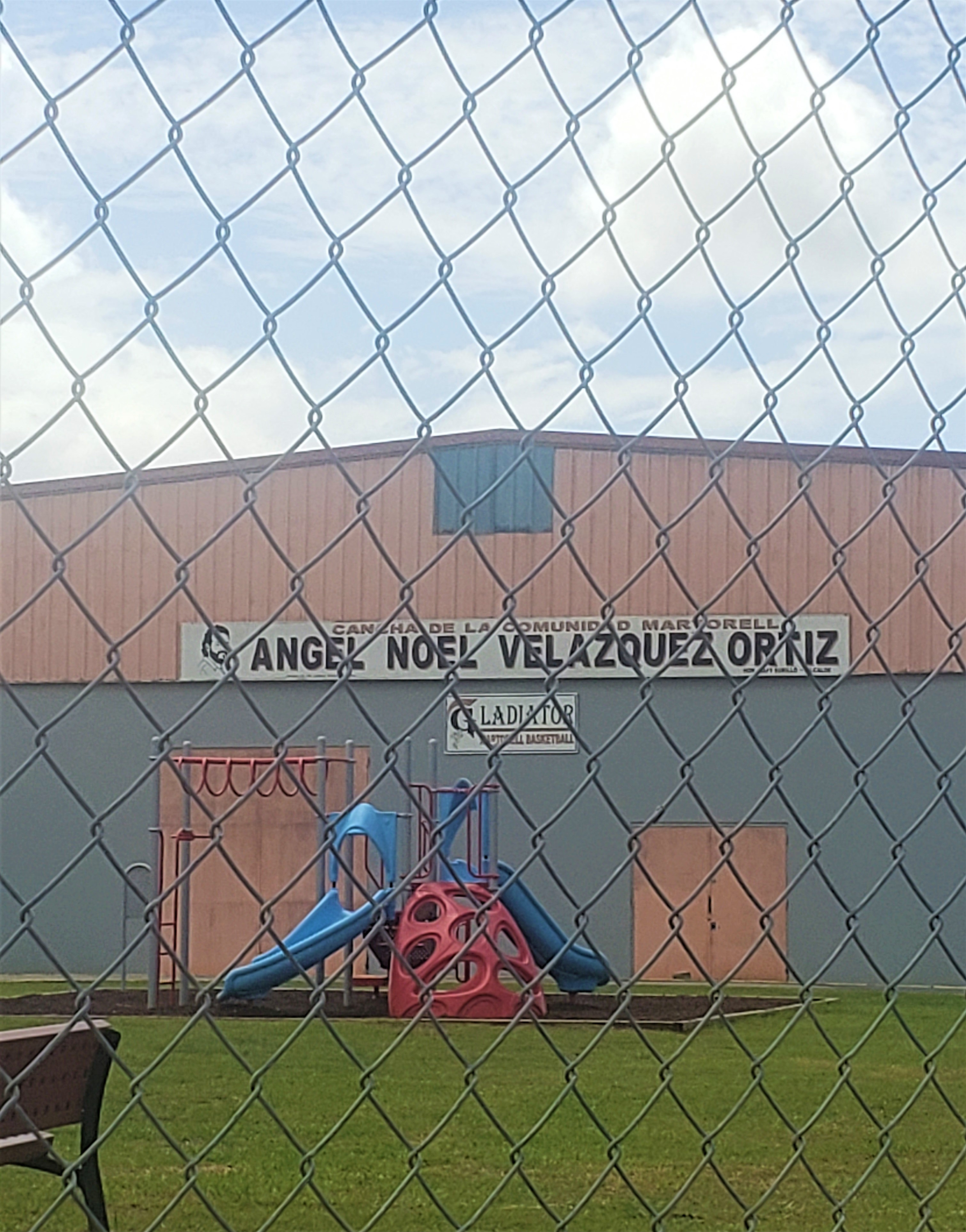
- Cancha de la Comunidad Martorell Ángel Noel Velázquez Ortiz, a sports venue in Limones

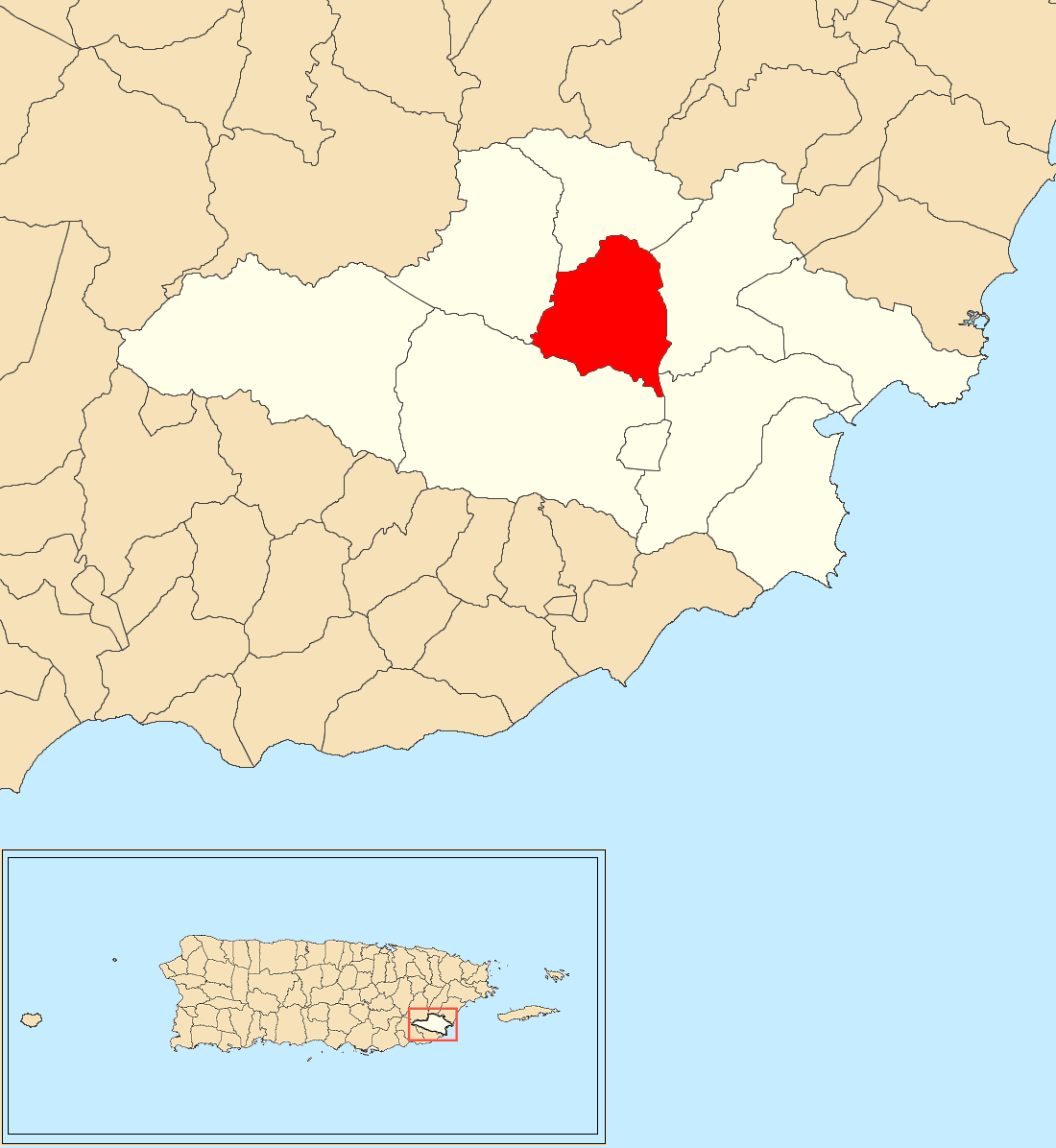
- Location of Limones within the municipality of Yabucoa shown in red

- Location of Puerto Rico
- Coordinates: 18°04′48″N 65°53′20″W
- Commonwealth: Puerto Rico
- Municipality: Yabucoa

Area
  - Total: 3.82 sq mi (9.9 km^{2})
  - Land: 3.82 sq mi (9.9 km^{2})
  - Water: 0 sq mi (0 km^{2})
- Elevation: 66 ft (20 m)

Population (2010)
  - Total: 3,234
  - Density: 846.6/sq mi (326.9/km^{2})
- Source: 2010 Census
- Time zone: UTC−4 (AST)
- ZIP Code: 00767
- Area code: 787/939

Limones is a barrio in the municipality of Yabucoa, Puerto Rico. Its population in 2010 was 3,234.

== History ==
Limones was in Spain's gazetteers until Puerto Rico was ceded by Spain in the aftermath of the Spanish–American War under the terms of the Treaty of Paris of 1898 and became an unincorporated territory of the United States. In 1899, the United States Department of War conducted a census of Puerto Rico finding that the population of Limones barrio was 1,139.

Historical population
Census	Pop.	Note	%±
1900	1,139		—
1910	1,415		24.2%
1920	1,356		−4.2%
1930	1,404		3.5%
1940	1,491		6.2%
1950	2,638		76.9%
1960	3,754		42.3%
1970	3,399		−9.5%
1980	3,567		4.9%
1990	3,766		5.6%
2000	3,770		0.1%
2010	3,234		−14.2%
U.S. Decennial Census; 1899 (shown as 1900) 1910-1930; 1930-1950 1980-2000 2010

== Sectors ==
Barrios (which are, in contemporary times, roughly comparable to minor civil divisions) in turn are further subdivided into smaller local populated place areas/units called sectores (sectors in English). The types of sectores may vary, from normally sector to urbanización to reparto to barriada to residencial, among others.

The following sectors are in Limones barrio:

Parcelas Martorell, Sector Borinquen, Sector La Casa, Sector La Laura, Sector Martorell Arriba, and Sector Vieques.

== Places ==
The Ángel Noel Velázquez Ortiz basketball court, named after a local of Yabucoa, is located in the Martorell comunidad in Limones.

== Gallery ==
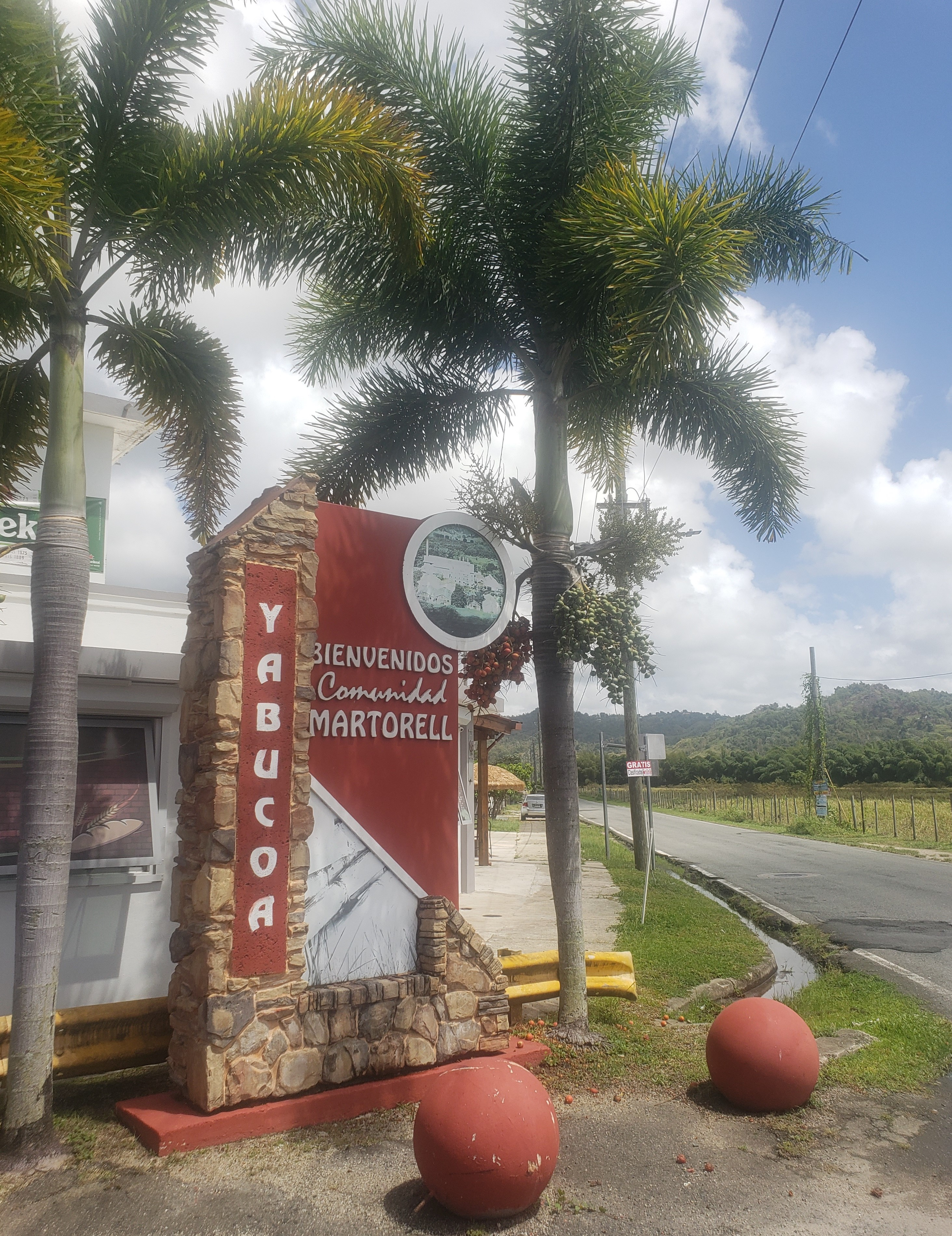
Welcome sign for Comunidad Martorell in Limones barrio

== See also ==
- List of communities in Puerto Rico
- List of barrios and sectors of Yabucoa, Puerto Rico
