= Tejas, Yabucoa, Puerto Rico =

Barrio of Puerto Rico

Tejas
- Barrio
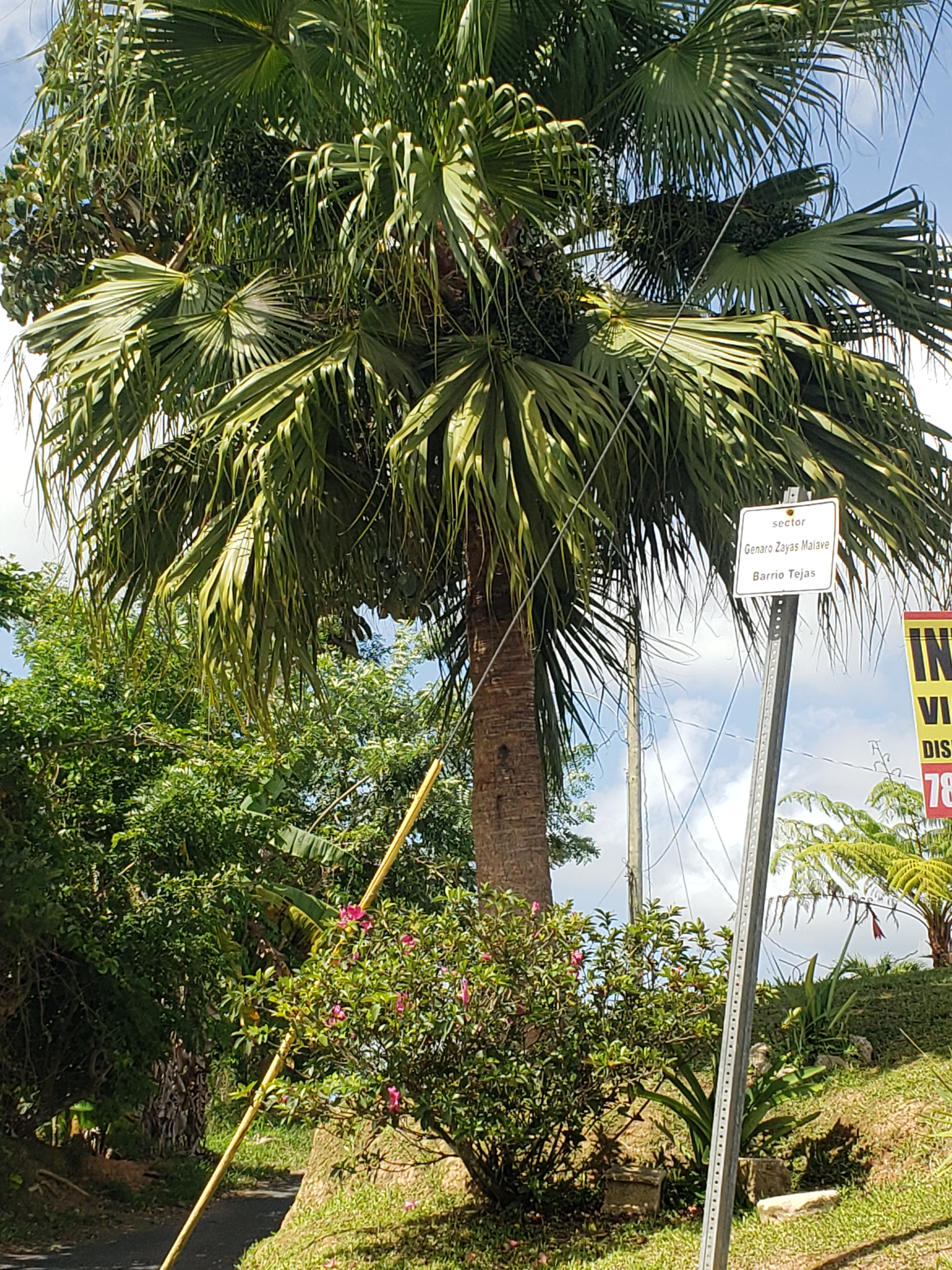
- Sector Genaro Zayas Malave in Bo. Tejas

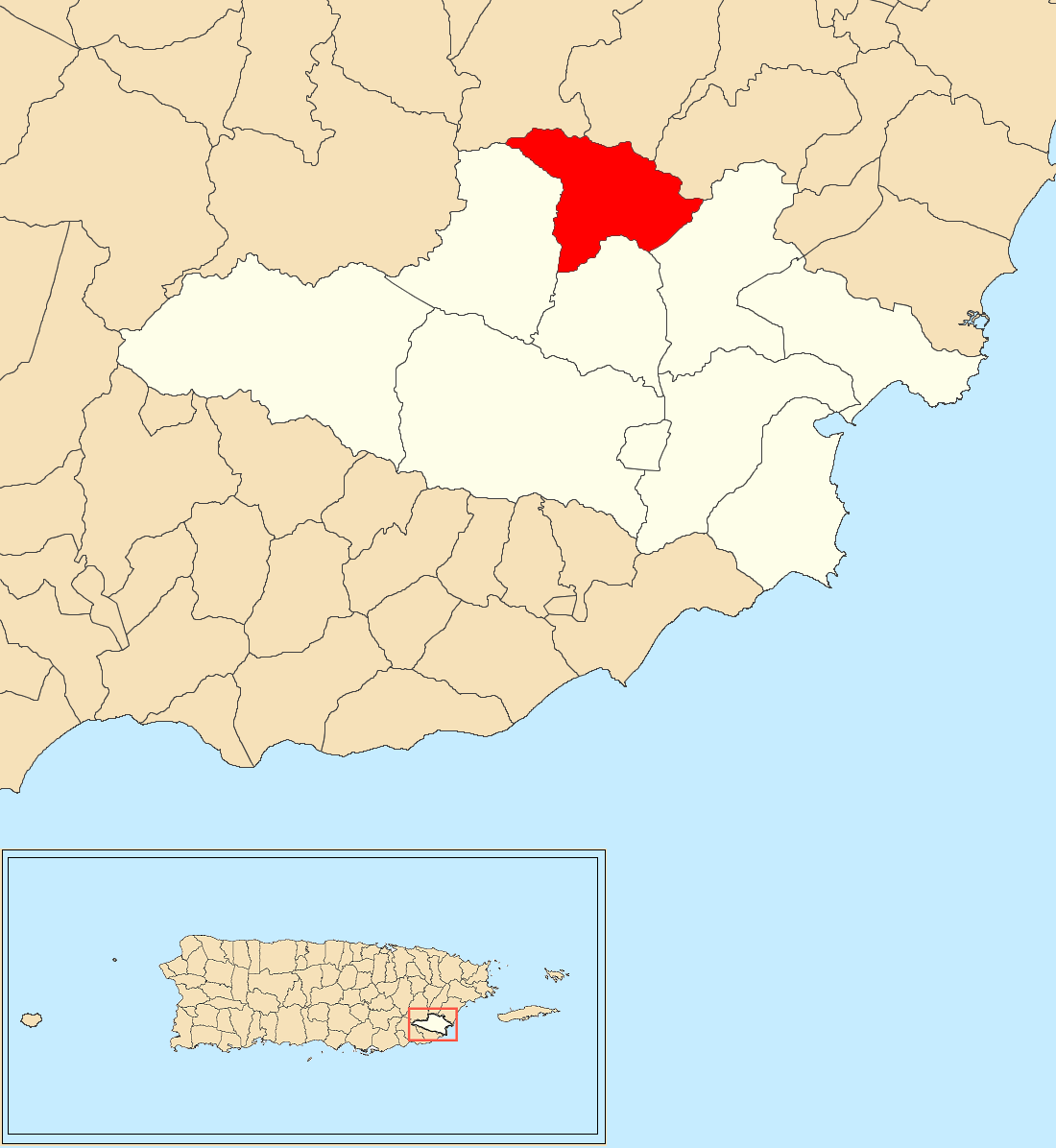
- Location of Tejas within the municipality of Yabucoa shown in red

- Location of Puerto Rico
- Coordinates: 18°06′34″N 65°53′23″W
- Commonwealth: Puerto Rico
- Municipality: Yabucoa

Area
  - Total: 3.85 sq mi (10.0 km^{2})
  - Land: 3.85 sq mi (10.0 km^{2})
  - Water: 0 sq mi (0 km^{2})
- Elevation: 794 ft (242 m)

Population (2010)
  - Total: 3,044
  - Density: 790.6/sq mi (305.3/km^{2})
- Source: 2010 Census
- Time zone: UTC−4 (AST)
- ZIP Code: 00767
- Area code: 787/939

Tejas is a barrio in the municipality of Yabucoa, Puerto Rico. Its population in 2010 was 3,044.

== History ==
Tejas was in Spain's gazetteers until Puerto Rico was ceded by Spain in the aftermath of the Spanish–American War under the terms of the Treaty of Paris of 1898 and became an unincorporated territory of the United States. In 1899, the United States Department of War conducted a census of Puerto Rico finding that the population of Tejas barrio was 933.

Historical population
Census	Pop.	Note	%±
1900	933		—
1910	1,237		32.6%
1920	1,442		16.6%
1930	1,671		15.9%
1940	1,951		16.8%
1950	1,702		−12.8%
1960	1,626		−4.5%
1970	1,487		−8.5%
1980	2,199		47.9%
1990	2,279		3.6%
2000	2,830		24.2%
2010	3,044		7.6%
U.S. Decennial Census; 1899 (shown as 1900) 1910-1930; 1930-1950 1980-2000 2010

== Sectors ==
Barrios (which are, in contemporary times, roughly comparable to minor civil divisions) in turn are further subdivided into smaller local populated place areas/units called sectores (sectors in English). The types of sectores may vary, from normally sector to urbanización to reparto to barriada to residencial, among others.

The following sectors are in Tejas barrio: Carretera 639, Sector Genaro Zayas Malave, Sector Los Tres Puntos, Sector Piedra Azul, Sector Tejas Afuera y Adentro, and Sector Valerio Velázquez.

== See also ==
- List of communities in Puerto Rico
- List of barrios and sectors of Yabucoa, Puerto Rico
