= Camino Nuevo =

Barrio of Yabucoa, Puerto Rico

- Barrio
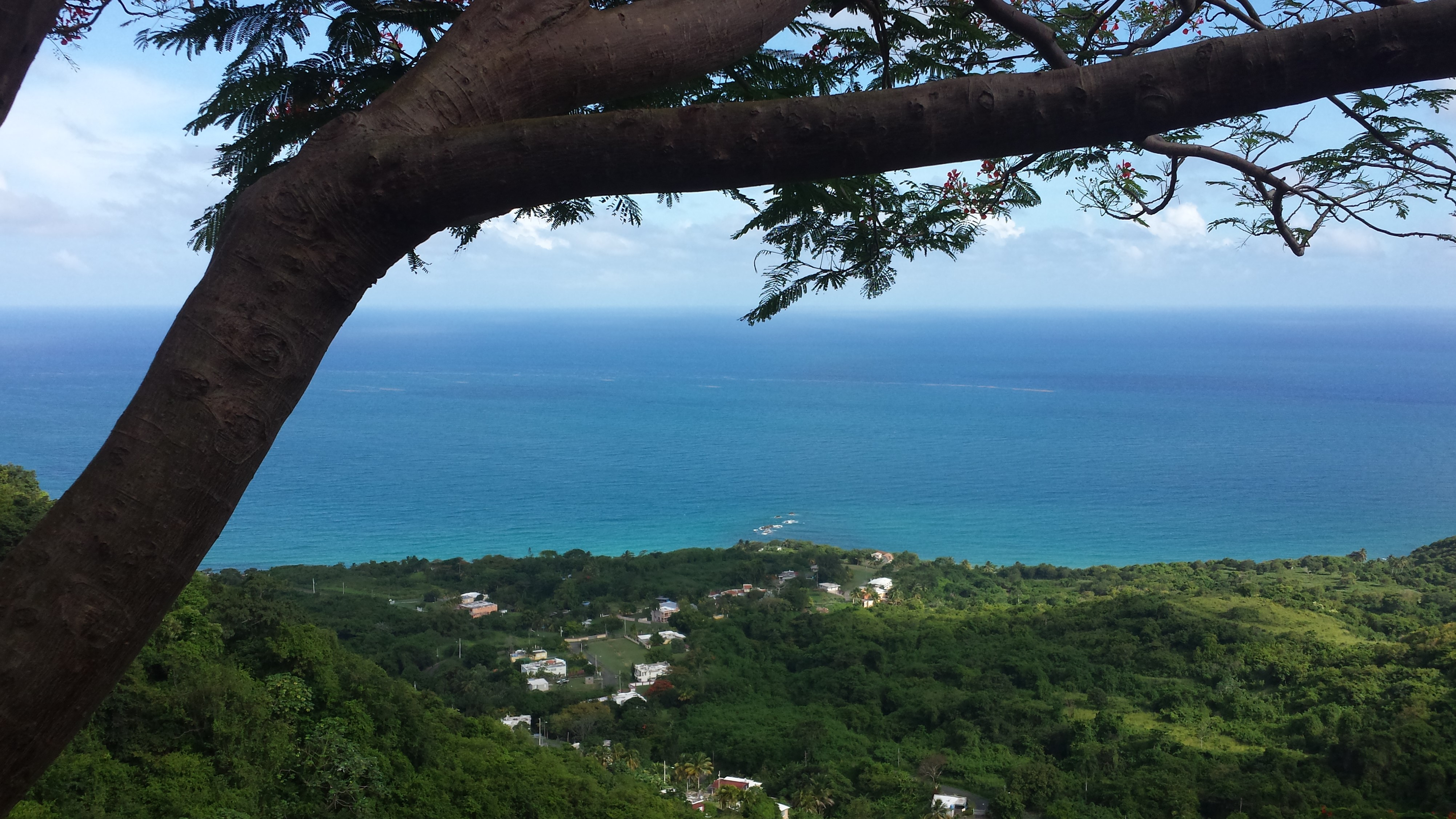
- View from Camino Nuevo

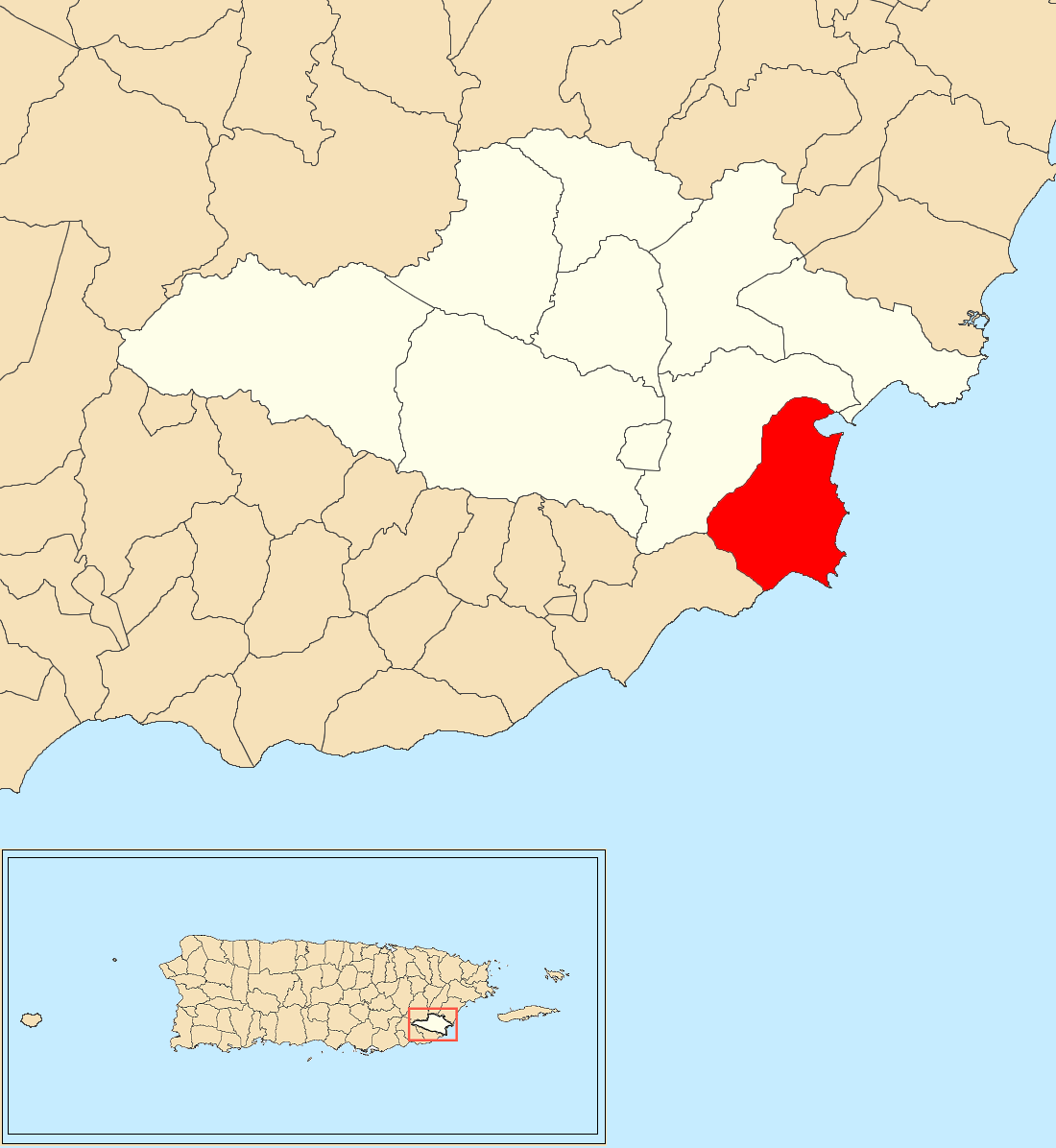
- Location of Camino Nuevo within the municipality of Yabucoa shown in red

- Location of Puerto Rico
- Coordinates: 18°01′48″N 65°49′52″W
- Commonwealth: Puerto Rico
- Municipality: Yabucoa

Area
  - Total: 32.56 sq mi (84.3 km^{2})
  - Land: 4.59 sq mi (11.9 km^{2})
  - Water: 27.97 sq mi (72.4 km^{2})
- Elevation: 0 ft (0 m)

Population (2010)
  - Total: 3,391
  - Density: 738.8/sq mi (285.3/km^{2})
- Source: 2010 Census
- Time zone: UTC−4 (AST)
- ZIP Code: 00767
- Area code: 787/939

Camino Nuevo is a barrio in the municipality of Yabucoa, Puerto Rico. Its population in 2010 was 3,391.

== Features ==
El Guano Beach is located in Camino Nuevo, Yabucoa.

== History ==
Camino Nuevo was in Spain's gazetteers until Puerto Rico was ceded by Spain in the aftermath of the Spanish–American War under the terms of the Treaty of Paris of 1898 and became an unincorporated territory of the United States. In 1899, the United States Department of War conducted a census of Puerto Rico finding that the population of Camino Nuevo barrio was 1,435.

Historical population
Census	Pop.	Note	%±
1900	1,435		—
1910	1,542		7.5%
1920	1,889		22.5%
1930	1,842		−2.5%
1940	2,137		16.0%
1950	2,685		25.6%
1960	2,771		3.2%
1970	3,023		9.1%
1980	3,055		1.1%
1990	3,530		15.5%
2000	3,919		11.0%
2010	3,391		−13.5%
U.S. Decennial Census; 1899 (shown as 1900) 1910-1930; 1930-1950 1980-2000 2010

== Sectors ==
Barrios (which are, in contemporary times, roughly comparable to minor civil divisions) in turn are further subdivided into smaller local populated place areas/units called sectores (sectors in English). The types of sectores may vary, from normally sector to urbanización to reparto to barriada to residencial, among others.

The following sectors are in Camino Nuevo barrio:

Carretera 901, Parcelas Camino Nuevo, Sector El Cocal, Sector El Guano, Sector El Negro, Sector El Nuevo Cuño, Sector Loma del Viento, Sector Los Colones, Sector Maloja, Sector Riefkohl, Sector Rincón, and Sector Tamarindo.

== See also ==
- List of communities in Puerto Rico
- List of barrios and sectors of Yabucoa, Puerto Rico
