= Juan Martín, Yabucoa, Puerto Rico =

Barrio of Puerto Rico

Juan Martín
- Barrio
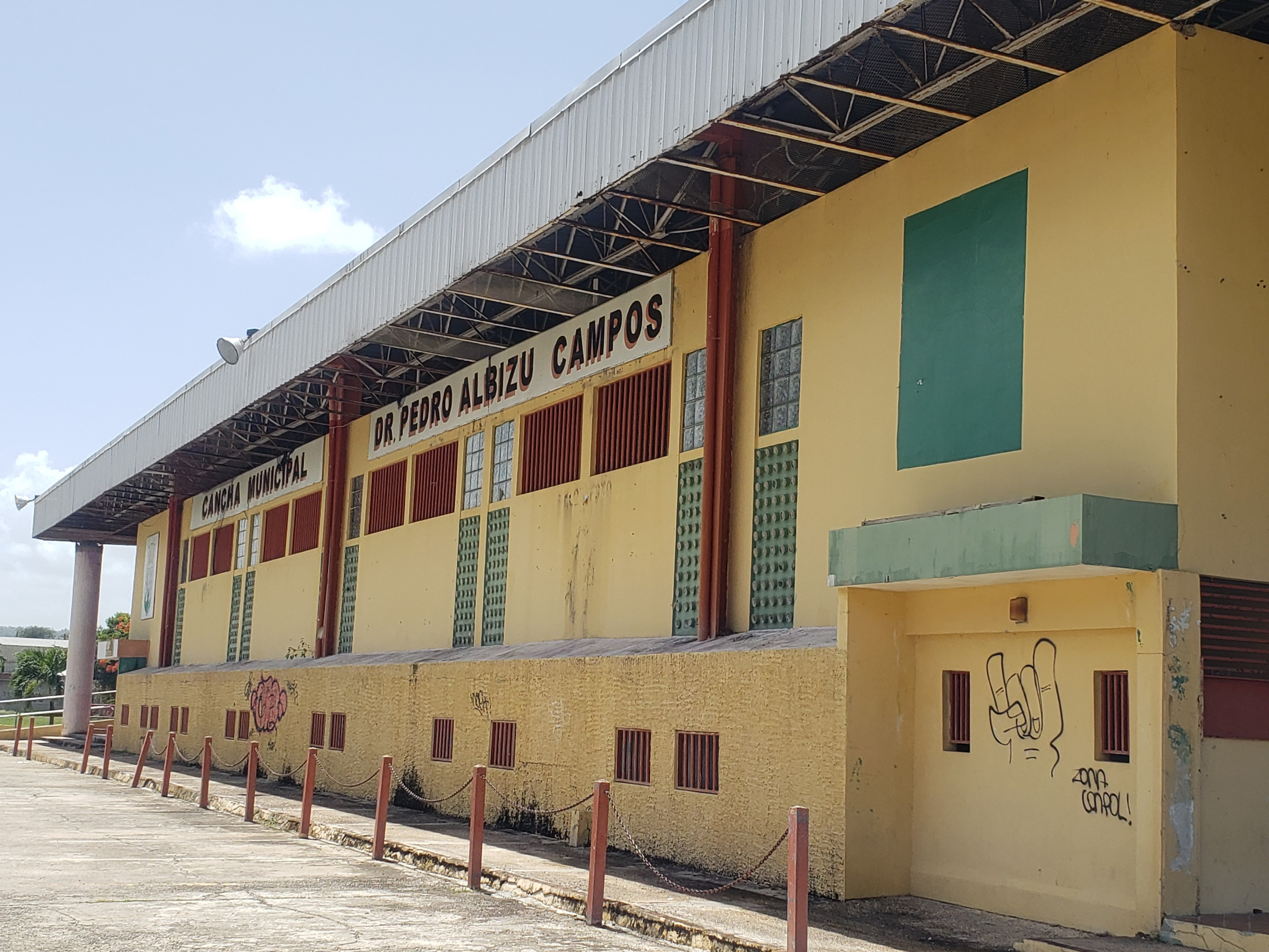
- Dr. Pedro Albizu Campos indoor basketball court in Juan Martín barrio

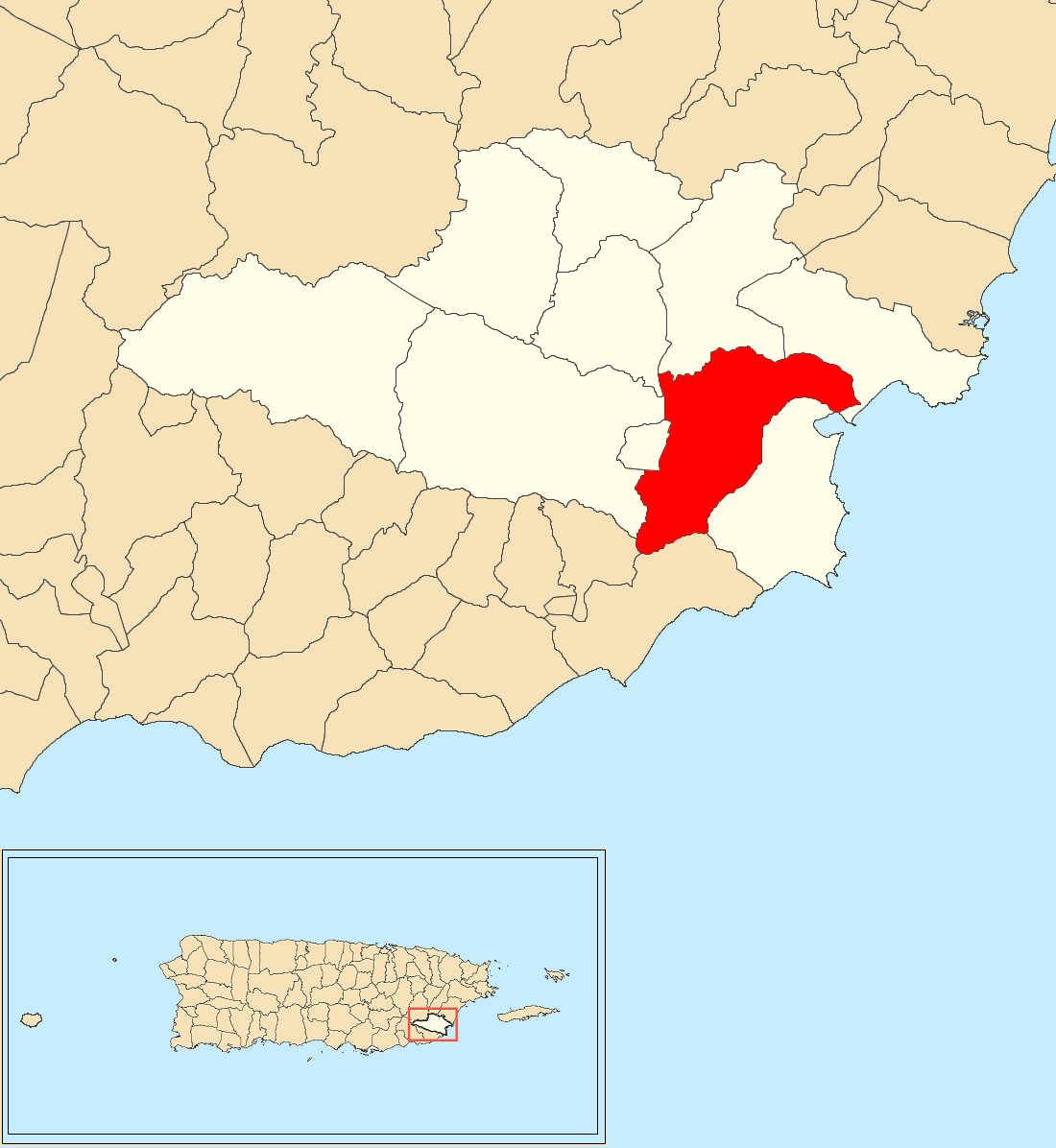
- Location of Juan Martín within the municipality of Yabucoa shown in red

- Location of Puerto Rico
- Coordinates: 18°03′35″N 65°51′36″W
- Commonwealth: Puerto Rico
- Municipality: Yabucoa

Area
  - Total: 5.74 sq mi (14.9 km^{2})
  - Land: 5.72 sq mi (14.8 km^{2})
  - Water: 0.02 sq mi (0.052 km^{2})
- Elevation: 23 ft (7.0 m)

Population (2010)
  - Total: 3,891
  - Density: 738.8/sq mi (285.3/km^{2})
- Source: 2010 Census
- Time zone: UTC−4 (AST)
- ZIP Code: 00767
- Area code: 787/939

Juan Martín is a barrio in the municipality of Yabucoa, Puerto Rico. Its population in 2010 was 3,891.

== History ==
Juan Martín was in Spain's gazetteers until Puerto Rico was ceded by Spain in the aftermath of the Spanish–American War under the terms of the Treaty of Paris of 1898 and became an unincorporated territory of the United States. In 1899, the United States Department of War conducted a census of Puerto Rico finding that the population of Juan Martín barrio was 1,473.

Historical population
Census	Pop.	Note	%±
1900	1,473		—
1910	1,854		25.9%
1920	2,056		10.9%
1930	2,206		7.3%
1940	3,114		41.2%
1950	2,194		−29.5%
1960	1,284		−41.5%
1970	0		−100.0%
1980	2,799		—
1990	3,230		15.4%
2000	3,483		7.8%
2010	3,891		11.7%
U.S. Decennial Census; 1899 (shown as 1900) 1910-1930; 1930-1950 1980-2000 2010

== Sectors ==
Barrios (which are, in contemporary times, roughly comparable to minor civil divisions) in turn are further subdivided into smaller local populated place areas/units called sectores (sectors in English). The types of sectores may vary, from normally sector to urbanización to reparto to barriada to residencial, among others.

The following sectors are in Juan Martín barrio:

Apartamentos Ernesto Carrasquillo, Barriada Poblado Varsovia, Rpto. Horizonte, Residencial Dr. Víctor Berríos, Sector Central Roig, Sector Cerro Santa Elena, Sector La Pica, Sector La Villa, Sector Las Panas, Sector Los Casanova, Sector Pandura, Urbanización Méndez, Urbanización Santa Elena, Urbanización Solimar, Urbanización Valles de Yabucoa, and Urbanización Villa Hilda.

== See also ==
- List of communities in Puerto Rico
- List of barrios and sectors of Yabucoa, Puerto Rico
