= Jácanas =

Barrio of Yabucoa, Puerto Rico

- Barrio
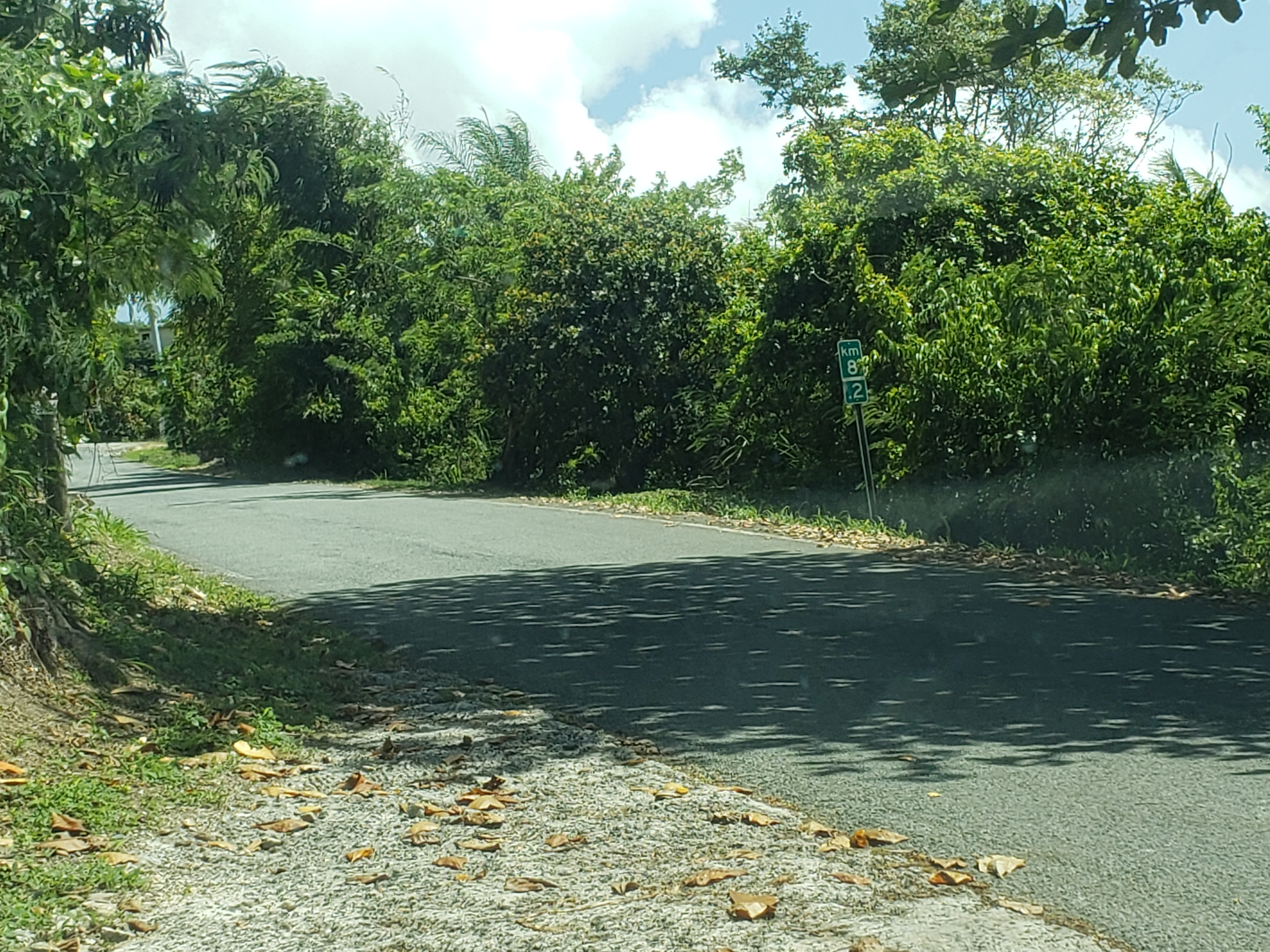
- PR-9918 in Jácanas

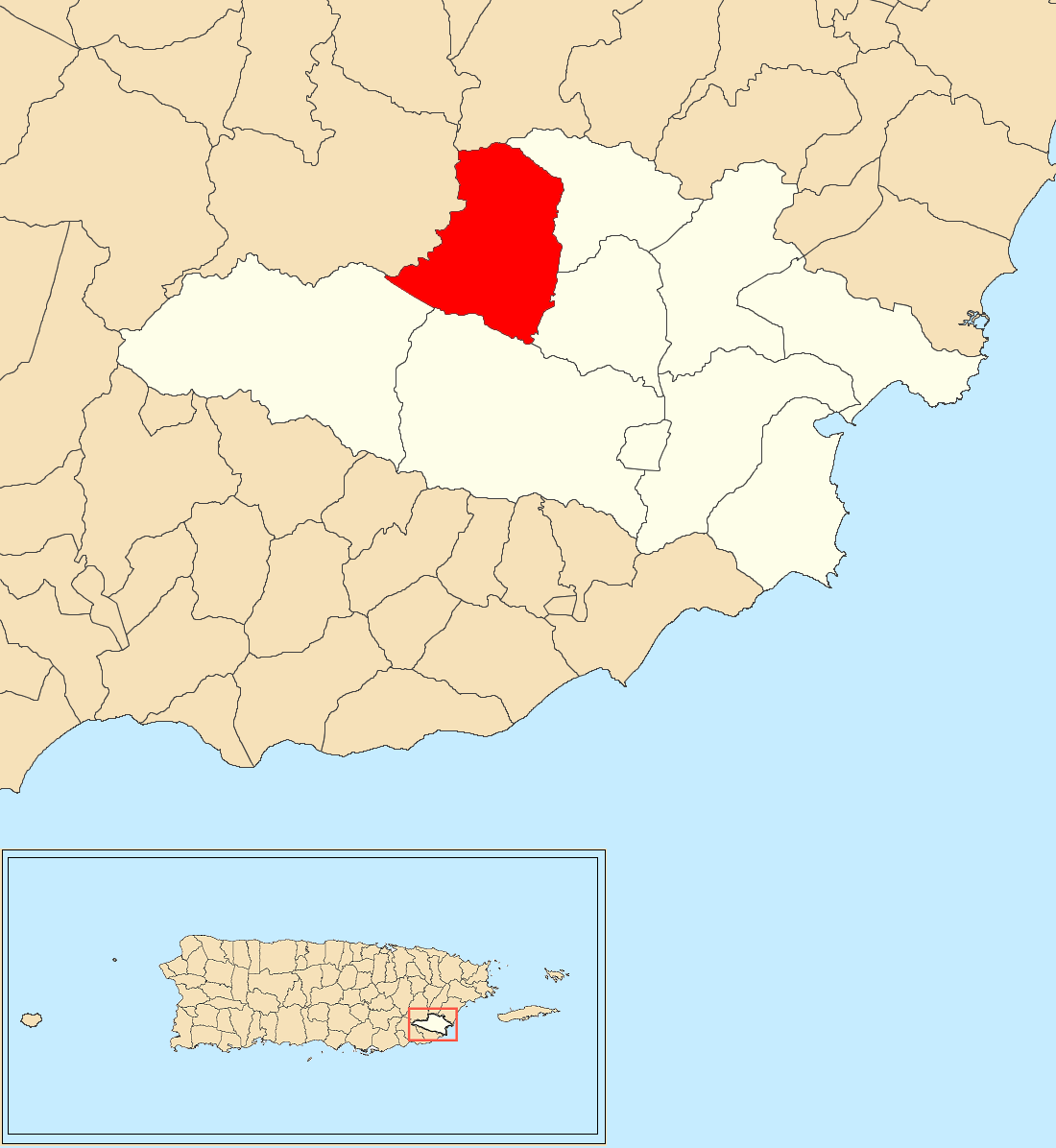
- Location of Jácanas within the municipality of Yabucoa shown in red

- Location of Puerto Rico
- Coordinates: 18°05′50″N 65°55′02″W
- Commonwealth: Puerto Rico
- Municipality: Yabucoa

Area
  - Total: 5.61 sq mi (14.5 km^{2})
  - Land: 5.61 sq mi (14.5 km^{2})
  - Water: 0 sq mi (0 km^{2})
- Elevation: 817 ft (249 m)

Population (2010)
  - Total: 3,246
  - Density: 578.6/sq mi (223.4/km^{2})
- Source: 2010 Census
- Time zone: UTC−4 (AST)
- ZIP Code: 00767
- Area code: 787/939

Jácanas is a barrio in the municipality of Yabucoa, Puerto Rico. Its population in 2010 was 3,246.

== History ==
Jácanas was in Spain's gazetteers until Puerto Rico was ceded by Spain in the aftermath of the Spanish–American War under the terms of the Treaty of Paris of 1898 and became an unincorporated territory of the United States. In 1899, the United States Department of War conducted a census of Puerto Rico finding that the population of Jácanas barrio was 1,101.

Historical population
| Census | Pop. | Note | %± |
|---|---|---|---|
| 1900 | 1,101 | | — |
| 1910 | 1,346 | | 22.3% |
| 1920 | 1,716 | | 27.5% |
| 1930 | 1,824 | | 6.3% |
| 1940 | 2,843 | | 55.9% |
| 1950 | 3,101 | | 9.1% |
| 1960 | 2,535 | | −18.3% |
| 1970 | 2,346 | | −7.5% |
| 1980 | 2,227 | | −5.1% |
| 1990 | 2,973 | | 33.5% |
| 2000 | 3,303 | | 11.1% |
| 2010 | 3,246 | | −1.7% |
U.S. Decennial Census; 1899 (shown as 1900) 1910-1930; 1930-1950 1980-2000 2010

== Sectors ==
Barrios (which are, in contemporary times, roughly comparable to minor civil divisions) in turn are further subdivided into smaller local populated place areas/units called sectores (sectors in English). The types of sectores may vary, from normally sector to urbanización to reparto to barriada to residencial, among others.

The following sectors are in Jácanas barrio:

Sector Campo Alegre, Sector Jácanas Abajo, Sector Jácanas Arriba, Sector Jácanas Granja, Sector Jácanas Sur, and Sector Piedras Blancas.

== See also ==
- List of communities in Puerto Rico
- List of barrios and sectors of Yabucoa, Puerto Rico
