= Yabucoa, Puerto Rico =

Town and municipality in Puerto Rico

Yabucoa Municipio Autónomo de Yabucoa
- Town and Municipality
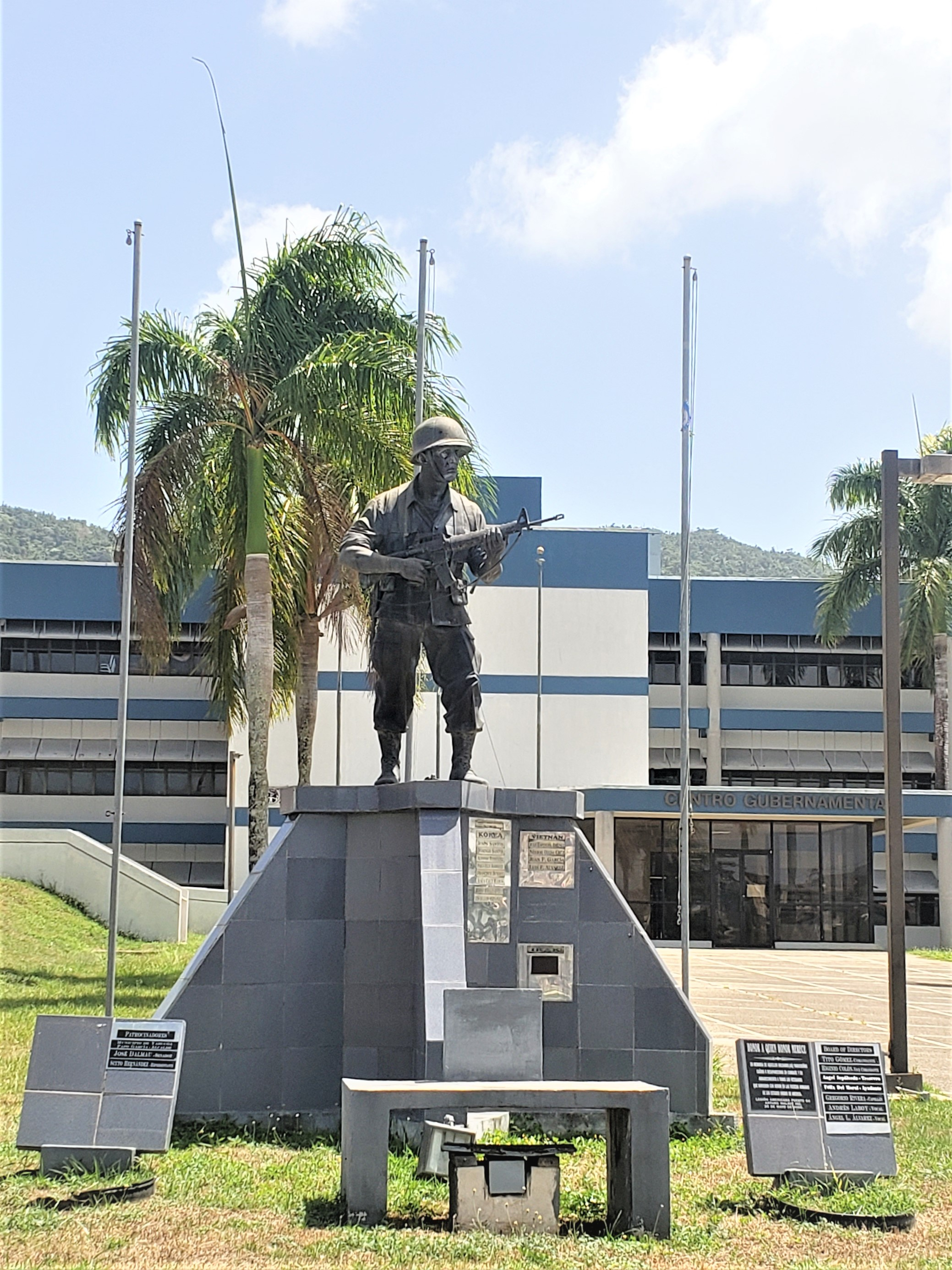
- Statue representing Puerto Rican soldier who fought in Vietnam / Korea, in front of a government building

- Flag Coat of arms
- Nicknames: "Ciudad del Azúcar", "El Pueblo de Yuca", "Los Bebe Leche"
- Anthem: "Yabucoa es mi Pueblo"
- Map of Puerto Rico highlighting Yabucoa Municipality
- Coordinates: 18°03′02″N 65°52′46″W
- Sovereign state: United States
- Commonwealth: Puerto Rico
- Founded: October 3, 1793
- Founder: Carlos Morales
- Barrios: 10 barrios: Aguacate; Calabazas; Camino Nuevo; Limones; Guayabota; Jácanas; Juan Martín; Playa; Tejas; Yabucoa barrio-pueblo

Government
  - Mayor: Rafael "Raffy" Surillo (PPD)
  - Senatorial dist.: 7 - Humacao
  - Representative dist.: 34 Ramón Luis Cruz

Area
  - Total: 83.26 sq mi (215.65 km^{2})
  - Land: 55.26 sq mi (143.11 km^{2})
  - Water: 28.01 sq mi (72.55 km^{2})

Population (2020)
  - Total: 30,426
  - Estimate (2025): 28,058 ▼
  - Rank: 40th in Puerto Rico
  - Density: 550.65/sq mi (212.61/km^{2})
- Demonym: Yabucoeños

Racial groups
  - White: 68.5%
  - Black: 8.6%
  - American Indian/AN: 0.6%
  - Asian: 0.3%
  - Other Two or more races: 13.6% 8.2%
- Time zone: UTC−4 (AST)
- ZIP Code: 00767
- Area code: 787/939

Yabucoa (Spanish pronunciation: [ʝaβuˈkoa]) is a town and municipality in Puerto Rico located in the eastern region, north of Maunabo; south of San Lorenzo, Las Piedras and Humacao; and east of Patillas. Yabucoa is spread over 9 barrios and Yabucoa Pueblo (the downtown area and the administrative center of the city). It is part of the San Juan-Caguas-Guaynabo Metropolitan Statistical Area.

== Etymology and nicknames ==
The name Yabucoa is said to come from the Taíno name Guaroca, both a toponymic and personal name meaning "where water [is found]". However this is considered a folk etymology and other linguists suggest the name is most likely a Spanish interpretation of the Taíno word yaucoa (similar to the name Yauco) which means "cassava plantation".

Some nicknames of the city are "Sugar City", after the numerous sugarcane plantations of the Yabucoa Valley, and Pueblo de Yuca ("Yuca Town") which references the Taíno origin of the name of the town. The locals are also known as the Bebe Leches ("milk drinkers") after the numerous dairy farms located in the region.

== History ==
The region of what is now Yabucoa belonged to the Taíno region of Guayaney, which covered a portion of the southeast region of Puerto Rico. The region was led by cacique Guaraca. After the Spanish colonization, the region of Yabucoa belonged to Humacao, and its territory was mostly used for cattle and farming. Yabucoa, as a town, was founded on October 3, 1793, when Don Manuel Colón de Bonilla and his wife, Doña Catalina Morales Pacheco, donated the lands to the people.

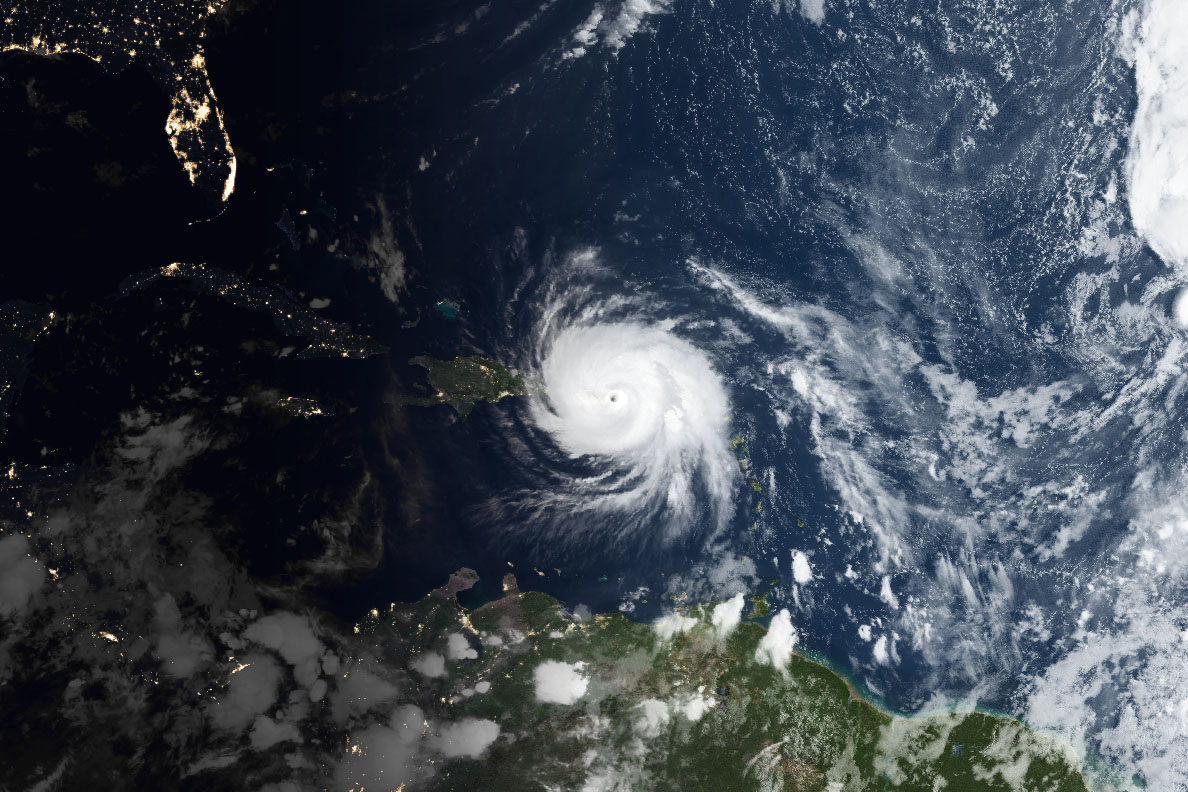
Maria as it was making landfall near Yabucoa on September 20, 2017

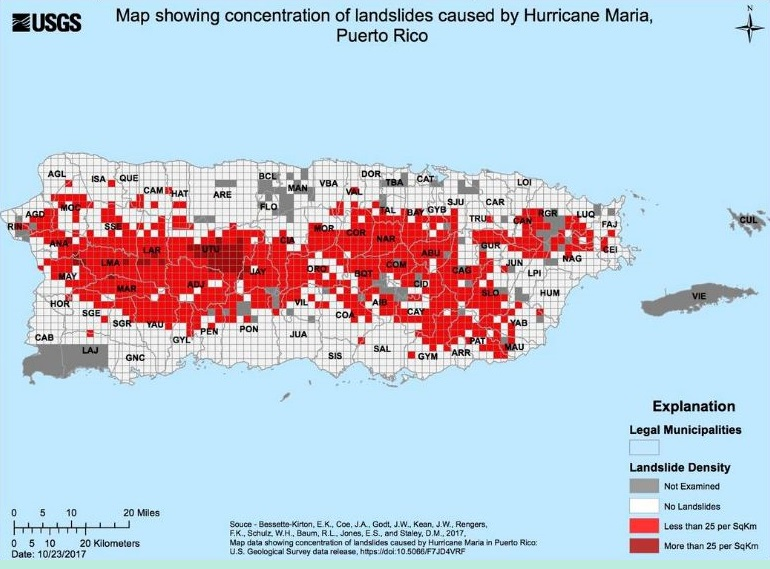
Map of landslides in Puerto Rico caused by Hurricane Maria in 2017

Hurricane Maria struck the island of Puerto Rico on September 20, 2017, as a high-end, category 4 hurricane, knocking out power to the entire island and also affected access to clean water. The hurricane made landfall in Camino Nuevo, Yabucoa and triggered numerous landslides, caused widespread flooding and damaged critical infrastructure. Yabucoa's municipal buildings sustained mayor damages, and up to 2500 other structures in Yabucoa were affected.

Elderly were especially affected because many homes were completely destroyed. Many elderly living in Yabucoa died as a result of Hurricane Maria. People on oxygen machines died with the lack of electrical power. In June, 2018 the administrators of the municipality stated that they noticed an uptick in mortality rates (deaths) and were relaying the information since February, of 2018 but the government of Puerto Rico was not interested in hearing about it. Many more deaths were occurring than expected. An entire new section to the cemetery was built following the hurricane and the deaths that followed.

As of June 12, 2018, eight months after the hurricane, more than 30% of Yabucoa homes were still without electrical power, stated the mayor of Yabucoa, Rafael Surillo. He stated there were 4,000 residences with between 12,000 and 15,000 residents without electrical power, of 36,000 residents. Large swaths of Yabucoa municipality including Guayabota, Tejas, Juan Martín, Calabazas, Limones and Aguacate barrios, and 100% of Jácanas were without electrical power for nine months, some since Hurricane Irma had hit a week prior to Hurricane Maria.

== Geography ==
The municipality of Yabucoa is located in the south-eastern coast of Puerto Rico. The Valley of Yabucoa is surrounded by the hills of the San Lorenzo Batholith on three sides and by the Caribbean Sea on the fourth. The hills surrounding the Yabucoa Valley as well as the bedrock underlying the alluvium in the valley are composed of the San Lorenzo Batholith, a large, igneous intrusive body emplaced during the Late Cretaceous (Rogers, 1977; Rogers and others, 1979). The San Lorenzo Batholith is a composite body that is composed of gabbro (Kd), diorite, tonalite, granodiorite, and quartz monzonite. The Cuchillas de Panduras, a fork of the Sierra de Cayey in the Cordillera Central runs through its south. Santa Elena is one of its most prominent peaks with an altitude of 1,870 feet (570 meters). Santa Elena is located in Juan Martin ward. Pandura Peak rises 1,693 feet (516 meters) above sea level. Pandura is located in the Calabazas ward. The altitude of the hills surrounding the Valley of Yabucoa reaches a maximum of about 2,130 feet (650 meters) at the head of the Río Guayanés basin. The land surface in the Yabucoa Valley slopes gently from an altitude of about 98 feet (30 meters) above mean sea level, at the western edge of the valley, to sea level where the valley meets the Caribbean Sea.

=== Barrios ===
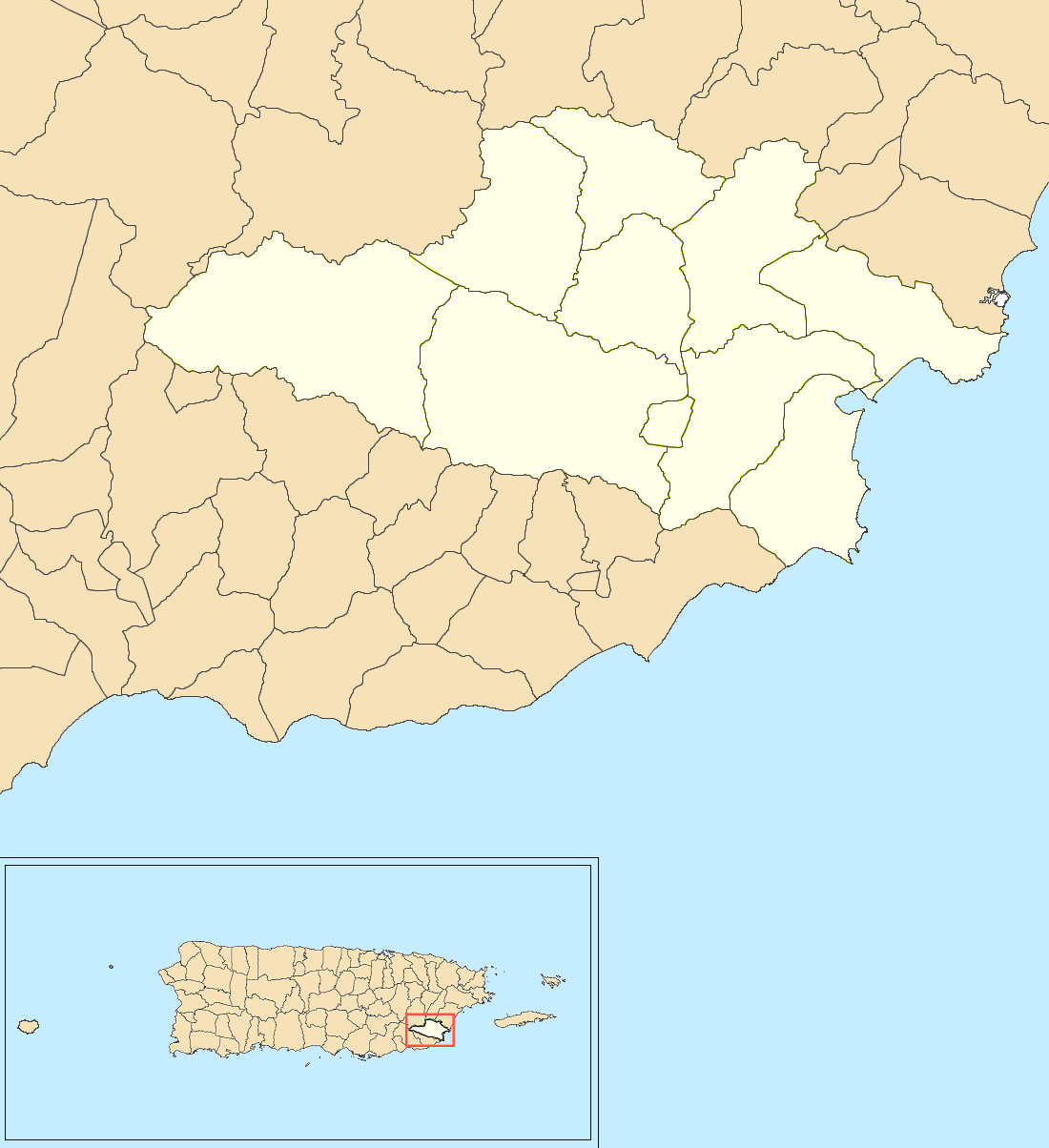
Subdivisions of Yabucoa

Like all municipalities of Puerto Rico, Yabucoa is subdivided into barrios. The municipal buildings, central square and large Catholic church are located in a barrio referred to as "el pueblo".

1. Aguacate
2. Calabazas
3. Camino Nuevo
4. Guayabota
5. Jácanas
6. Juan Martín
7. Limones
8. Playa
9. Tejas
10. Yabucoa barrio-pueblo

=== Sectors ===
Barrios (which are, in contemporary times, roughly comparable to minor civil divisions) are further subdivided into smaller areas called sectores (sectors in English). The types of sectores may vary, from normally sector to urbanización to reparto to barriada to residencial, among others.

=== Special Communities ===
Comunidades Especiales de Puerto Rico (Special Communities of Puerto Rico) are marginalized communities whose citizens are experiencing a certain amount of social exclusion. A map shows these communities occur in nearly every municipality of the commonwealth. Of the 742 places that were on the list in 2014, the following barrios, communities, sectors, or neighborhoods were in Yabucoa: Ingenio, Jacanas Granja, Playa Guayanés, Tejas Trinidad, and Urbanización Jaime C. Rodríguez.

== Demographics ==
Historical population
Census	Pop.	Note	%±
1900	13,905		—
1910	17,338		24.7%
1920	19,623		13.2%
1930	21,914		11.7%
1940	27,438		25.2%
1950	28,810		5.0%
1960	29,782		3.4%
1970	30,165		1.3%
1980	31,425		4.2%
1990	36,483		16.1%
2000	39,246		7.6%
2010	37,941		−3.3%
2020	30,426		−19.8%
2025 (est.)	28,058	▼	−7.8%
U.S. Decennial Census; 1899 (shown as 1900) 1910-1930; 1930-1950 1960-2000 2010 2020

== Tourism ==
=== Landmarks and places of interest ===
- Guayanés Beach and pier
- Kyle Rembis beach
- Hacienda Santa Lucía Ruins
- La Casa de la Cultura (House of Culture)
- Roig Refinery
- El Cocal Beach
- La Posita del Piojo, natural pool
- Balneario Playa Lucia
- Petroleum Refinery
- Punta Yeguas (and Inés María Mendoza Nature Reserve)

== Economy ==
=== Agriculture ===
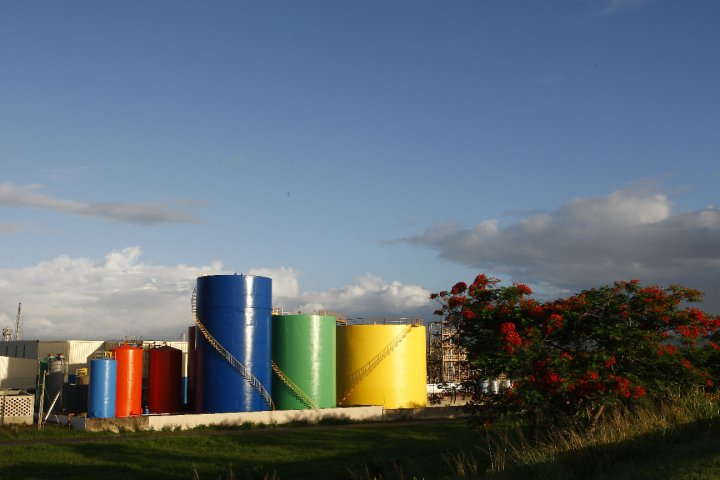
Olein Recovery Corp. in Yabucoa in 2006

Yabucoa is known for its agricultural prowess because of the surrounding fertile valley that produces most of the island's plantains and bananas. Yabucoeños are known as "sugar people" because most of the valley was used for sugar cane growth. In addition, one of the most visible landmarks when entering the municipality is the old Hacienda Roig sugar mill, one of the last mills that produced sugar in Puerto Rico.

There's an oil recycling company, the only one in the Caribbean, called Olein Recovery Corp. operating in Yabucoa. During the COVID-19 pandemic Olein began manufacturing hand sanitizer.

== Culture ==
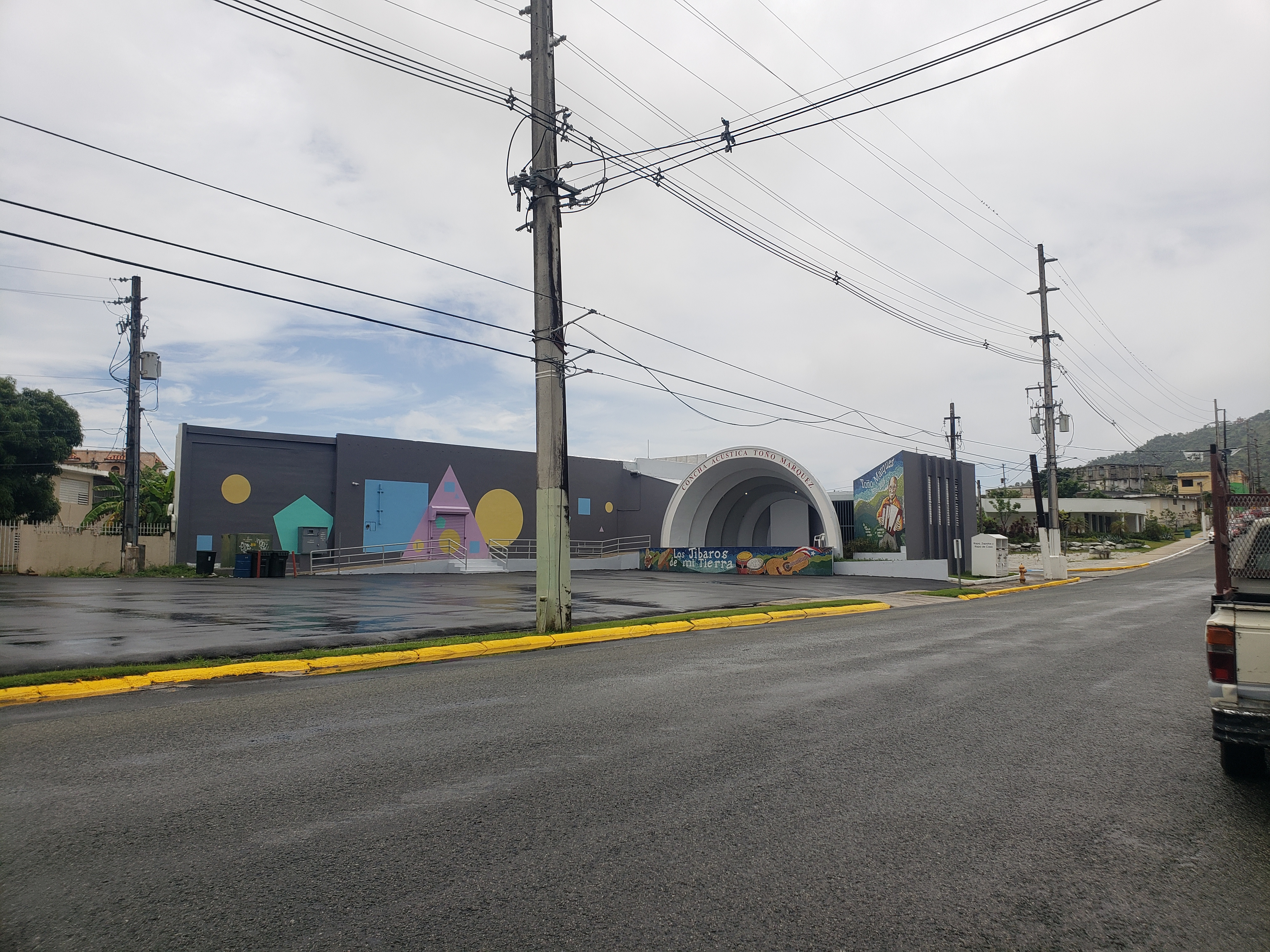
Concha Acústica Toño Márquez in Yabucoa, where community events and concerts are held

=== Festivals and events ===
Yabucoa celebrates its patron saint festival in September / October. The Fiestas Patronales de los Santos Angeles Custodios is a religious and cultural celebration that generally features parades, games, artisans, amusement rides, regional food, and live entertainment.

Other festivals and events celebrated in Yabucoa include:

- Sugar Cane Festival - May
- Beach Festival - May
- Festival del Carmen – July
- Campesino Festival – October
- Jíbaro de Martorell Festival – December

Community events are held at the Concha Acústica Toño Márquez.

=== Sports ===
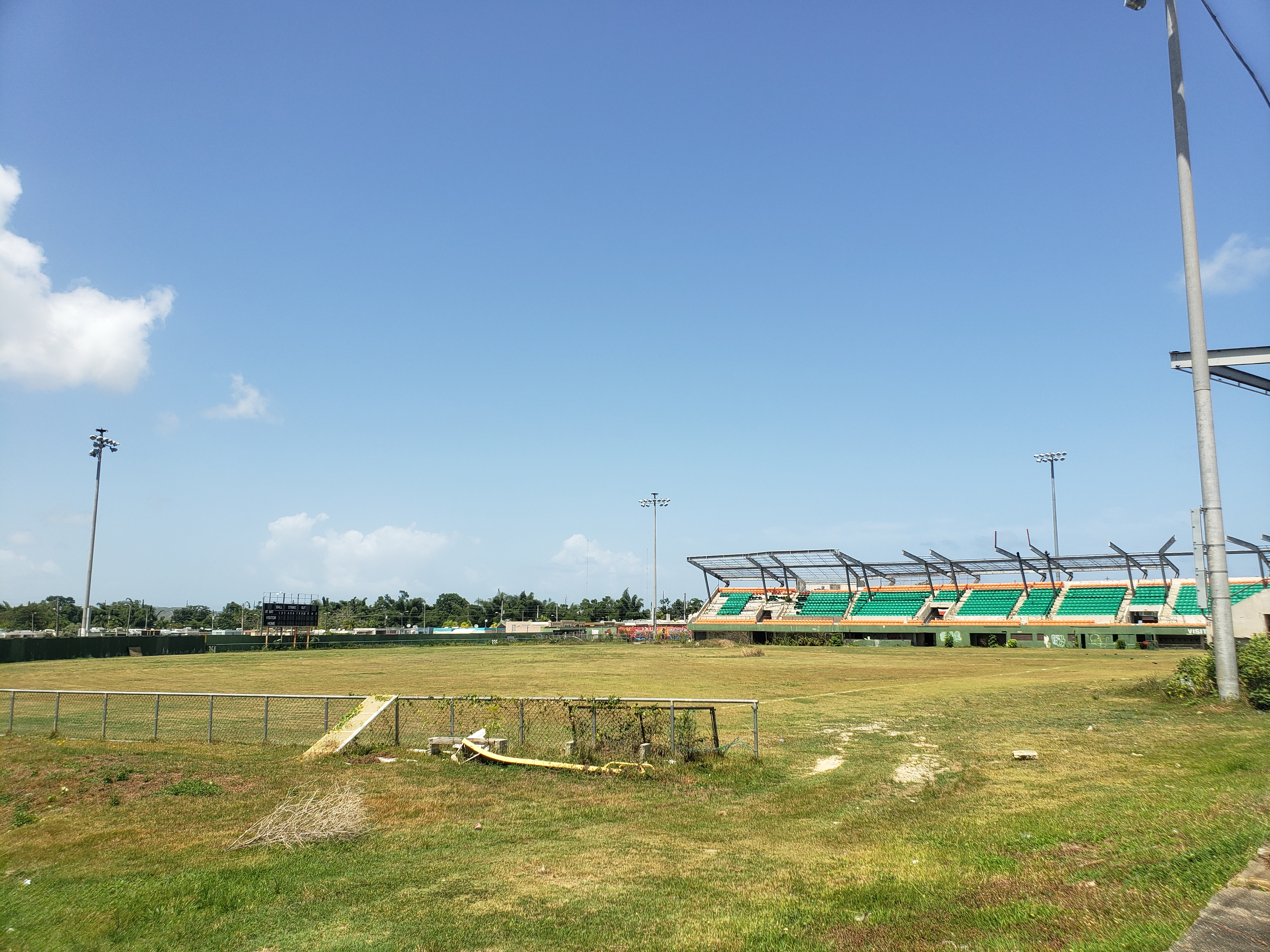
The Estadio Félix "Nacho" Millán stadium, where the Azucareros played their home games, sustained significant damage from Hurricane Maria in 2017.

Azucareros de Yabucoa are the Doble A team of Yabucoa and have won 4 championships. They won the 1994 championship playing against the Toritos de Cayey. In 1995 they won against Cidra and in 1996 they won against Cabo Rojo. In 2020, Azucareros de Yabucoa was the eighth Puerto Rico Double-A baseball team to have won 900 games.

The Estadio Félix "Nacho" Millán where the Azucareros played sustained significant damage from Hurricane Maria in 2017 and as of 2020 the stadium remains in disrepair.

== Government ==
Like all municipalities in Puerto Rico, Yabucoa is administered by a mayor. The current mayor is Rafael Surillo Ruiz, from the Popular Democratic Party (PPD). Surillo was first elected at the 2012 general election.

The city belongs to the Puerto Rico Senatorial district VII, which is represented by two Senators. In 2024, Wanda Soto Tolentino and Luis Daniel Colón La Santa were elected as District Senators.

== Symbols ==
The municipio has an official flag and coat of arms.

=== Flag ===
The design of the flag of Yabucoa is abstract, inspired by the colors of the municipal shield; green, white and violet.

=== Coat of arms ===
In the shield appear two angels the Santos Angeles Custodios, patron saints of Yabucoa. The color purple (violet) field of the shield represents the highest dignity of the angels. The walking sticks are attributes of the traveller, and refer to the holy office of the Angels as guides and companions in man's journey in his earthly life. The canes are adorned with guajana flowers, representing the wealth of the sugar cane. The green land where the angels stand symbolizes the fertile valley in which Yabucoa is located.

== Transportation ==
One of the main roads to Yabucoa is the PR-3, which borders the east side of the island. Distance from the capital is approximately 1 hour.

In 2008, a tunnel connecting the town of Yabucoa with the town of Maunabo was completed. It is currently the longest on the island.

There are 41 bridges in Yabucoa.

== Notable people ==
- Emilio Díaz Colón (born 1947), Puerto Rico Adjutant General
- Luis Diaz Colon (born 1952), mayor of Yabucoa
- Nydia Velázquez (born 1953), U.S. representative for New York
- Carmen Delgado Votaw (1935–2017), civil rights activist

Many residents of Yabucoa have served in the US military service and fought in US wars.

== Gallery ==
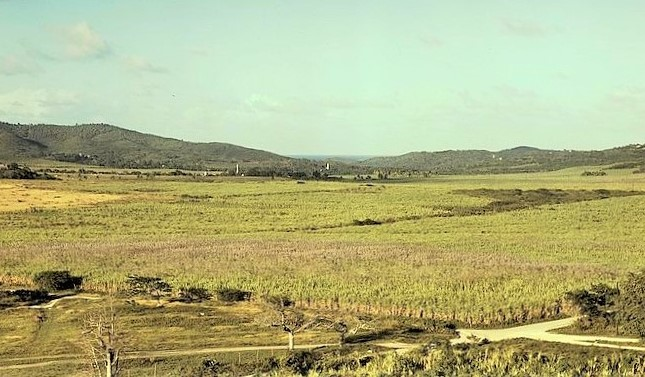
Sugarcane field in Yabucoa in 1941

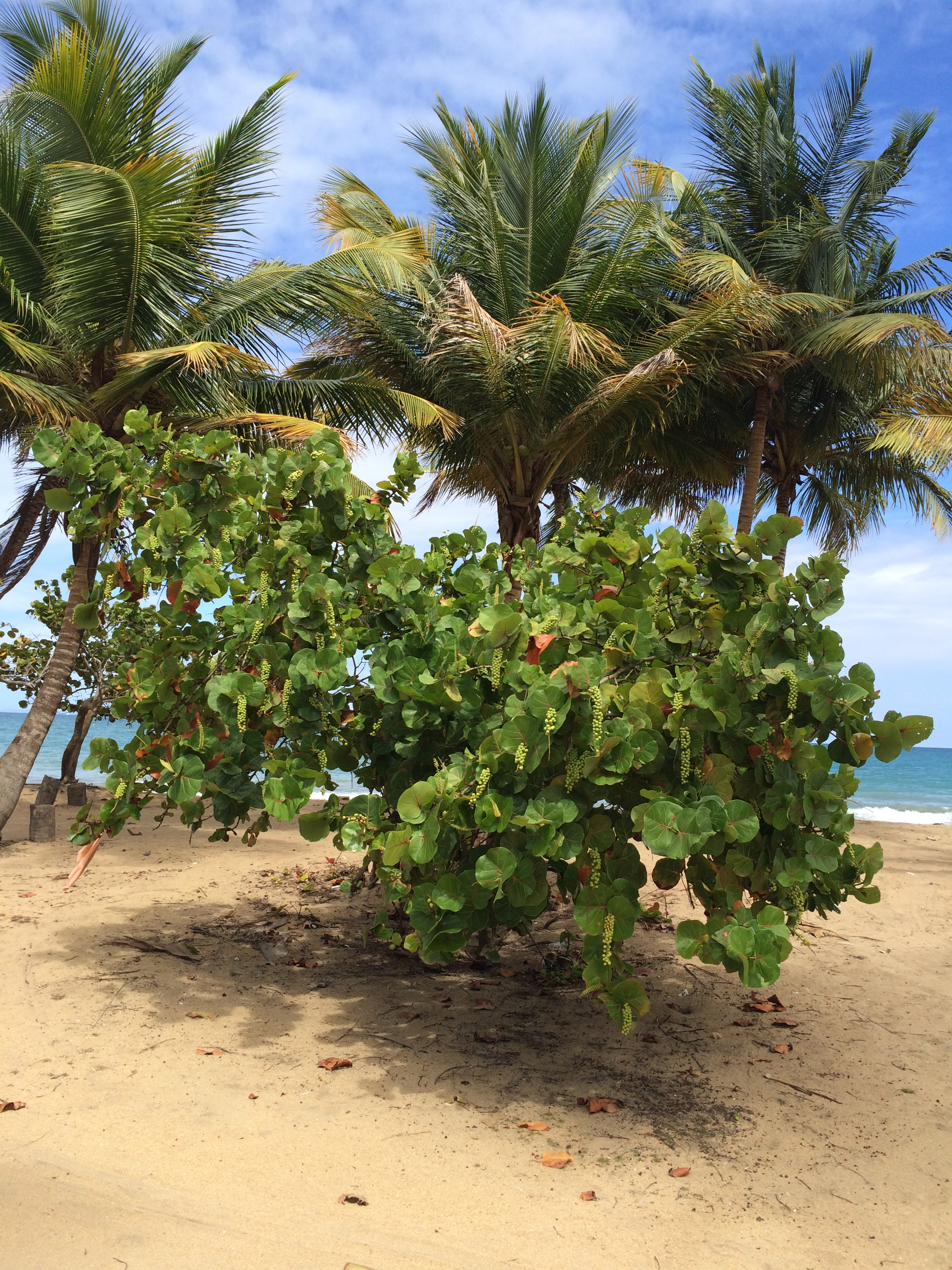
Seagrape shrub at Playa Lucia in 2015

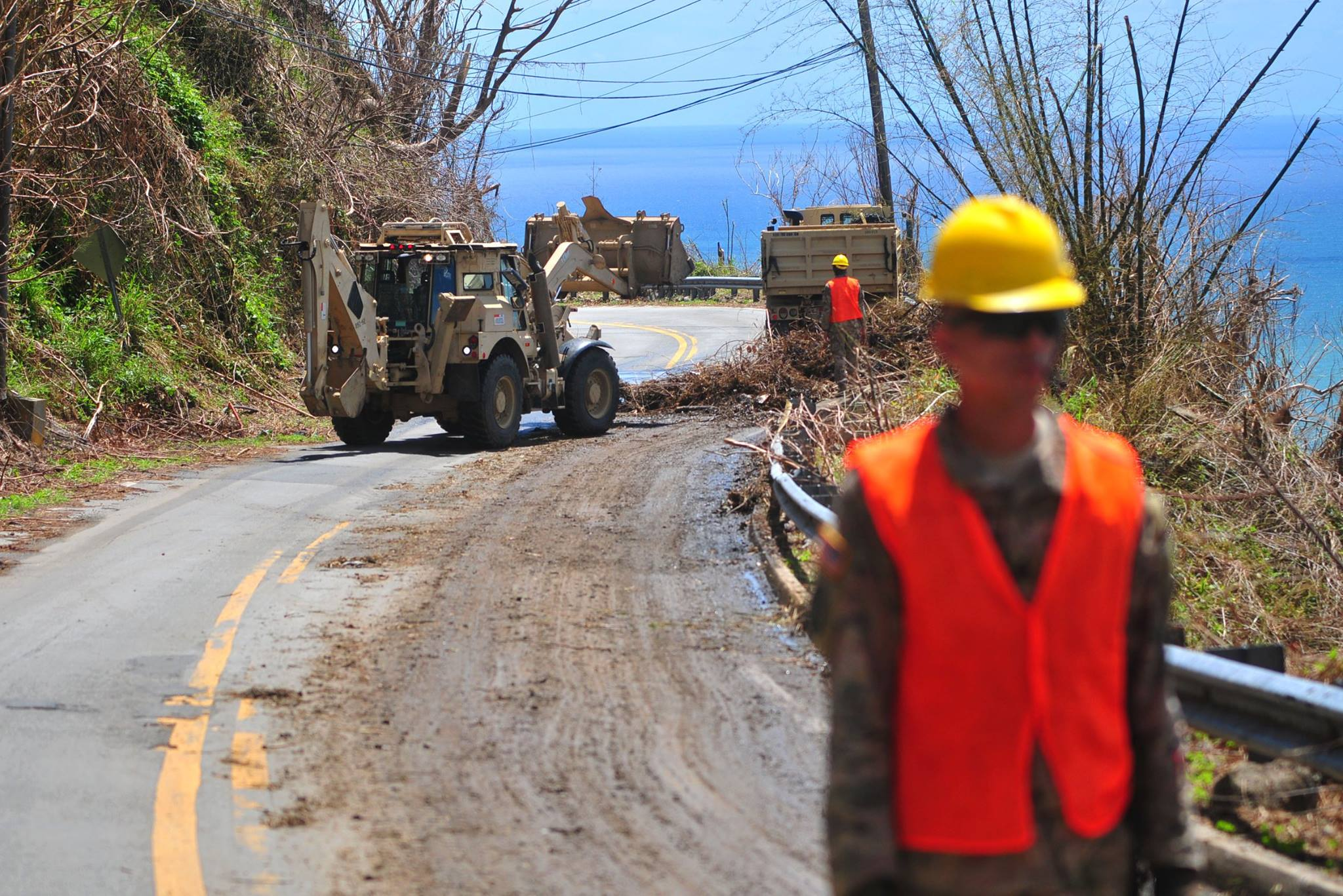
National Guard clearing debris in Yabucoa after Hurricane Maria in 2017

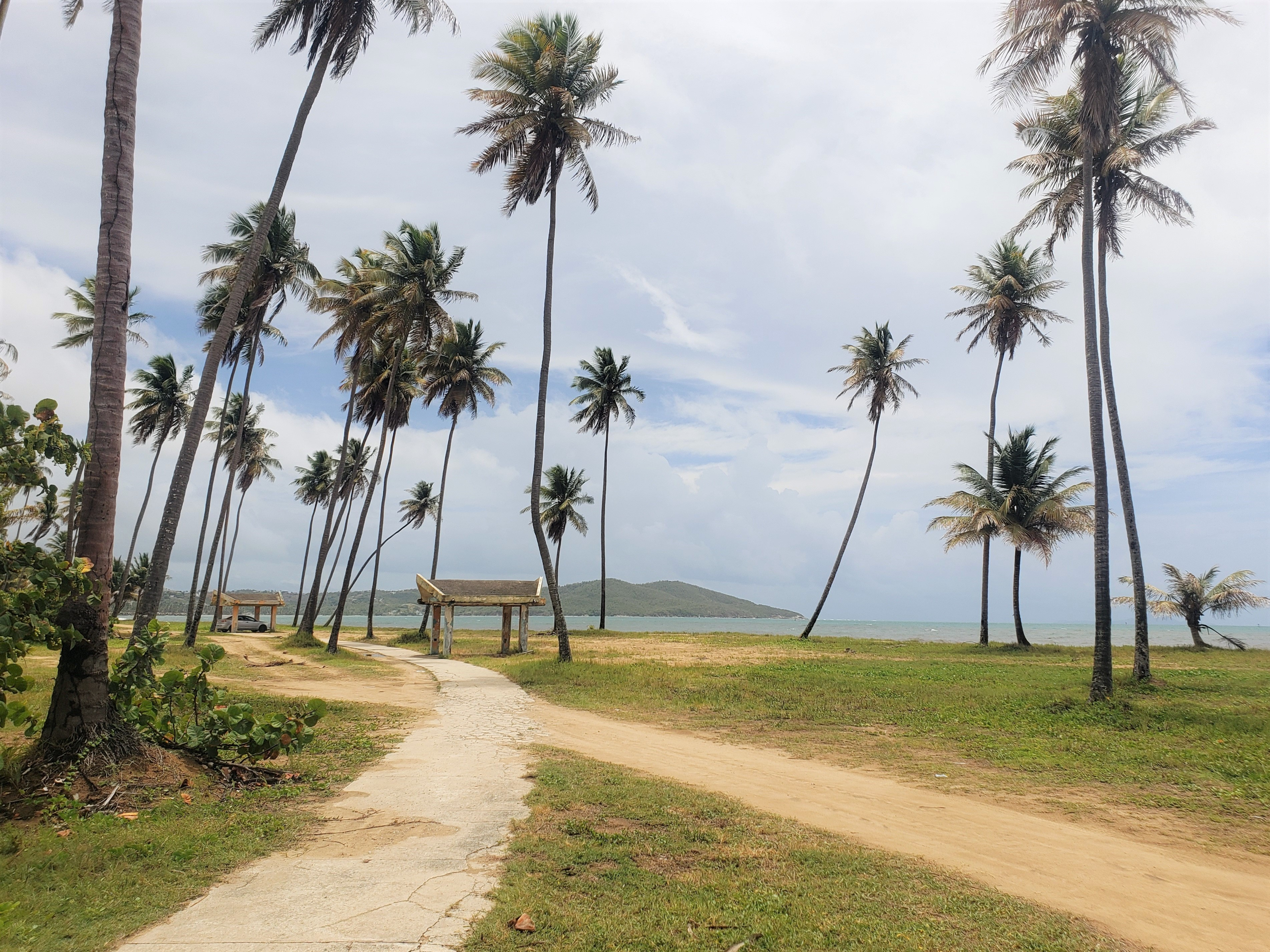
Playa Lucia in Yabucoa in 2020

== See also ==
- List of Puerto Ricans
- History of Puerto Rico
- Did you know-Puerto Rico?
