= Yabucoa barrio-pueblo =

Historical and administrative center (seat) of Yabucoa, Puerto Rico

Yabucoa barrio-pueblo Pueblo de Yabucoa
- Municipality Seat
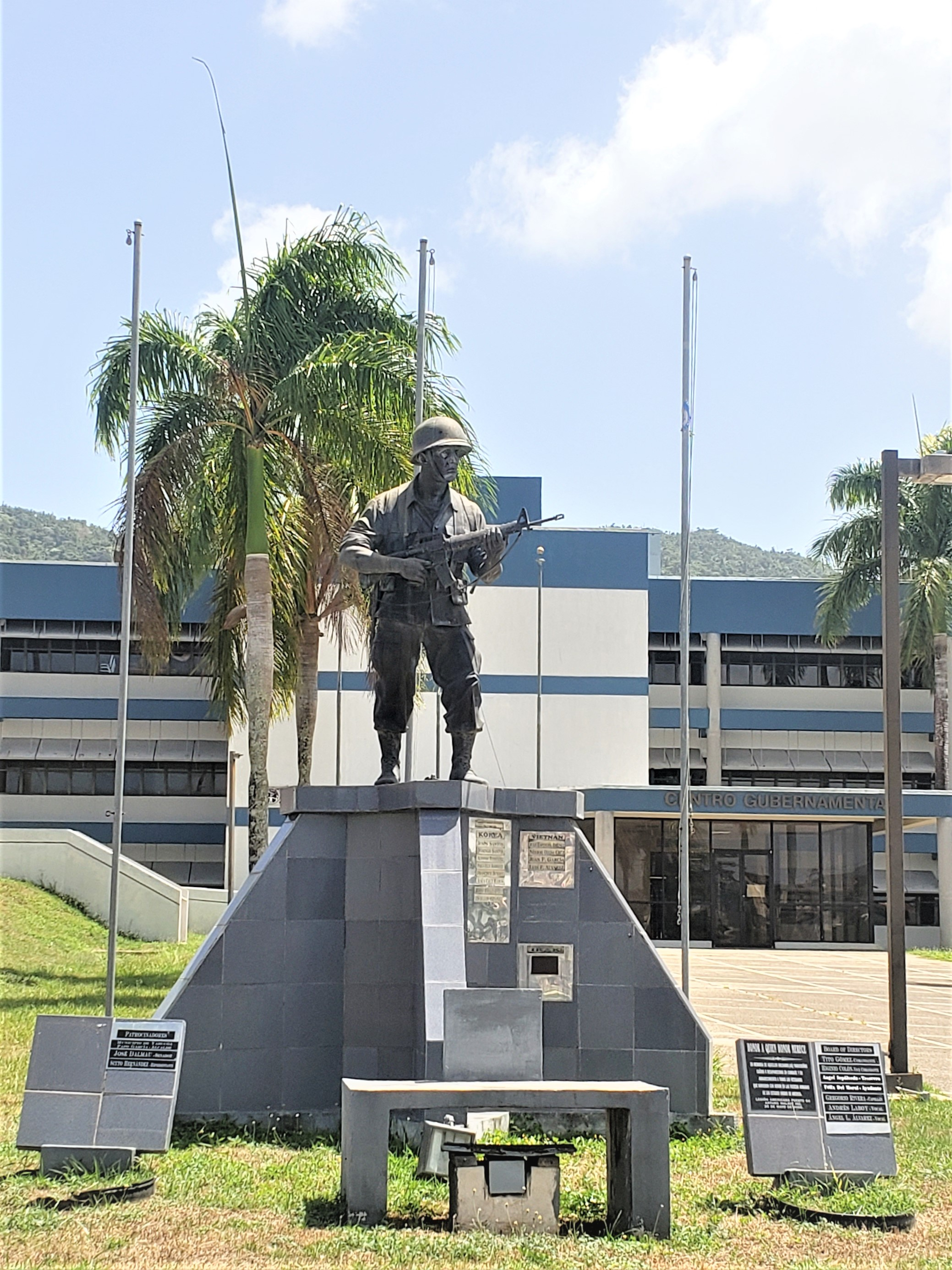
- Statue representing the Puerto Rican soldier who fought US wars in Vietnam and Korea

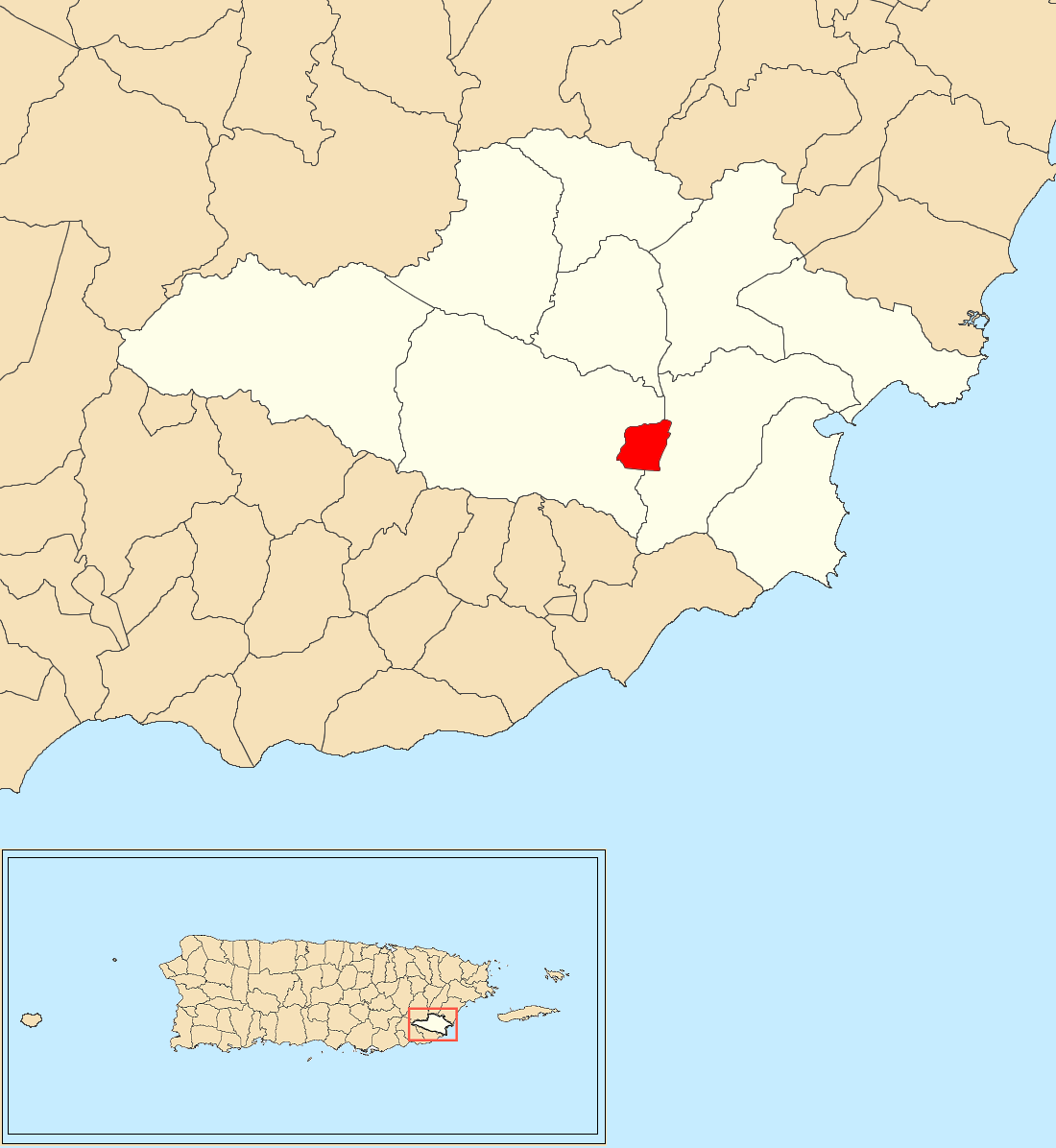
- Location of Yabucoa barrio-pueblo within the municipality of Yabucoa shown in red

- Location of Puerto Rico
- Coordinates: 18°02′50″N 65°52′48″W
- Commonwealth: Puerto Rico
- Municipality: Yabucoa

Area
  - Total: 0.52 sq mi (1.3 km^{2})
  - Land: 0.52 sq mi (1.3 km^{2})
  - Water: 0 sq mi (0 km^{2})
- Elevation: 79 ft (24 m)

Population (2010)
  - Total: 2,593
  - Density: 4,986.5/sq mi (1,925.3/km^{2})
- Source: 2010 Census
- Time zone: UTC−4 (AST)
- ZIP Code: 00767
- Area code: 787/939

Yabucoa barrio-pueblo is a barrio and the administrative center (seat) of Yabucoa, a municipality of Puerto Rico. Its population in 2010 was 2,593.

As was customary in Spain, in Puerto Rico, the municipality has a barrio called pueblo which contains a central plaza, the municipal buildings (city hall), and a Catholic church. Fiestas patronales (patron saint festivals) are held in the central plaza every year.

== The central plaza and its church ==
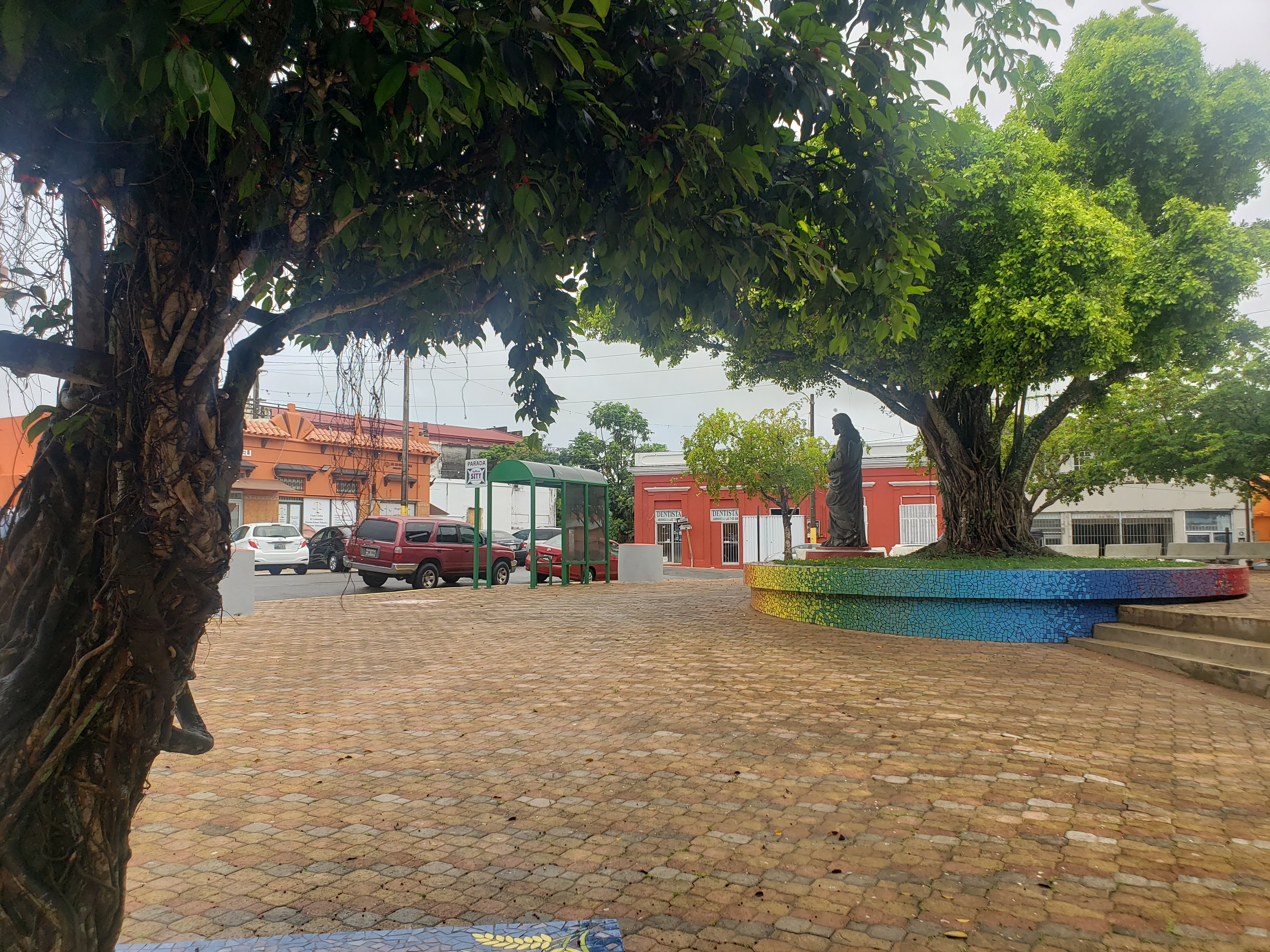
Central plaza (square) of Yabucoa in Yabucoa barrio-pueblo

The central plaza, or square, is a place for official and unofficial recreational events and a place where people can gather and socialize from dusk to dawn. The Laws of the Indies, Spanish law, which regulated life in Puerto Rico in the early 19th century, stated the plaza's purpose was for "the parties" (celebrations, festivities) (Spanish: a propósito para las fiestas), and that the square should be proportionally large enough for the number of neighbors (Spanish: grandeza proporcionada al número de vecinos). These Spanish regulations also stated that the streets nearby should be comfortable portals for passersby, protecting them from the elements: sun and rain.

Located across the central plaza in Yabucoa barrio-pueblo is the Parroquia Santos Ángeles Custodios, a Roman Catholic church. A wooden church was built across the plaza around 1790, which after many repairs was in disuse by 1880. In 1893, a new church was built and used even after it was damaged by Hurricane Santa Clara in 1956. In 1963, the damaged church was demolished and rebuilt in 1968. The current church is based on a design by architects Amaral and Morales.

== History ==
Yabucoa barrio-pueblo was in Spain's gazetteers until Puerto Rico was ceded by Spain in the aftermath of the Spanish–American War under the terms of the Treaty of Paris of 1898 and became an unincorporated territory of the United States. In 1899, the United States Department of War conducted a census of Puerto Rico finding that the population of Pueblo barrio was 1,838.

Historical population
Census	Pop.	Note	%±
1900	1,838		—
1910	2,816		53.2%
1920	2,888		2.6%
1930	3,841		33.0%
1940	4,542		18.3%
1950	5,258		15.8%
1960	3,734		−29.0%
1970	0		−100.0%
1980	3,510		—
1990	3,663		4.4%
2000	3,184		−13.1%
2010	2,593		−18.6%
U.S. Decennial Census; 1899 (shown as 1900) 1910-1930; 1930-1950 1980-2000 2010

== Sectors ==
Barrios (which are, in contemporary times, roughly comparable to minor civil divisions) in turn are further subdivided into smaller local populated place areas/units called sectores (sectors in English). The types of sectores may vary, from normally sector to urbanización to reparto to barriada to residencial, among others.

The following sectors are in Yabucoa barrio-pueblo:

Sector El Tosquero, Sector Poblado Calvario, Urbanización Francisco Sustache, Urbanización Jardines de Yabucoa, Urbanización Los Angeles, Urbanización Nueva, Urbanización Ramos Antonini, Urbanización Villa Recreo, and Urbanización Yabucoa Real.

== Gallery ==
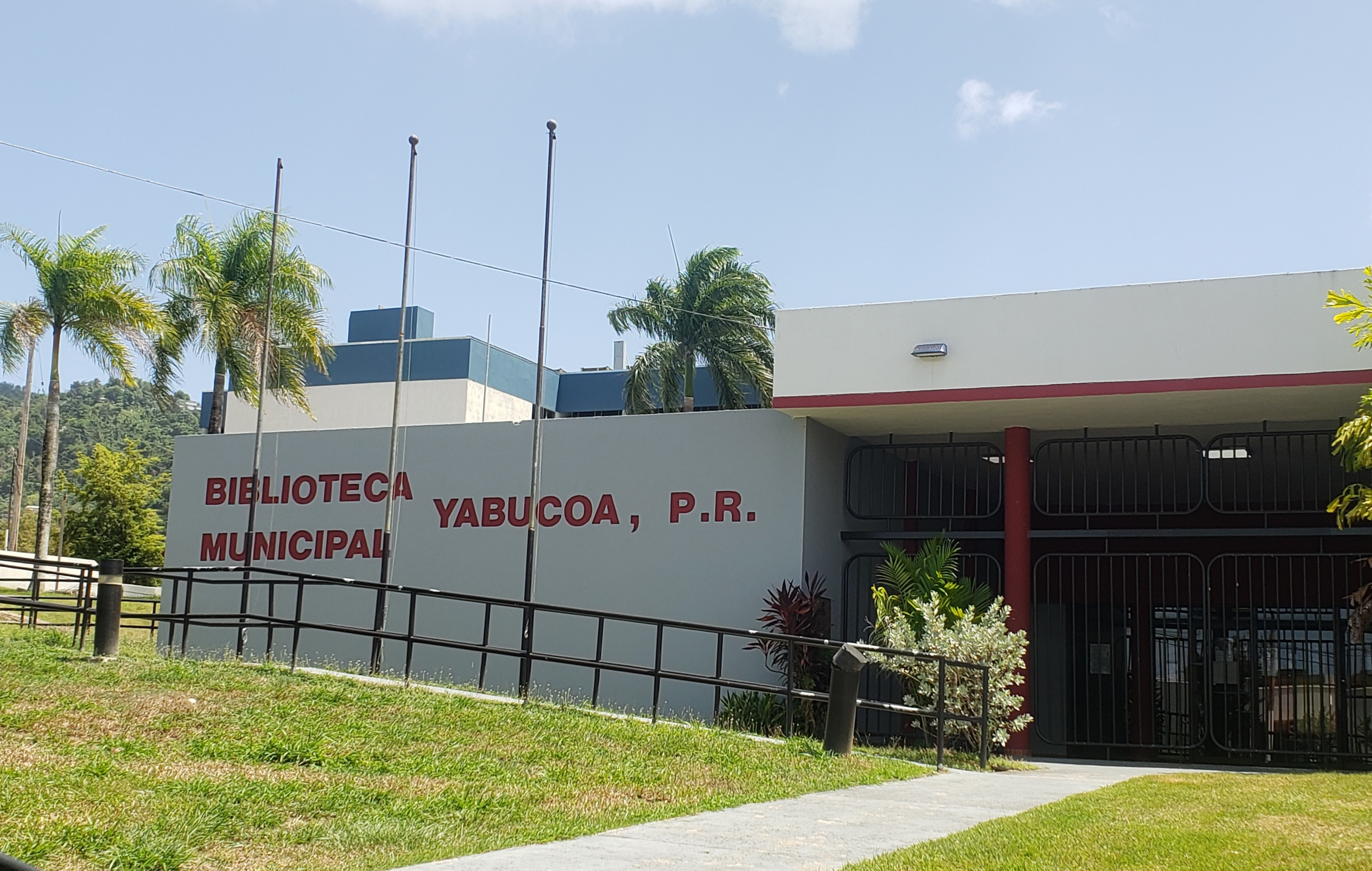
Municipal Library of Yabucoa

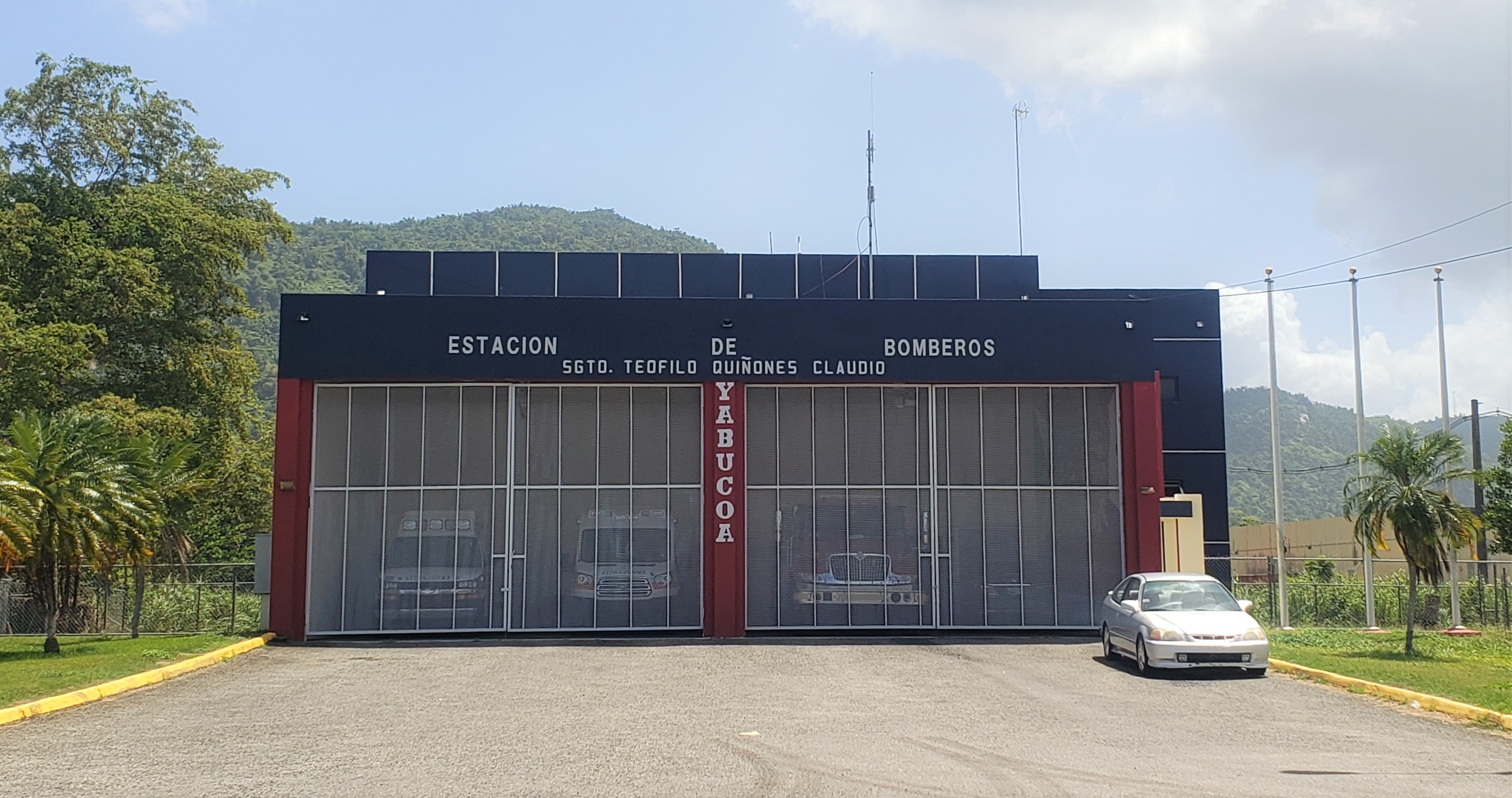
Sergeant Teófilo Quiñones Claudio Fire Station

== See also ==
- List of communities in Puerto Rico
- List of barrios and sectors of Yabucoa, Puerto Rico
