= Toledo, Paraná =

Toledo
- Municipality
- Municipality of Toledo
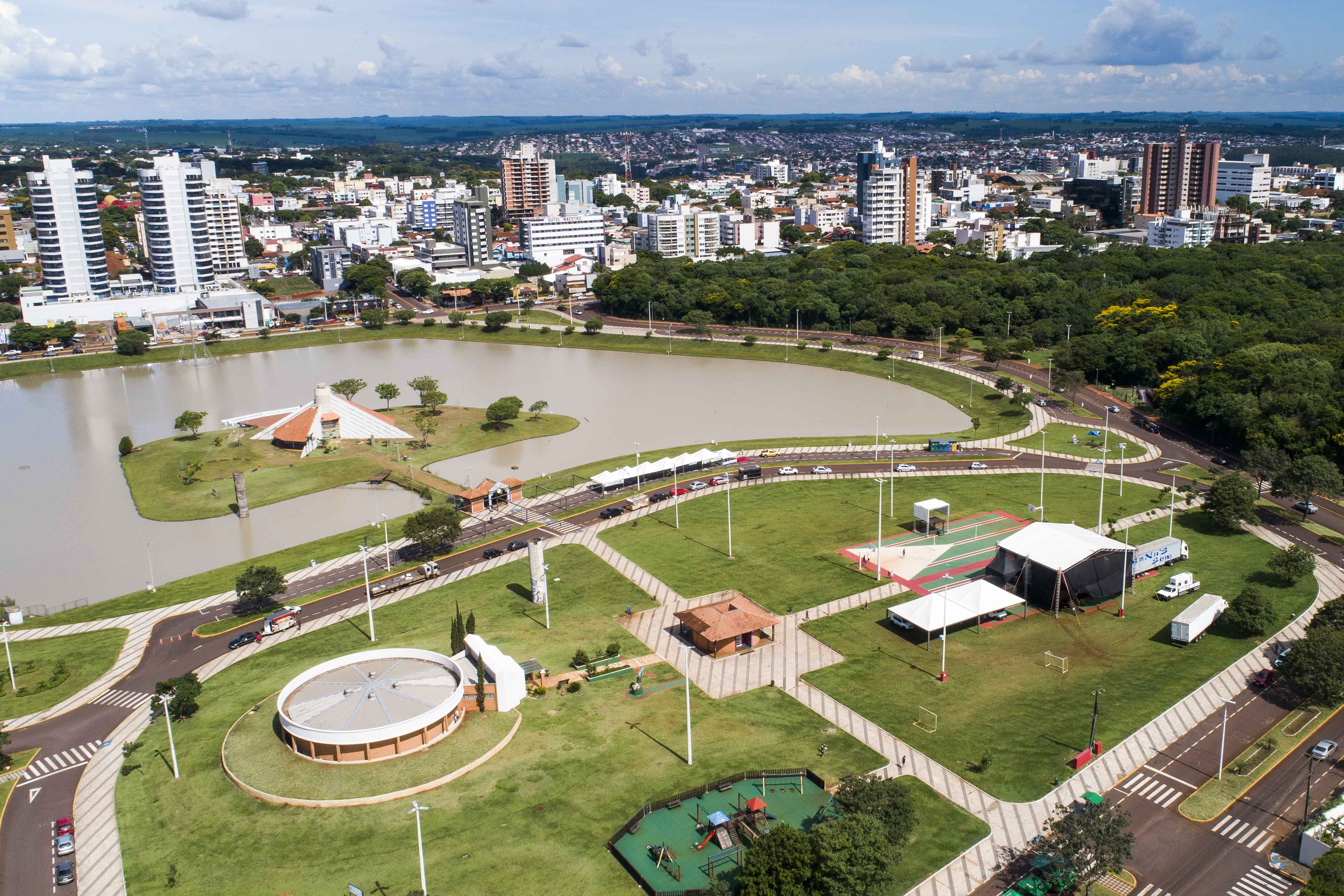
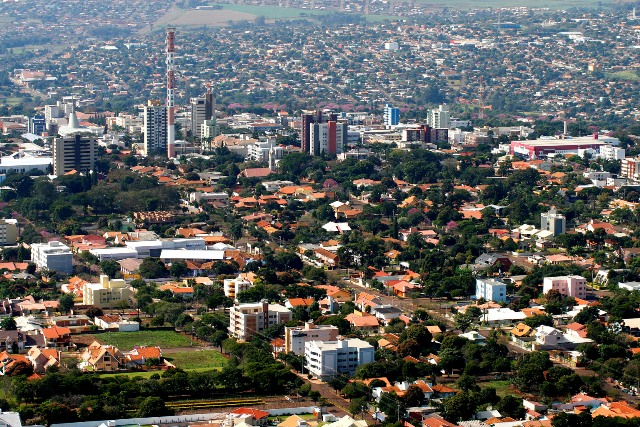
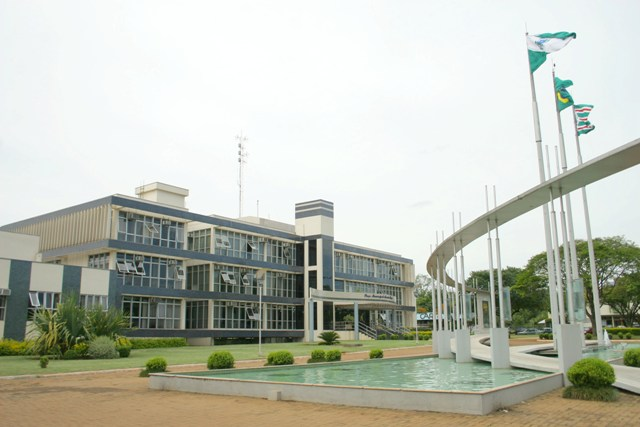
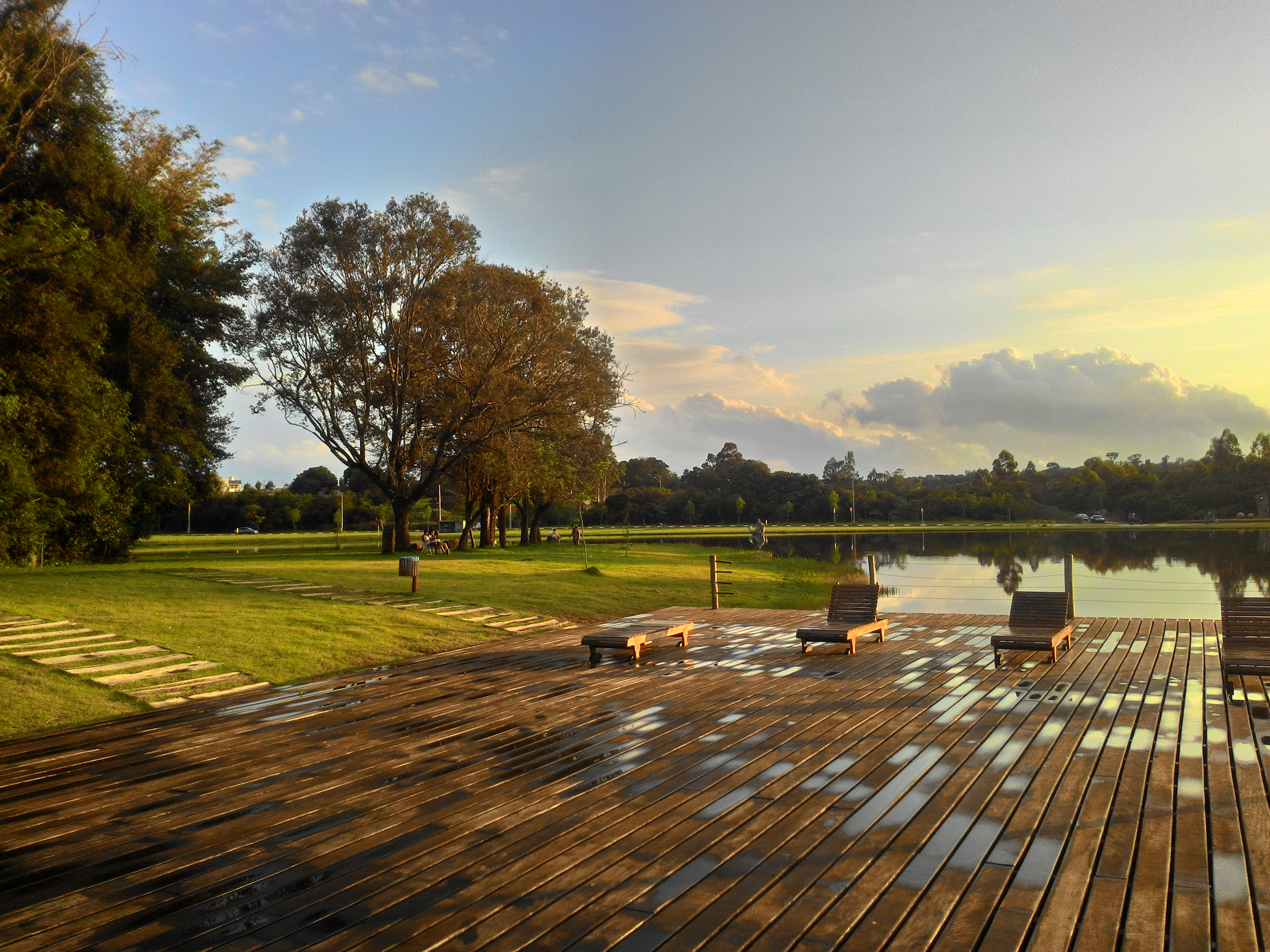
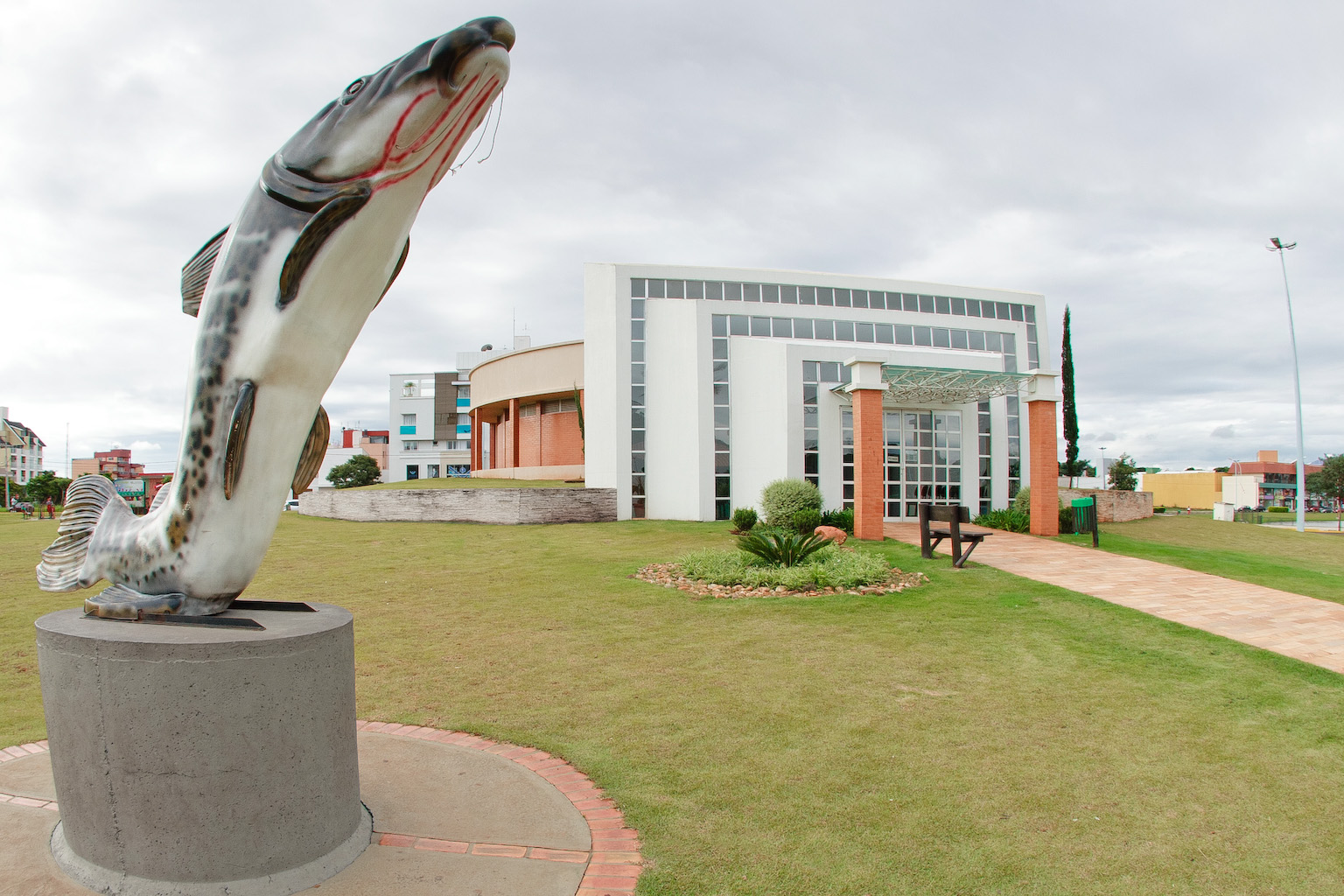
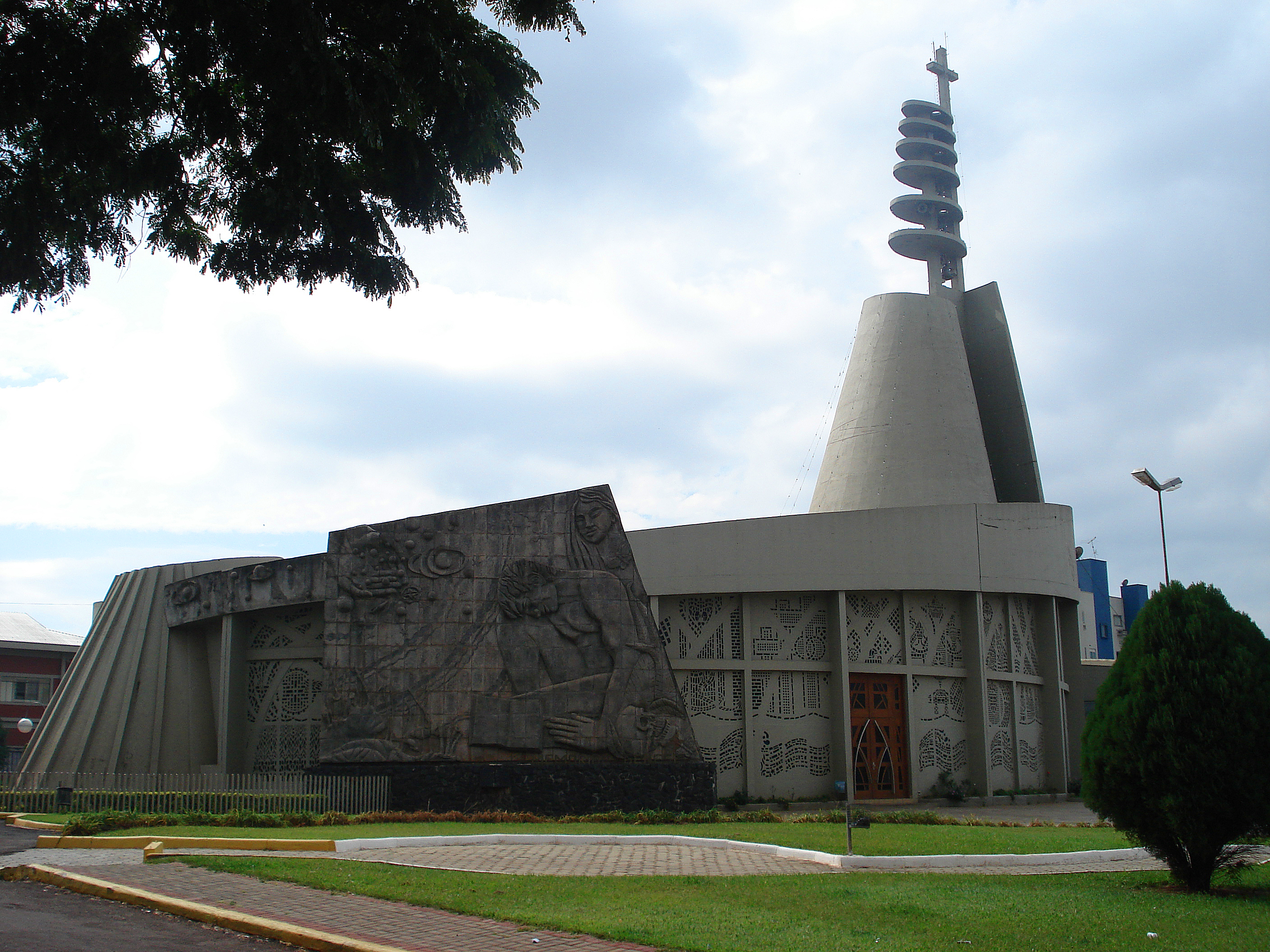

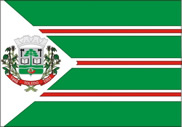
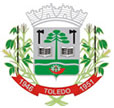
- Flag Coat of arms

- Location in Paraná

- Location in Brazil
- Coordinates: 24°42′50″S 53°44′34″W
- Country: Brazil
- Region: South
- State: Paraná
- Founded: 1951

Government
  - Mayor: Luis Adalberto Beto Lunitti Pagnussatt (MDB, (MDB)

Area
  - Total: 1,197.016 km^{2} (462.170 sq mi)
- Elevation: 550 m (1,800 ft)

Population (2022 Census)
  - Total: 150,470
  - Estimate (2025): 160,701
  - Density: 125.70/km^{2} (325.57/sq mi)
- Demonym: toledano
- Time zone: UTC−3 (BRT)
  - Summer (DST): UTC−2 (BRST)
- CEP: 85900-001
- Area code: +55 45
- HDI (2010): 0.768 – high
- Website: toledo.pr.gov.br

Toledo is a municipality in the Brazilian state of Paraná. It is located in the western region of the state, near Cascavel. As of 2022 Census, its population is 150,470 inhabitants.

The road distance to the state capital is 540 km.

== History ==
Toledo is located in a region of recent settlement, and received its first residents in 1946, Gaucho settlers from the city of San Marcos, then within Caxias do Sul, then for the Território Federal do Iguaçu. In 1951, the city was liberated from Foz do Iguaçu by Law No. 790, signed by the governor of Paraná Bento Munhoz da Rocha Neto.

The first election was held on November 9, 1952, and the official installation of December 14, 1952, when he saw the inauguration of Mayor Ernesto Dalloglio (1952/1956).

In the late 1960s, the region had only five counties: Foz do Iguaçu, Cascavel, Toledo, Guaíra and Guaraniaçu.

Toledo came when Industrial lumber mill and Colonization Rio Paraná S / A - Maripá acquired from a British real estate company a tract of land called Farm Britain, then started the occupation and clearing of bringing settlers to the area of Rio Grande do Sul.

The initial activity was the logging markets to meet the Argentina and Uruguay. The plan colonization was based on small farms averaging 10 acres in São Paulo.

Thereafter the development occurred rapidly, initially around the economics of farming communities, which lent the company a strong spirit herd.

In the late 1960s to 1970s the modernization of production printed new relationships and expertise in the field favored the monoculture and the concentration of ownership, causing the exodus and accelerated urbanization.

Pig farming, which was complementary activity to the pioneers, developed rapidly in the 1950s, culminating with the founding of the Pioneer Refrigerated S / A, which had its controlling interest acquired by the company Sadia in the year of 1964, which came to implement the system integration in the areas of poultry and pork, and a manufacturing facility that has installed the largest industry in the city. Initially Frigobrás worked through, but after the merger of the Sadia SA, the purchasing department was transferred to another location. More recently the merger between Sadia and Perdigao, Current BRF, led to the transfer of the administration to Curitiba, but the factory complex remains inalteraldo, with about 7000 workers, whose production meets the domestic and foreign markets. In the 90 Sadia started to invest in the expansion of pig and Toledo area expanded their flock of 100,000 to more than 400 thousand heads.

== Education ==
The municipal education stands out in Paraná. The Development Index IDEB (Basic Education), which is evaluated every two years, has the rate of 6.7 in the city, above the national rate

=== Higher education ===
- Universidade Federal do Paraná (Federal University of Paraná) (UFPR)
- Universidade Tecnológica Federal do Paraná (Federal Technological University of Paraná) (UTFPR)
- Universidade Estadual do Oeste do Paraná (State University of West of Paraná) (UNIOESTE)
- Pontifícia Universidade Católica do Paraná (Pontifical Catholic University of Paraná) (PUC-PR)
- Universidade Paranaense (University of Paraná) (UNIPAR)
- Centro Universitário Fundação Assis Gurgacz (University Assis Gurgacz) (FAG)
- Faculdade das Industrias (University of Industries) (SENAI)
- Universidade Norte do Paraná (University North of Paraná) (UNOPAR)

== Geography ==
The city of Toledo is located in Western Paraná, bordering:

- North: Maripá and Nova Santa Rosa;
- South: Santa Tereza do Oeste and São Pedro do Iguaçu;
- East: Assis Chateaubriand, Tupãssi and Cascavel;
- West: Quatro Pontes, Marechal Cândido Rondon and Ouro Verde do Oeste.

=== Hydrography ===
Major rivers, and creek that sanghas cuts the city of Toledo are:

- Rio Toledo - Tanks nearly all regions of the municipality;
- Rio São Francisco - It has a hydroelectric power plant in operation and another off;
- Sanga Panambi - With spring in the Garden City, supplies Lake City;
- Arroio Marreco - Old Point leisure, rural property and some supplies New Lake.

=== Climate ===
Climate data for Toledo, Paraná
Month	Jan	Feb	Mar	Apr	May	Jun	Jul	Aug	Sep	Oct	Nov	Dec	Year
Mean daily maximum °C (°F)	29.9 (85.8)	29.7 (85.5)	29.4 (84.9)	26.7 (80.1)	23.4 (74.1)	21.1 (70.0)	22.8 (73.0)	23.2 (73.8)	24.6 (76.3)	27.5 (81.5)	28.4 (83.1)	28.8 (83.8)	26.3 (79.3)
Daily mean °C (°F)	24.4 (75.9)	24.0 (75.2)	23.4 (74.1)	20.7 (69.3)	17.7 (63.9)	15.7 (60.3)	17.1 (62.8)	17.1 (62.8)	18.9 (66.0)	21.6 (70.9)	22.7 (72.9)	23.4 (74.1)	20.6 (69.0)
Mean daily minimum °C (°F)	19.6 (67.3)	19.4 (66.9)	18.5 (65.3)	15.8 (60.4)	12.9 (55.2)	11.4 (52.5)	12.5 (54.5)	12.6 (54.7)	14.0 (57.2)	16.5 (61.7)	17.7 (63.9)	19.0 (66.2)	15.8 (60.5)
Average precipitation mm (inches)	177 (7.0)	170 (6.7)	132 (5.2)	128 (5.0)	158 (6.2)	138 (5.4)	109 (4.3)	93 (3.7)	151 (5.9)	205 (8.1)	159 (6.3)	185 (7.3)	1,805 (71.1)
Source 1: INMET(temperatures 1961-1990)
Source 2: Climatempo(precipitation)

== Numbers of the city ==
- 23rd place in the ranking of Best Cities in Brazil, according to Istoé / Austin Rating.
- 49th place among the top 100 municipalities in Brazil to invest, according to Exame magazine.
- 94,688 vehicles
- 10th place in the state and 91st national in the ranking of development according to IFDM-FIRJAN.
- 3rd place in the human development index (IDH) among the 10 largest cities in Parana.
- 1 freshwater aquarium in the southern region.
- 9th place in the collected tax on movement of goods and services (ICMS) of Paraná.
- 10th in gross domestic product (GDP) total of Parana.
- 1st place in the industrial park in western Paraná.
- 1 in the agricultural GDP of Parana and the southern region and 11th in the country.
- 1 in the VBP Paraná reaching 1 billion.
- 3rd place in value added of agriculture in Brazil.
- 1 in the swine herd of Parana.
- 1 in the flock of chickens Paraná.
- 3rd largest milk producer in Paraná, producing 70 million liters / year.
- 1 in fish farming in Paraná.
- Owned by several years the largest refrigerated poultry in Latin America, with capacity to slaughter 360,000 birds / day.

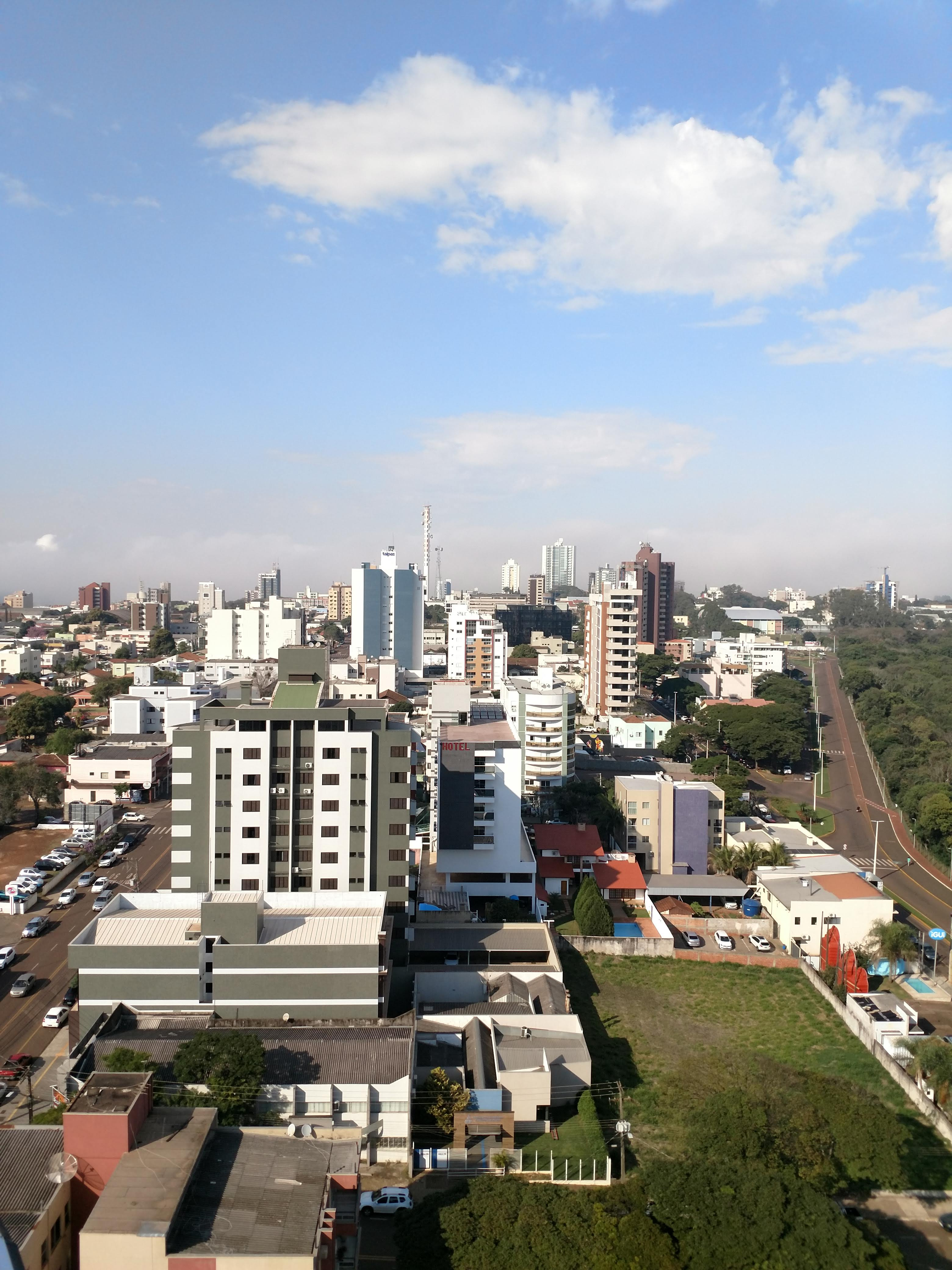
Downtown Toledo

=== Evolution of the population of Toledo ===
Year	Population	Percent Change
1950	615 inhabitants	
1960	24,959 inhabitants	3,958.37%
1970	68,885 inhabitants	175.99%
1980	81,282 inhabitants	17.99%
1991	94,879 inhabitants	16.72%
2000	98,200 inhabitants	3.50%
2010	119,313 inhabitants	21.50%
2016	133,824 inhabitants	12.16% *
2022	150,470 inhabitants	12.44%

- * Variation in the last six years, according to IBGE estimates.

=== Demographics ===
According to the IBGE, the population of Toledo is formed of the following ethnicities.

Ethnicity	Percentage
White	76%
Brown	21%
Black	3%

Source: Instituto Paranaense de Desenvolvimento Econômico e Social

== Media ==
=== Television ===
- RPC TV (Cascavel) (Globo) - Streaming digital (HDTV)
- TV Naipi (SBT) - Streaming digital (HDTV)
- RIC TV Toledo (Rede Record) - Streaming digital (HDTV)
- Rede Vida - Streaming digital (HDTV)
- CATVE (TV Cultura)
- TV Tarobá Cascavel (Band) - Streaming digital (HDTV)

== Transportation ==
=== Road ===
- BR-467 Excerpt Toledo - Cascavel (Highway José Neves Formighieri)
- PR-182 Excerpt Toledo - Palotina (Highway Alberto Dalcanale)
- PR-317 Excerpt Toledo - Santa Helena (Highway Dr. Ivo Rocha)
- PR-585 Excerpt Toledo - São Pedro do Iguaçu (Highway Egon Pudell)
- BR-163 Excerpt Toledo - Quatro Pontes (Highway Ernesto Dalloglio)
- PR-486 Excerpt Toledo - Assis Chateaubriand (Highway Moacir Micheletto)

=== Air ===
Toledo has the Aeroporto Luiz Dalcanalle Filho, which operates by instruments and night flights. Projects of federal and state governments indicate that, in 10 years, western Paraná will have a large airport with passenger and cargo flights.

The restructuring aimed to implement commercial flights, which began on January 9, 2019, with Azul Linhas Aéreas' commercial operations at Afonso Pena Airport in the Curitiba Metropolitan Region. However, in March 2020, flights were canceled due to the COVID-19 pandemic.

In late 2021, the company resumed operations with five weekly flights to Campinas, but in December 2023, it transferred these flights to Cascavel Airport, closing its base in Toledo.

=== Rail ===
There are studies that Toledo count on the extent of Ferroeste - Ferrovia Paraná Oeste, which will join the city to the Brazilian railway network.

== Subdivisions ==
The city has 23 districts:

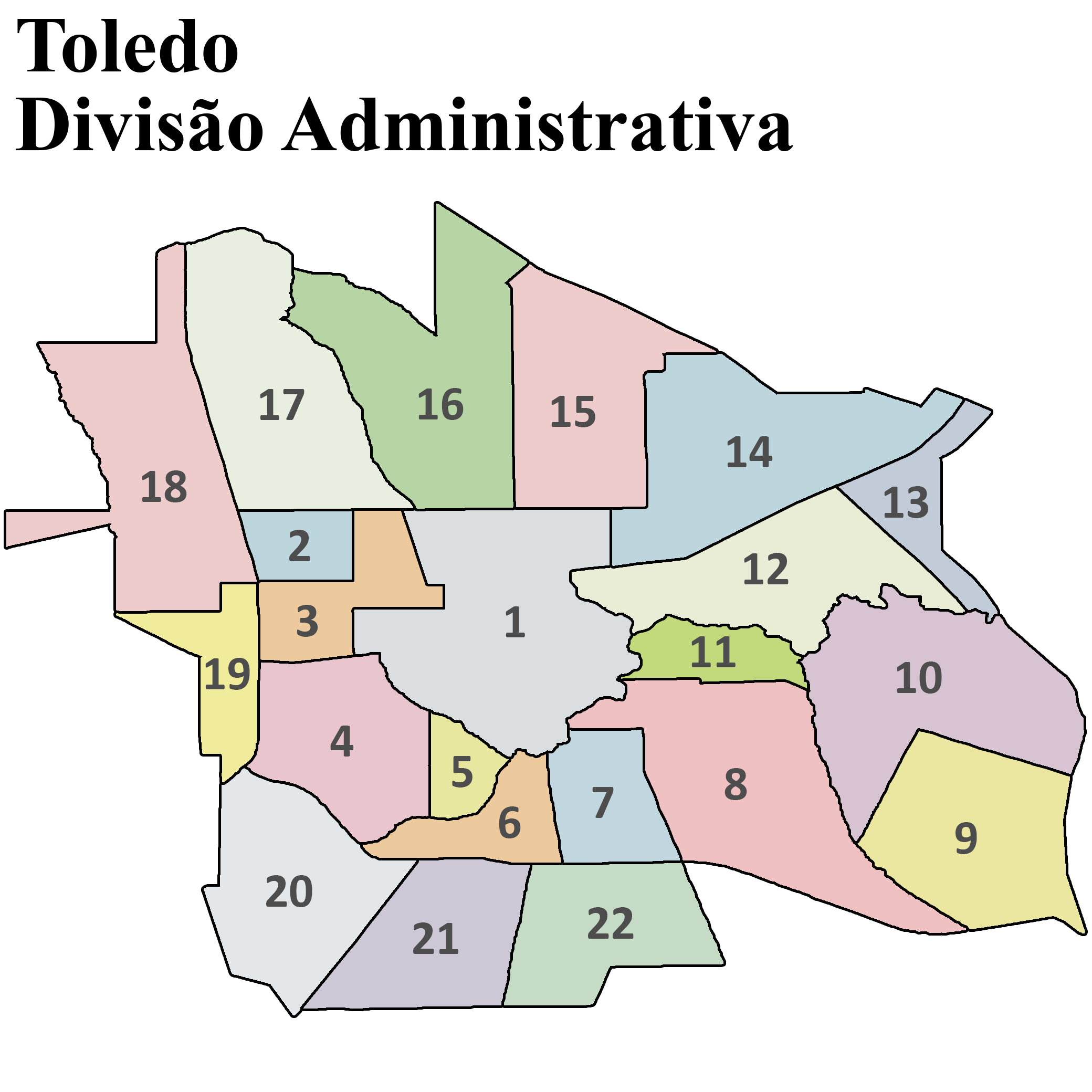
Administrative division

Position	District	Population	Density (inhabitants/km^{2})
1	Downtown	11695	3039.39
2	Santa Maria Garden	2555	4010.12
3	La Salle Garden	2311	1992.74
4	Pancera Garden	3227	1565.23
5	Parizotto Garden	943	1950.86
6	Bressan Garden	3105	3430.72
7	Sadia	0	0
8	Pioneiro Village	17340	5116.56
9	Pinheirinho	550	191.52
10	Europa/América Garden	11704	3438.48
11	Operária Village	2550	3373.33
12	Concórdia Garden	4381	1594.1
13	Independência Garden	459	1192.92
14	Porto Alegre Garden	4987	1510.77
15	Gisela Garden	6588	2599.79
16	Industrial Village	6392	1250.47
17	Tocantins	1163	389.68
18	Coopagro Garden	8447	2265.89
19	Becker Village	1108	1052.06
20	Cerâmica Prata	32	123.94
21	São Francisco	5665	2700.28
22	Panorama Garden	7974	4207.71
23	Panorama Garden II	****	****
24	Cristo Rei	****	****
25	Usina	****	****
26	Biopark	****	****

Besides this, there are 10 district:

Position	District	Population	Density (inhabitants/km^{2})
1	Bom Princípio do Oeste	*	**
2	Concórdia do Oeste	1022	25.27
3	Dez de Maio	1619	15.95
4	Dois Irmãos	763	17.37
5	Novo Sarandi	2632	30.89
6	Novo Sobradinho	887	22.51
7	São Luiz do Oeste	742	15.1
8	São Miguel	467	10.6
9	Vila Ipiranga	544	18.17
10	Vila Nova	2188	28.2

- (source: Law 1941 December 27, 2006)
- * ** (source: Law 2016 June 23, 2016 )

== Main Avenues and Streets of Toledo ==
1. Parigot de Souza Avenue
2. Maripá Avenue
3. J.J. Muraro Avenue
4. Ministro Cirne Lima Avenue
5. Senador Attílio Fontana Avenue
6. Egydio Geronymo Munaretto Avenue
7. Nossa Senhora de Fátima Avenue
8. Tiradentes Avenue
9. Primeiro de Maio Street
10. Barão do Rio Branco Street
11. São João Street
12. Santos Dumont Street
13. São Vicente de Paulo Square

== Administration ==
=== Mayors ===
- Ernesto Elger (1952-1956) - 1st Mayor;
- Pudell Egon (1956-1960);
- Willy Barth (1960-1962) - died on April 2, 1962;
- Ernesto Elger (1962-1964) - Elected to replace Willy Barth;
- Avelino Campagnolo (1964-1969);
- Pudell Egon (1969-1973);
- Wilson Charles Kuhn (1973-1977);
- Duílio Genari (1977-1983); - Arnoldo Bohnen as interim May 1982 to January 1983
- Albino Corazza Neto (1983-1989);
- Luiz Alberto de Araújo (1989-1992);
- Albino Corazza Neto (1993-1996);
- Antonio Derli Donin (1997/2000);
- Antonio Derli Donin (2000-2004) - Re-elected;
- Jose Carlos Schiavinato (2005-2008)
- Jose Carlos Schiavinato (2009-2012) - Reelected;
- Luis Adalberto Beto Lunitti Pagnussatt (2013-2016)
- Lucio de Marchi (2017-2020)
- Luis Adalberto Beto Lunitti Pagnussatt (2021-2024)

=== Political representation ===
- Congressman Dilceu Sperafico (PP)
- State Representative Jose Carlos Schiavinato (PP)

== Tourism ==
The city of Toledo is preparing for the "Industry of the Third Millennium", with several options for tourism, leisure, gastronomy, culture, sport and business events.

It has natural beauty, such as jumps, waterfalls, ecological trails in the São Francisco River, with emphasis on the Ecological Park Diva Paim Barth, fully central region, with a lake, forest and other attractions that make it a meeting point of the population.

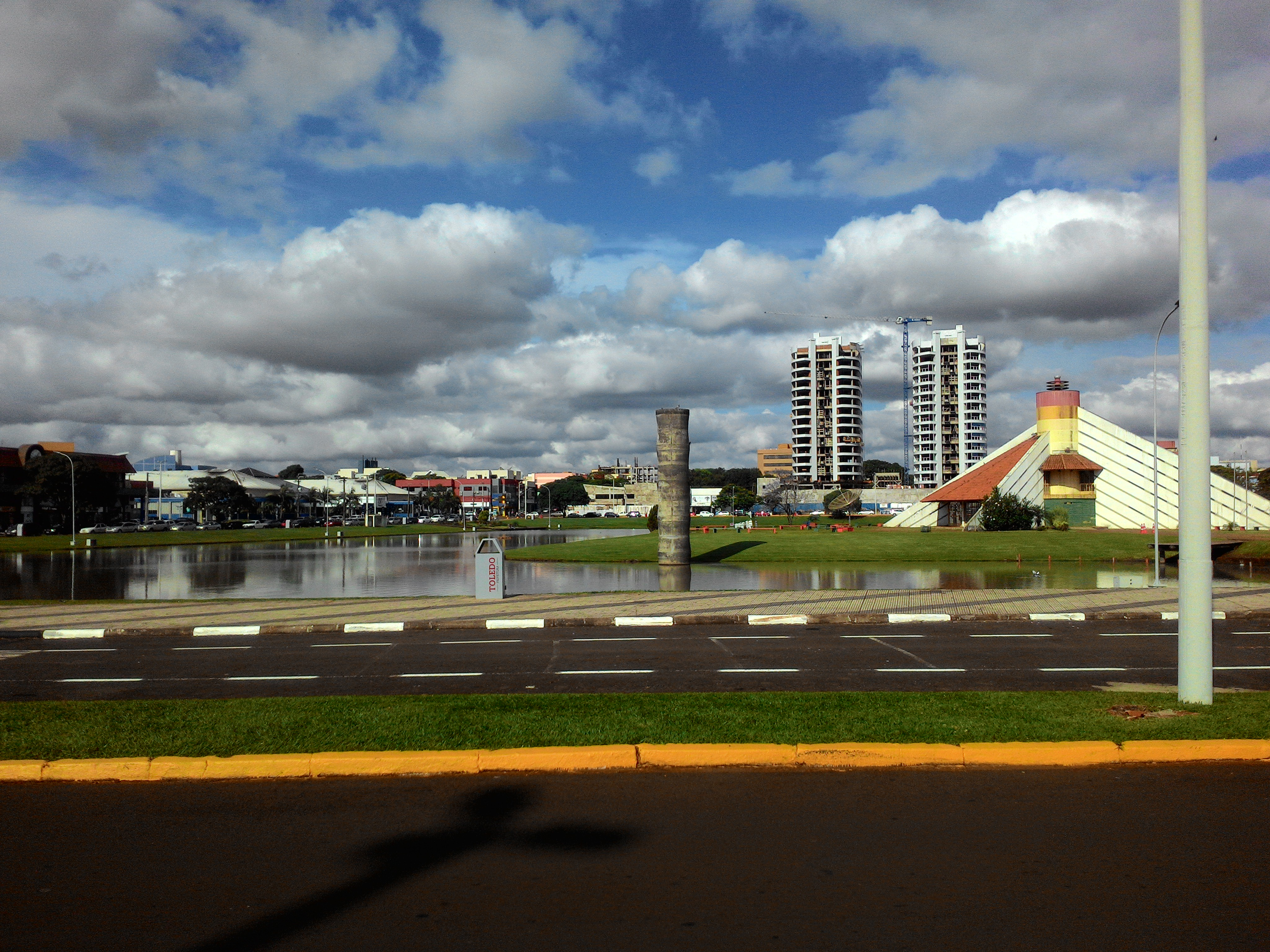
View of the lake

== Culture ==
=== Municipal Theatre ===
Inaugurated on November 26 of 1999, is the 3rd largest theater of the State of Paraná, with total area of 2974.18 square meters, between stage, audience, dressing rooms, rehearsal rooms, administrative and other dependencies.

It seats 1,022 people and also has seats for obese patients and those with special needs.

=== Willy Barth History Museum ===
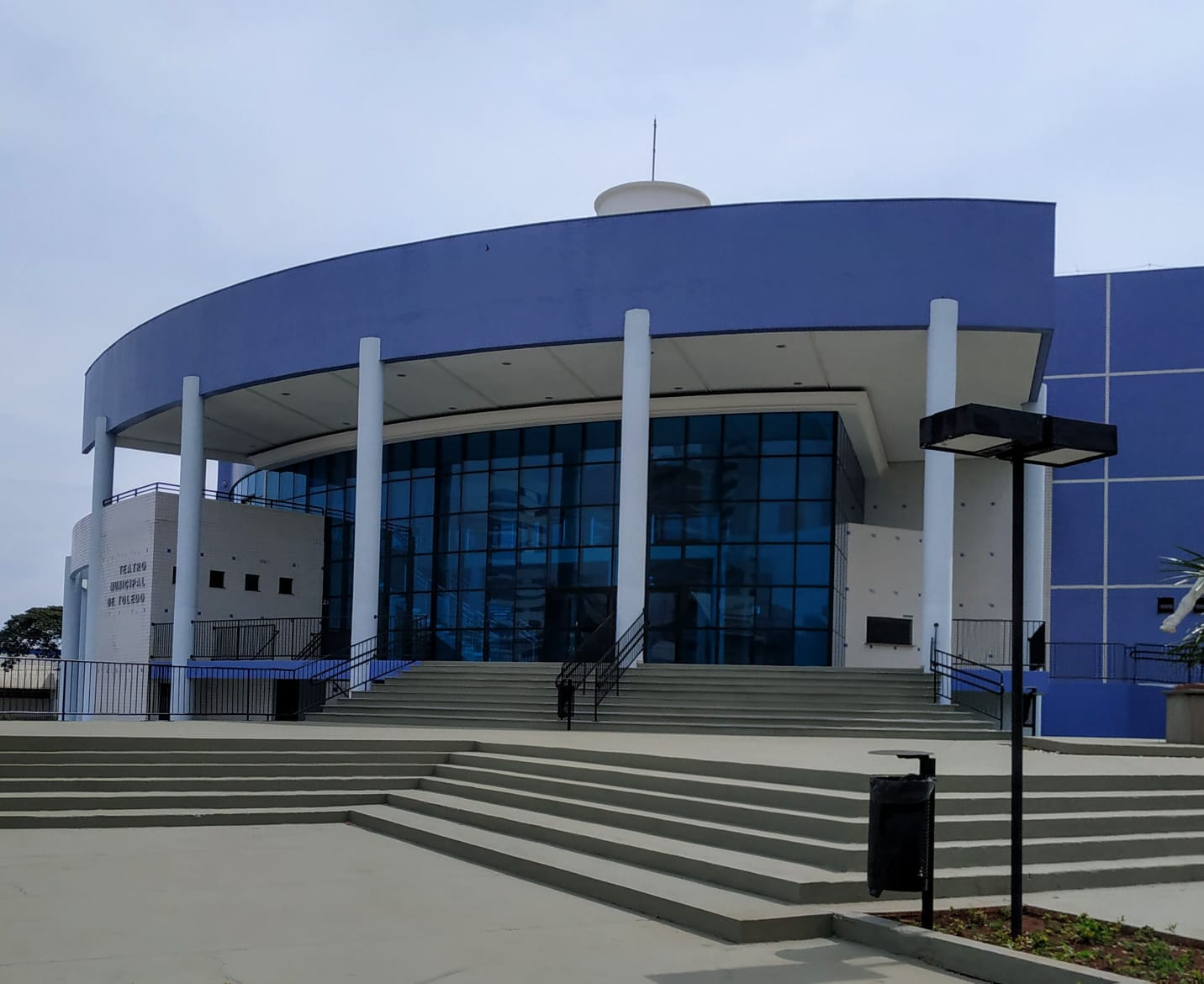
Municipal Theater

Located in its own headquarters on Guarani Avenue, its purpose is to portray the history of the colonization of the city and region. Having already established their own projects, with more space for their collection and study.

=== House of Culture ===
Officially opened on December 4 of 1976 was the first of its kind to be created in the State of Paraná.

It houses the headquarters of the Municipal Culture of Toledo.

=== Libraries ===
The Municipal Library was established in December 12 of 1960 and recorded in the Instituto Nacional do Livro (National Institute of Paper). It has its headquarters at the Cultural Center Oscar Silva, in the city center.

=== Polo Gastronomic ===
Toledo offers a variety of dishes based on typical products of agriculture Logal, such as pork, beef, poultry, fish and fresh produce.

==== Major festivals ====
- Festa Nacional do Porco no Rolete (National Festival of the Pig in Roller) - One of the great gastronomic events in the state, the celebration is held since 1974. It is said that the event was born of a contest where the winner would be the one to produce the most delicious recipe pig roasted whole. The event was the subject of the plot of the United Samba School Bridge, carnival in 1995.
- Concórdia Fest - is a gastronomic event, held in the District of West Concord.
- Festa do Leitão na Estufa (Festival of the Pig in the Greenhouse) - held in the district of Vila Nova, which has pork in one of its main sources of economy. The festival provides another shows the great variety of dishes can be prepared based on pork.
- Festa do Frango (Party of Chicken) - held at the District Ten May. Based in large poultry production in the District, the board of SOCEDEMA (Society for Cultural and Sports Ten May), decided to create an event capable of providing, in addition to the entertainment community, another way to raise funds to improve infrastructure and boost the club's activities. The festival also offers visitors a very special café colonial, and commercial and industrial exposure. It was the forerunner of the party district.
- Bruderfest - typical festival held in the German town of Two Brothers, cultivates the Germanic traditions inherited from the pioneers and has attractions such as gastronomy, music and beer, with an audience of more than 4 million people.
- Ipirangafest - is a popular festival of the town of Vila Ipiranga held to encourage the productive activities of the community, especially poultry and swine, with an audience estimated at more than 3 million people.
- Michel'sFest - held in the district of San Miguel, on the occasion of the passing of its patron, the community has its
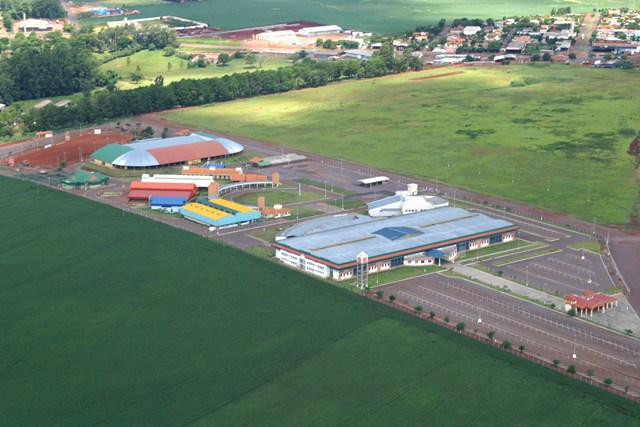
  Event Center Ismael Sperafico(Centro de eventos Ismael Sperafico)
  party, to offer as the main dish costelão roast in the oven.
- Festa da Ovelha e Costelão a Fogo de Chão (Feast of the Sheep and Costelão the Fire Ground) - held at the St. Louis District of the West, when the community celebrates the Day of the Settler and the driver, where is the blessing to the cars and the audience can sample the dishes offered, plus beer.
- Festa do Milho (Feast of the Corn) - held in the town of Good Principle, the annual event brings together nearly 3 million people who have the opportunity to participate in cultural activities and folk. The party is made from corn because Toledo is a major producer of grains in Brazil.
- Festa do Leitão à Sarandi (Feast of the Pig Sarandi) - started in 1996, brings together approximately 7 million people. The suckling pig is prepared whole, grilled and seasoned to provide a very peculiar flavor.
- Festa do Leitão à Paraguaia (Feast of the Paraguayan Piglet) - held in the community of San Salvador, is growing every year, becoming a party with great acceptance by the population of the municipality. The suckling pig is roasted without spices, that only minutes before serving is injected.
- Festa do Leitão à Italiana (Italian Feast of the Pig) - is held annually, usually in October, in the Parish of Infant Jesus in the Garden Porto Alegre. Conceived by Nilton Gregorio and Martin Welter, in the year 2006. The main course consisted of roast suckling pig and stuffed with polenta and Bacon. The public is around 1500 people. In the 2011 edition of the audience was around 4,000 people and is one of the biggest issues so far.

== Sports ==
Account with the Estádio Municipal 14 de Dezembro, with capacity for 20,000 spectators. Opened in 1968 and renovated in the late 1980, is where the Toledo Colonia Work sends his games. It has track and the Olympic Athletics, formed by a public pool, a soccer field and an Olympic Center Rhythmic Gymnastics which houses part of the sport today gives greater visibility within the city through sports contributions and achievements in national and international competitions with their athletes. Currently, the technique Kliemann Anita, who is from Toledo, is the coach of the Brazilian GR. Among the most outstanding athletes of the project of GR in Toledo are the medalists Brazil Angelica Kvieczynski (6 gold medals in the South American Games in Medellin, Colombia in 2010, three bronze and one silver at the Pan American Games in Guadalajara in 2011), Nicolle Muller (3 gold medals in all the Pan American Games in Brazil in 2007) and Ana Paula Scheffer (bronze medal at the Pan American Games in Brazil in 2007).

In the city there are several gyms belonging to organizations and companies, as well as slopes covered in schools, benefiting 11,000 children and adolescents with activities in 35 sports:

- GymnasiumJaime Zeni (Basketball)
- Gym Hugo Zeni (Volleyball)
- Gym Euzébio Garcia
- Gym CCR
- Gym Alcides Pan
- Gym Lauri José Simon

The city is home to an indoor soccer team, the Futsal Association of Toledo, founded in 2009 with the aim of rescuing the sport, a sports project featuring new and different from previous ones. He rode with local athletes and teams has partnered with various schools of the city futsal.

In its first year of activities, participated in the Bronze Key Campeonato Paranaense de Futsal and has already won one of two places, along with the Green Club of Ponta Grossa, for the Silver Key in 2011.

Send your games in gymnasiums:

- Aldanir Angelo Rossoni (Gymnasium CCR) - capacity 4500 spectators
- Alcides Pan - capacity of 6000 spectators

=== JAP'S ===
In 2011 the final phase of the JAP'S (Paraná Open Games) was held in Toledo, between 11–20 November. Competition among 78 cities, had male and female athletes of various sports.

=== Brazil Trophy of Gymnastics ===
Toledo was the first city inside of Brazil to receive this competition that usually occurs in capitals.com national renown of Daiane dos Santos, Daniele Hypolito, Jade Barbosa, Lais Souza, Sérgio Sasaki and Angelica Kvieczynski, the tournament will serve as selective to Olympics London 2012.

=== Rugby ===
Rugby is an emerging sport and rapidly growing in Toledo after it was brought to the city by a South African, Pieter van Wyk. Clube de Rugby Toledo was established in 2010 and since, Toledo hosted the first pilot rugby championship within the JAP's in 2011 and in addition various other State Rugby championships throughout 2011 and 2012. Currently rugby in Toledo is represented by three categories: Orge Knights (adult male team); Harpias (female adult team) and Rhinos (youth team).
