= Pedrão (nickname) =

Pedrão is a hypocorism of the name Pedro, meaning "Big Pedro" in Portuguese.

Notable people named Pedrão include:

- Pedrão (footballer, born 1978), full name Christiano Florêncio da Silva, Brazilian footballer
- Pedrão (footballer, born 1986), full name Pedro Luiz Barone, Brazilian football defender
- Pedrão (footballer, born 1992), full name Pedro Henrique Dias de Amorim, Brazilian football centre-back for Atlético Goianiense
- Pedrão (footballer, born 1997), full name Pedro Henrique de Oliveira Correia, Brazilian footballer for Maccabi Haifa
- Pedrão (footballer, born 2004), full name Pedro Henrique Franklim da Silva, Brazilian football centre-back for Pafos

== See also ==
- Pedro (disambiguation)
- Pedrinho
