= São Pedro =

São Pedro, Portuguese for Saint Peter, may refer to the following places:

== Brazil ==
- Águas de São Pedro, a municipality in the State of São Paulo
- Rio Grande de São Pedro, former name of the municipality of Rio Grande in the state of Rio Grande do Sul
- São Pedro da Água Branca, a municipality in the State of Maranhão
- São Pedro da Aldeia, a municipality in the State of Rio de Janeiro
- São Pedro da Serra, a municipality in the State of Rio Grande do Sul
- São Pedro da União, a municipality in the State of Minas Gerais
- São Pedro das Missões, a municipality in the State of Rio Grande do Sul
- São Pedro de Alcântara, a municipality in the State of Santa Catarina
- São Pedro do Butiá, a municipality in the State of Rio Grande do Sul
- São Pedro do Iguaçu, a municipality in the State of Paraná
- São Pedro do Ivaí, a municipality in the State of Paraná
- São Pedro do Paraná, a municipality in the State of Paraná
- São Pedro do Piauí, a municipality in the State of Piauí
- São Pedro do Suaçuí, a municipality in the State of Minas Gerais
- São Pedro do Turvo, a municipality in the State of São Paulo
- São Pedro dos Crentes, a municipality in the State of Maranhão
- São Pedro, Rio Grande do Norte, a municipality in the State of Rio Grande do Norte
- São Pedro, São Paulo, a municipality in the State of São Paulo

== Portugal ==
- São Pedro (Alandroal), a civil parish in the municipality of Alandroal
- São Pedro (Celorico da Beira), a civil parish in the municipality of Celorico da Beira
- São Pedro (Covilhã), a civil parish in the municipality of Covilhã
- São Pedro (Faro), a civil parish in the municipality of Faro
- São Pedro (Figueira da Foz), a civil parish in the municipality of Figueira da Foz
- São Pedro (Gouveia), a civil parish in the municipality of Gouveia
- São Pedro (Manteigas), a civil parish in the municipality of Manteigas
- São Pedro (Óbidos), a civil parish in the municipality of Óbidos
- São Pedro (Peniche), a civil parish in the municipality of Peniche
- São Pedro (Porto de Mós), a civil parish in the municipality of Porto de Mós
- São Pedro (Torres Novas), a civil parish in the municipality of Torres Novas
- São Pedro (Trancoso), a civil parish in the municipality of Trancoso
- São Pedro (Vila Real), a civil parish in the municipality of Vila Real
- São Pedro de Balsemão, a civil parish in the municipality of Lamego
- São Pedro de Este, a civil parish in the district of Braga
- São Pedro de Esteval, a civil parish in the municipality of Proenca-a-Nova
- São Pedro de Sarracenos, a civil parish in the municipality of Bragança

=== Archipelago of the Azores ===
- São Pedro (Angra do Heroísmo), a civil parish in the municipality of Angra do Heroísmo, Terceira
- São Pedro (Ponta Delgada), a civil parish in the municipality of Ponta Delgada, São Miguel Island
- São Pedro (Vila do Porto), a civil parish in the municipality of Vila do Porto, Santa Maria Island
- São Pedro (Vila Franca do Campo), a civil parish in the municipality of Vila Franca do Campo, São Miguel Island

=== Madeira ===
- São Pedro (Funchal), a civil parish in the municipality of Funchal

== Cape Verde ==
- São Pedro, Cape Verde

== Football clubs ==
- São Pedro Atlético Clube

== See also ==
- São Pedro River (disambiguation)
