= Guayabota =

Barrio of Yabucoa, Puerto Rico

- Barrio
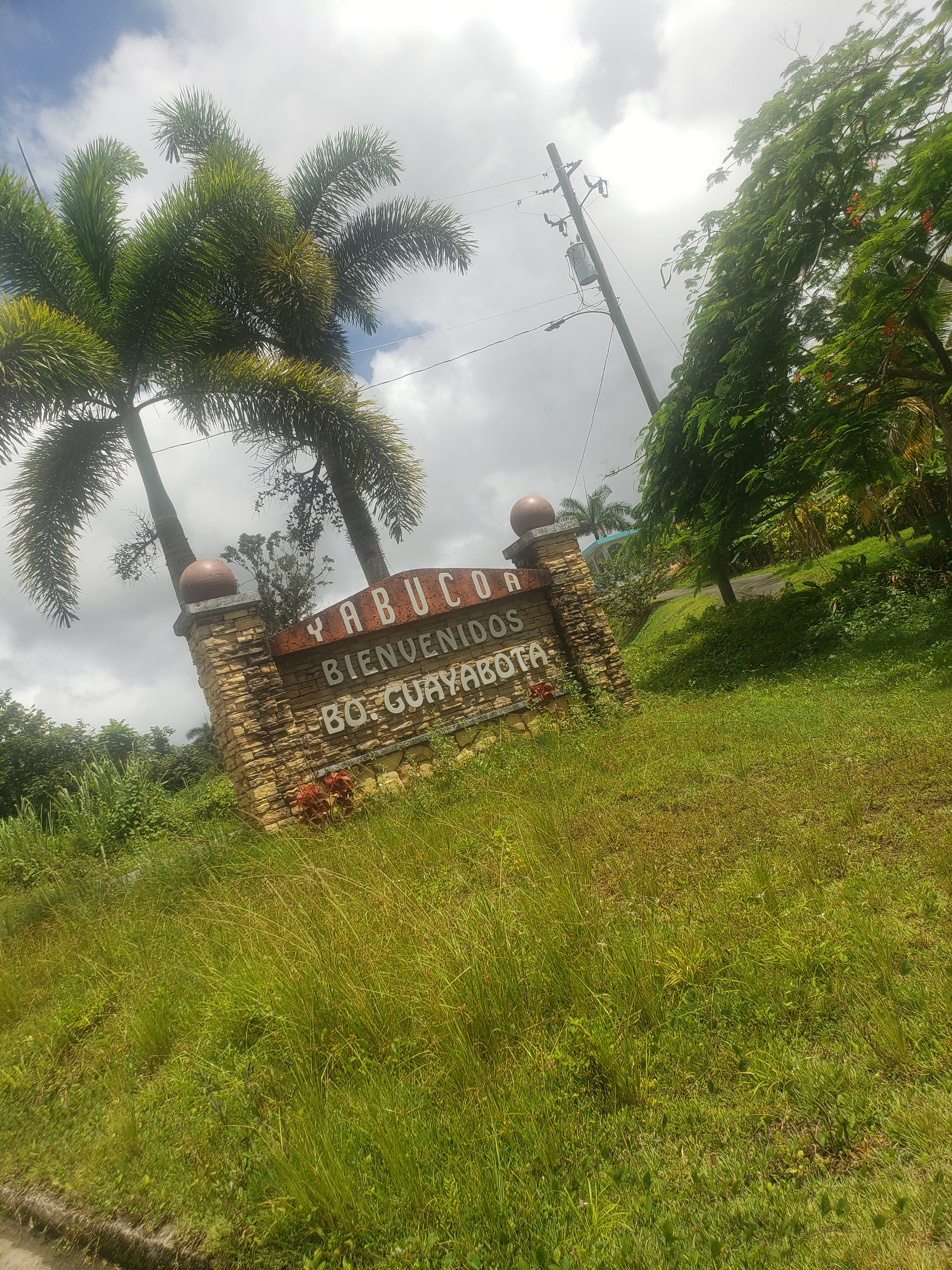
- Rock wall at Guayabota barrio in Yabucoa

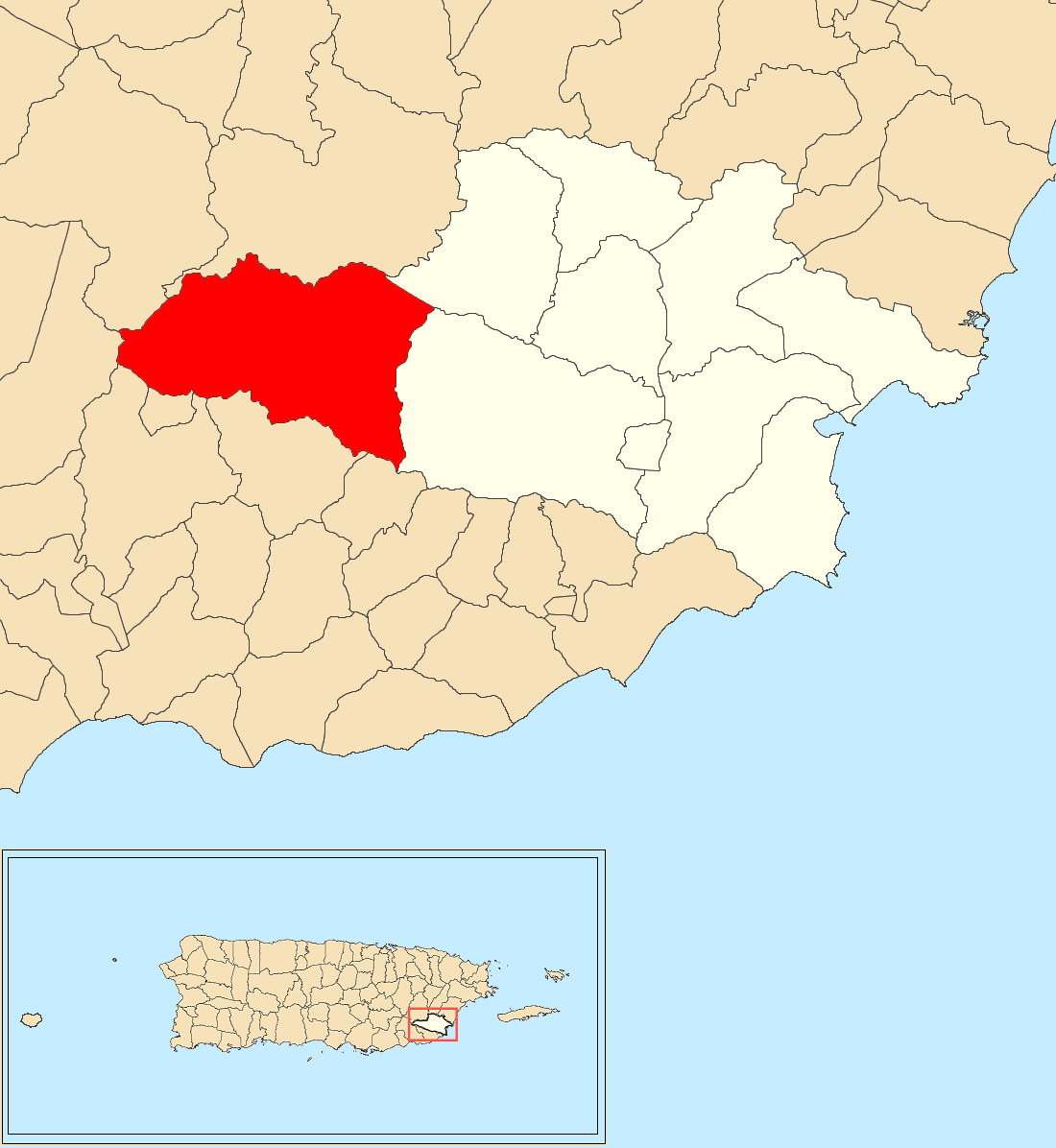
- Location of Guayabota within the municipality of Yabucoa shown in red

- Location of Puerto Rico
- Coordinates: 18°04′18″N 65°58′07″W
- Commonwealth: Puerto Rico
- Municipality: Yabucoa

Area
  - Total: 10.57 sq mi (27.4 km^{2})
  - Land: 10.57 sq mi (27.4 km^{2})
  - Water: 0 sq mi (0 km^{2})
- Elevation: 1,024 ft (312 m)

Population (2010)
  - Total: 3,124
  - Density: 295.6/sq mi (114.1/km^{2})
- Source: 2010 Census
- Time zone: UTC−4 (AST)
- ZIP Code: 00767
- Area code: 787/939

Guayabota is a barrio in the municipality of Yabucoa, Puerto Rico. Its population in 2010 was 3,124.

== History ==
Guayabota was in Spain's gazetteers until Puerto Rico was ceded by Spain in the aftermath of the Spanish–American War under the terms of the Treaty of Paris of 1898 and became an unincorporated territory of the United States. In 1899, the United States Department of War conducted a census of Puerto Rico finding that the population of Guayabota barrio was 904.

Historical population
Census	Pop.	Note	%±
1900	904		—
1910	1,700		88.1%
1920	1,778		4.6%
1930	1,853		4.2%
1940	2,525		36.3%
1950	2,267		−10.2%
1960	2,681		18.3%
1970	2,598		−3.1%
1980	1,648		−36.6%
1990	2,986		81.2%
2000	3,240		8.5%
2010	3,124		−3.6%
U.S. Decennial Census; 1899 (shown as 1900) 1910-1930; 1930-1950 1980-2000 2010

== Geography ==
The area is prone to landslides and its infrastructure and bridges have often been destroyed by hurricanes, and even by heavy rainfall. Puerto Rico Highway 182 goes through this barrio and its sectors.

=== Hurricane Maria ===
Hurricane Maria struck the island of Puerto Rico on September 19, 2017, knocking out power to the entire island (and also affected access to clean water). Many older residents of Yabucoa died as a result of Hurricane Maria. The mayor of Yabucoa, Rafael Surillo, stated on June 12, 2018 (nine months after the hurricane) that large swaths of Yabucoa municipality barrios Guayabota, Tejas, Juan Martín, Calabazas, Limones y Aguacate, and 100% of barrio Jácanas were still without electrical power. In 2018, the people of Guayabota hoped to develop emergency plans and sustainable community plans to help them be prepared in the case of a future emergency, such as happened with Hurricane Irma and Hurricane Maria.

== Sectors ==
Barrios (which are, in contemporary times, roughly comparable to minor civil divisions) in turn are further subdivided into smaller local populated place areas/units called sectores (sectors in English). The types of sectores may vary, from normally sector to urbanización to reparto to barriada to residencial, among others.

The following sectors are in Guayabota barrio:

Camino Doña Zaza, Sector El Cruce, Sector El Veinte, Sector La Aldea, Sector La Coa, Sector La Herradura, Sector Las Panas, Sector Los Sánchez, Sector Quebrada Grande, Sector Quebradillas, Sector Surillo, and Sector Tres Puntos.

== See also ==
- List of communities in Puerto Rico
- List of barrios and sectors of Yabucoa, Puerto Rico
