= Pedrinho =

Pedrinho is a Portuguese nickname for people named Pedro, meaning "little Pedro".

Notable people with the nickname include:

== Brazil ==
- Pedrinho (football manager), coached the national team in 1957
- Pedrinho (footballer, born 1957), defender
- Pedrinho (footballer, born 1973), forward
- Pedrinho (footballer, born 1976), midfielder
- Pedrinho (footballer, born 1977), midfielder
- Pedrinho (footballer, born 1986), forward
- Pedrinho (footballer, born 1993), midfielder
- Pedrinho (footballer, born May 1994), attacking midfielder
- Pedrinho (footballer, born November 1994), forward
- Pedrinho (footballer, born January 1998), defensive midfielder
- Pedrinho (footballer, born April 1998), attacking midfielder
- Pedrinho (footballer, born 1999), forward
- Pedrinho (footballer, born 2002), left-back
- Pedrinho (footballer, born January 2004), attacking midfielder
- Pedrinho (footballer, born February 2004), attacking midfielder
- Pedrinho Gaúcho (1953–2019), football forward
- Pedrinho Sousa (born 1990), football goalkeeper

== Portugal ==
- Pedrinho (footballer, born 1985), defender
- Pedrinho (footballer, born 1992), midfielder

== See also ==
- Pedri (born 2002), Spanish footballer
- Pedro (disambiguation)
