= Puerto Rico Highway 182 =

Highway in Puerto Rico

Highway 182
- Ruta 182

Route information
- Maintained by Puerto Rico DTPW
- Length: 15.9 km (9.9 mi)
- Existed: 1953–present

Major junctions
- West end: PR-181 in Guayabota
- PR-902 in Guayabota; PR-9918 in Calabazas; PR-918 in Calabazas; PR-9909 in Calabazas; PR-900 in Yabucoa barrio-pueblo; PR-9910 in Yabucoa barrio-pueblo
- East end: PR-3 in Juan Martín

Location
- Country: United States
- Territory: Puerto Rico
- Municipalities: Yabucoa

Highway system
- Roads in Puerto Rico; List
← PR-181	→ PR-183

Puerto Rico Highway 182 (PR-182) is a primary road located entirely within the municipality of Yabucoa, Puerto Rico. The road has its northern terminus at its intersection with Puerto Rico Highway 181 in the northwestern end of the town, near San Lorenzo, and its southern terminus in downtown Yabucoa, near PR-9910 and PR-3, where it provides access to many municipal government offices.

== Route description ==
PR-182 provides an alternate route to PR-181 to reach San Lorenzo from Yabucoa since the latter road continues south-southwest to Patillas. Taking PR-181 and PR-182 from San Lorenzo to Yabucoa can take significantly longer than taking PR-203 to PR-30 in Gurabo, continuing PR-30 east to Humacao and then taking PR-53 to Yabucoa, because the PR-203/PR-30/PR-53 (with the exception of a junction in PR-203 with PR-931) is mostly freeway.

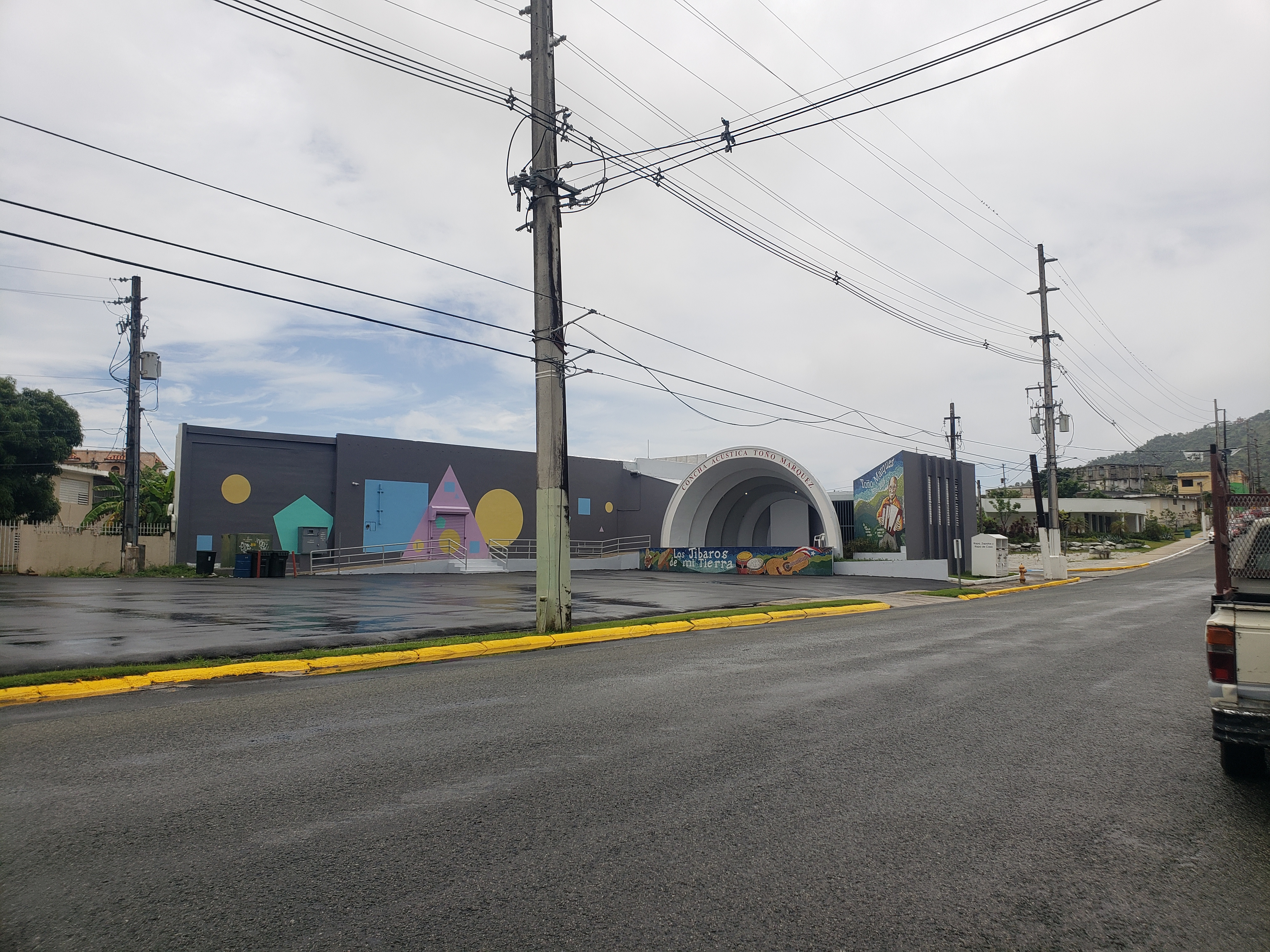
PR-182 in downtown Yabucoa

== Major intersections ==
The entire route is located in Yabucoa.

Location	km	mi	Destinations	Notes
Guayabota	15.9	9.9	PR-181 – Patillas, San Lorenzo	Western terminus of PR-182; the Ruta Panorámica continues toward San Lorenzo
Guayabota	11.8– 11.7	7.3– 7.3	PR-902 – Jácanas	
Calabazas	8.3	5.2	PR-9918 – Jácanas	
Calabazas	7.9	4.9	PR-918 – Calabazas	
Calabazas	3.9	2.4	PR-918 – Calabazas	
Calabazas	1.9	1.2	PR-9909 (Desvío Luis A. Ferré Aguayo) – Yabucoa	
Yabucoa barrio-pueblo	1.4	0.87	PR-900 – Calabazas	
Yabucoa barrio-pueblo	0.8	0.50	PR-9910 (Calle Cristóbal Colón) to PR-901 (Calle Saturnino Rodríguez) – Yabucoa	Northern terminus of PR-182 through Calle Cristóbal Colón; the Ruta Panorámica continues toward Maunabo via Camino Nuevo–Emajagua
Juan Martín	0.0	0.0	PR-3 – Maunabo, Humacao	Eastern terminus of PR-182; the Ruta Panorámica continues toward Maunabo via Calabazas
1.000 mi = 1.609 km; 1.000 km = 0.621 mi: Route transition

== See also ==
- 1953 Puerto Rico highway renumbering
