= São Pedro River =

There are several rivers named São Pedro River.

== Brazil ==
- São Pedro River (Alonzo River), a river of Paraná state in southern Brazil
- São Pedro River (Guandu River), a river of Rio de Janeiro state in southeastern Brazil
- São Pedro River (Macaé River), a river of Rio de Janeiro state in southeastern Brazil
- São Pedro River (Minas Gerais), a river of Minas Gerais state in southeastern Brazil
- São Pedro River (Pernambuco)
- São Pedro River (Santa Catarina), a river of Santa Catarina state in southeastern Brazil

== See also ==
- São Pedro (disambiguation)
