= Universidade Paranaense =

Private university in Paraná, Brazil

Unipar
- Type: Private
- Established: 1972
- Rector: Cândido Garcia
- Location: Umuarama, Paraná, Brazil
- Campus: Urban
- Website: www.unipar.br

The Universidade Paranaense (abbreviated Unipar) is one of the private universities of the State of Paraná, Brazil.

Based in the city of Umuarama, and campuses in the following cities: Cascavel, Cianorte, Francisco Beltrão, Guaíra, Paranavaí and Toledo, all cities located in Paraná State.
