= Pedro (disambiguation) =

Pedro is a masculine given name.

Pedro may also refer to:

== People ==
- Pedró (born 1987), Portuguese footballer José Pedro Azevedo Ferreira
- Pedro (footballer, born 1987), Spanish footballer Pedro Eliezer Rodríguez Ledesma
- Pedro (footballer, born 1997), Brazilian footballer Pedro Guilherme Abreu dos Santos
- Edmilson Pedro (born 1997), Angolan judoka
- Pedro, pen name of Salo Grenning (1918–1986), Norwegian illustrator

== Places in the United States ==
- Pedro, South Dakota, a ghost town in the United States
- Pedro, Ohio, an unincorporated community in the United States

== Arts and entertainment ==
- Pedro (card game), a card game
- Pedro (2008 film), an American film about Pedro Zamora
- Pedro (2021 film), an Indian Kannada-language film
- Pedro (band), a Japanese band
- "Pedro" (song), a 1980 song by Raffaella Carrà
- Pedro (video game), a 1984 video game
- Pedro (The Mysterious Cities of Gold), a character in the animated series The Mysterious Cities of Gold
- Pedro (One Piece), a character in the Japanese manga One Piece
- Pedro (Boy's Life), a fictional burro created as the mascot of the Boy Scouts of America magazine Boy's Life

== Other uses ==
- PEDRO Center, a satellite ground center abbreviated as PEDRO
- Physiotherapy Evidence Database, a physiotherapy database sometimes abbreviated as PEDro
- One of the callsigns for helicopters of the United States Air Force Combat Rescue School and successive services

== See also ==
- San Pedro (disambiguation)
- São Pedro (disambiguation)
