= São Pedro do Suaçuí =

- Municipality
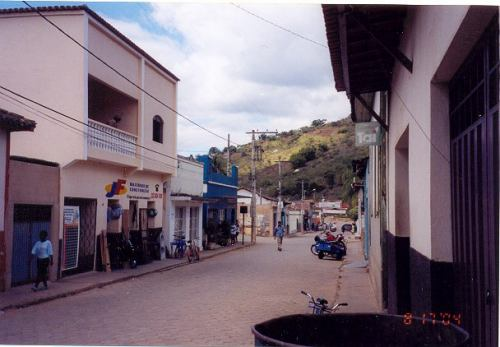

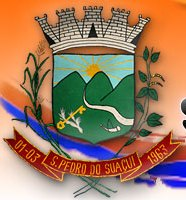
- Coat of arms

- Location in Brazil
- Coordinates: 18°21′57″S 42°36′10″W
- Country: Brazil
- Region: Southeast
- State: Minas Gerais
- Mesoregion: Vale do Rio Doce

Population (2022 Census)
  - Total: 5,103
  - Estimate (2025): 5,143
- Time zone: UTC−3 (BRT)

São Pedro do Suaçuí is a municipality in the state of Minas Gerais in the Southeast region of Brazil.

== See also ==
- List of municipalities in Minas Gerais
