= Quatro Pontes =

Coordinates: 24°35′S 53°58′W

- Municipality
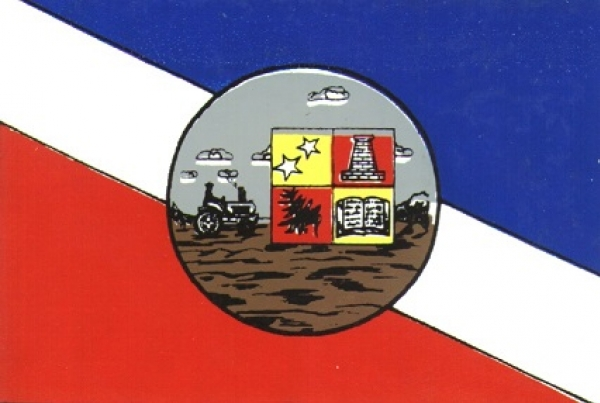
- Flag
- Interactive map of Quatro Pontes
- Country: Brazil
- Region: Southern
- State: Paraná
- Mesoregion: Oeste Paranaense

Population (2020)
  - Total: 4,029
- Time zone: UTC−3 (BRT)

Quatro Pontes is a municipality in the state of Paraná in the Southern Region of Brazil.

== See also ==
- List of municipalities in Paraná
