= Cascavel =

Municipality in Paraná, Brazil

- Municipality
- Municipality of Cascavel
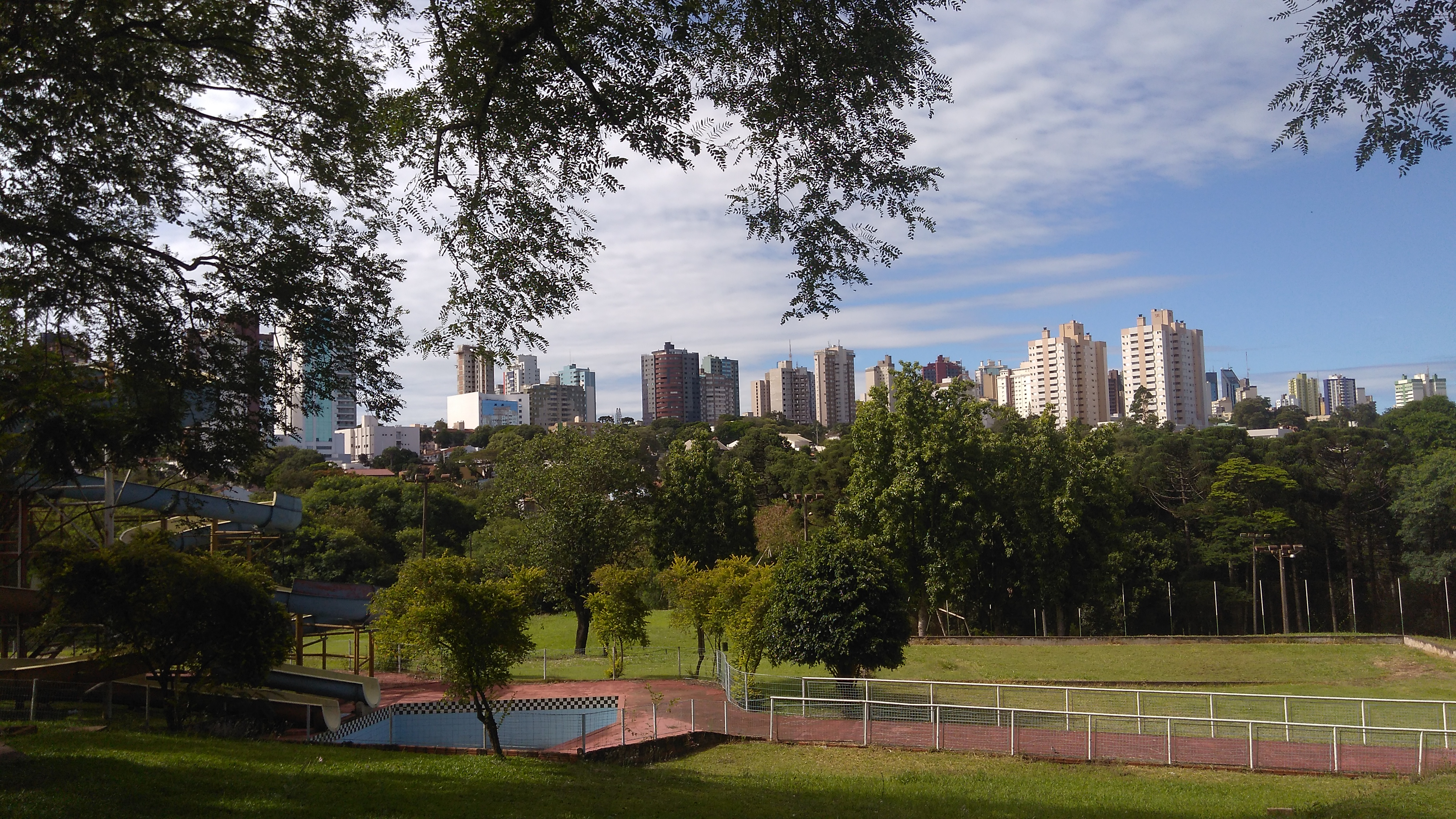
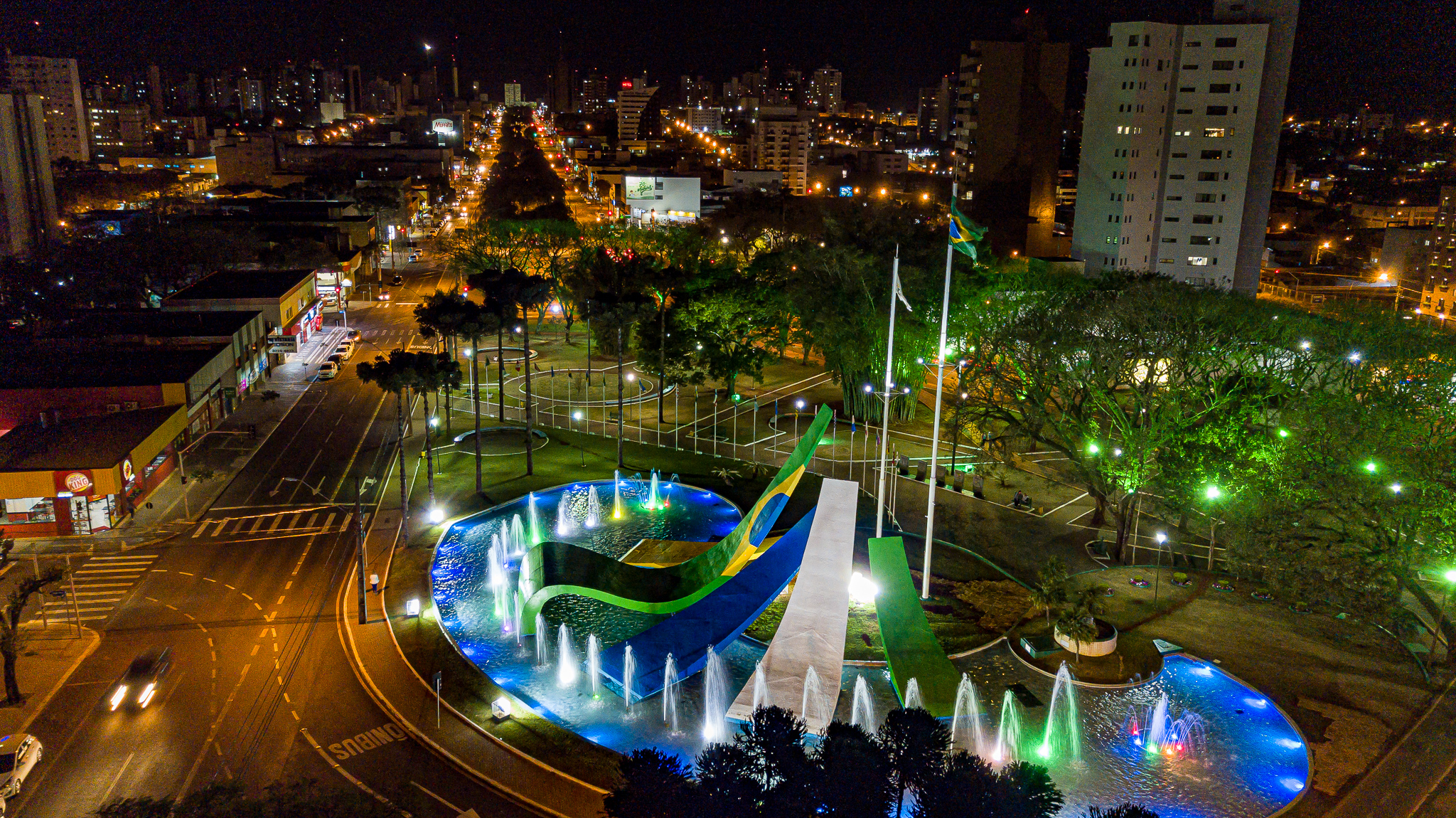
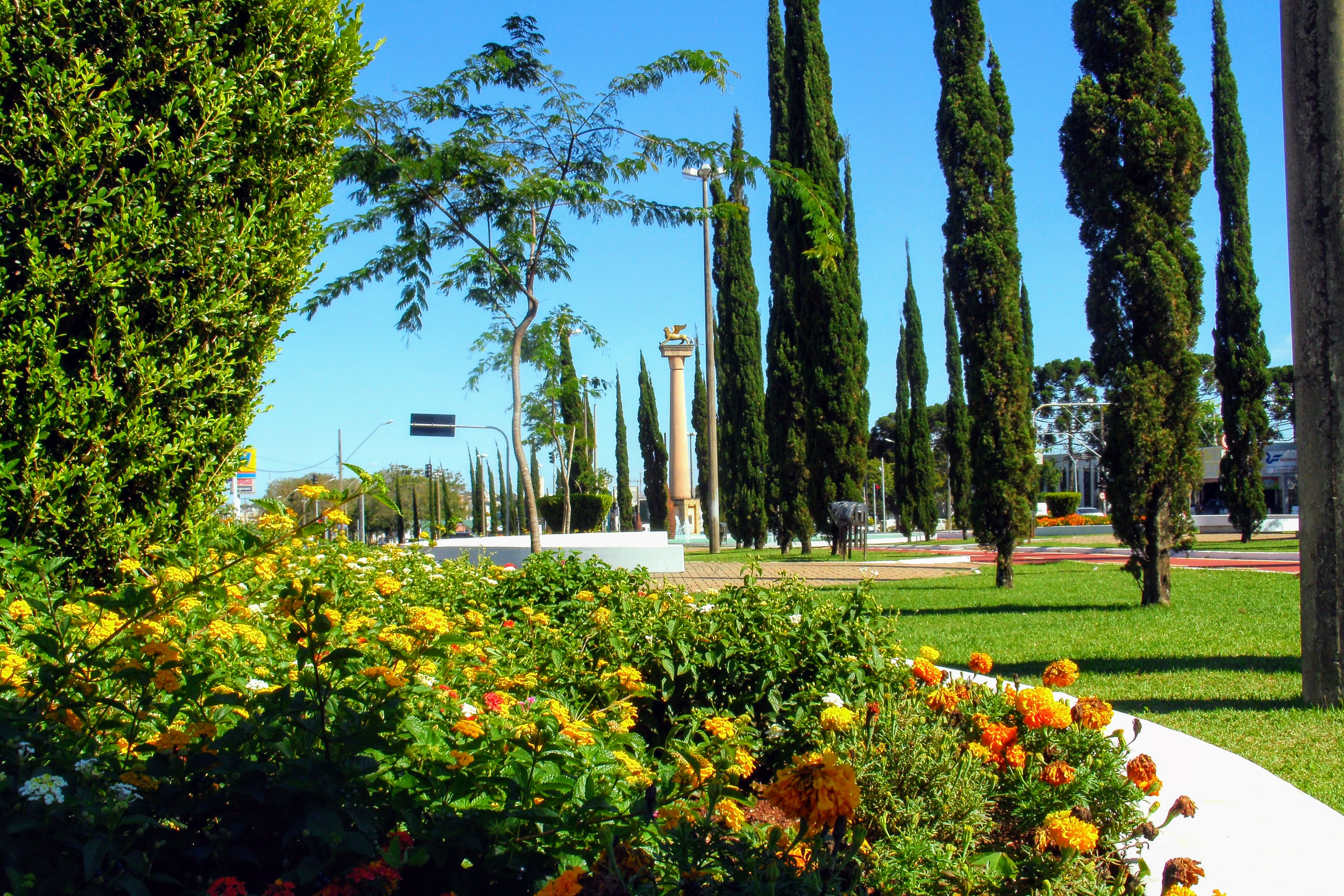
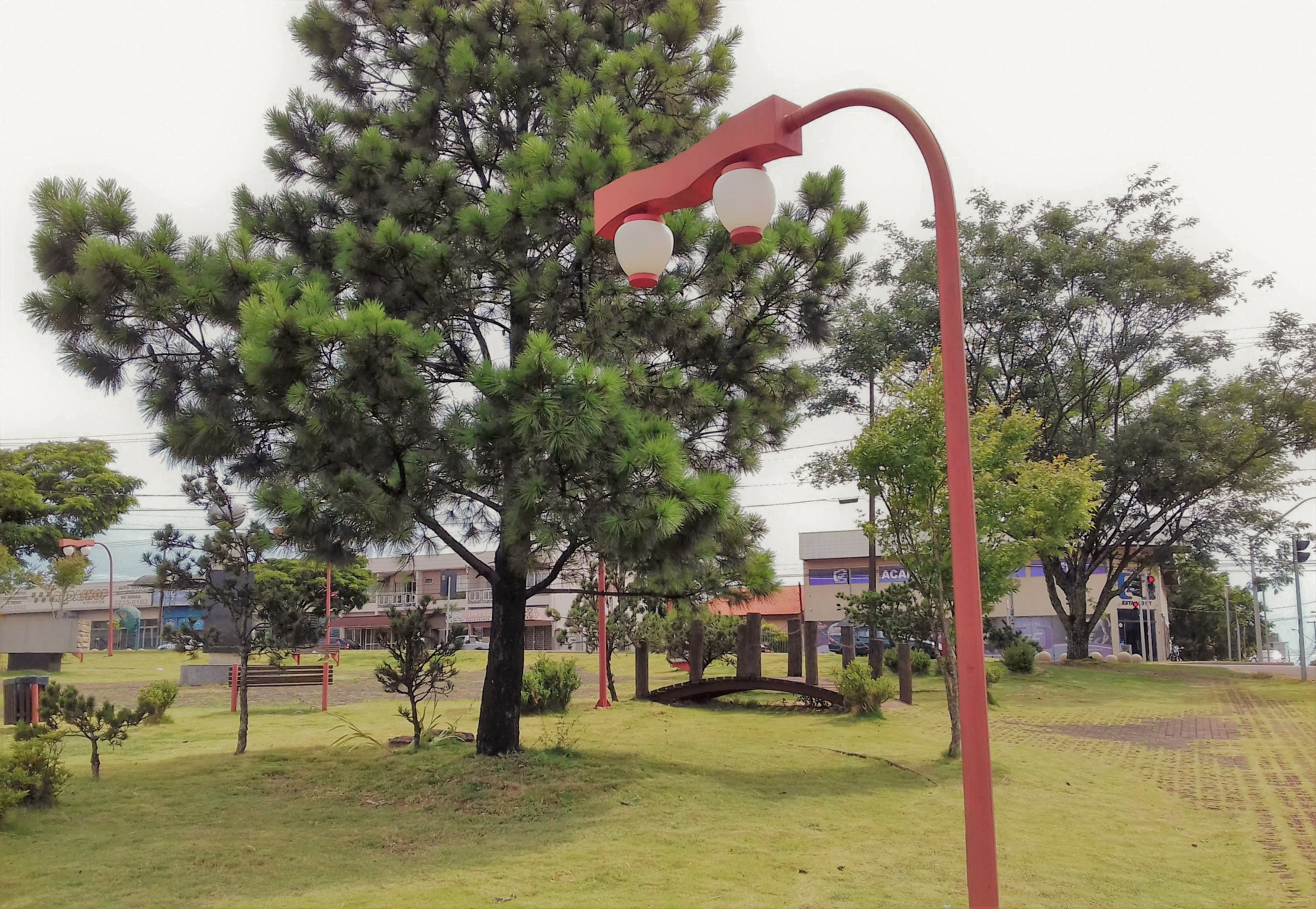
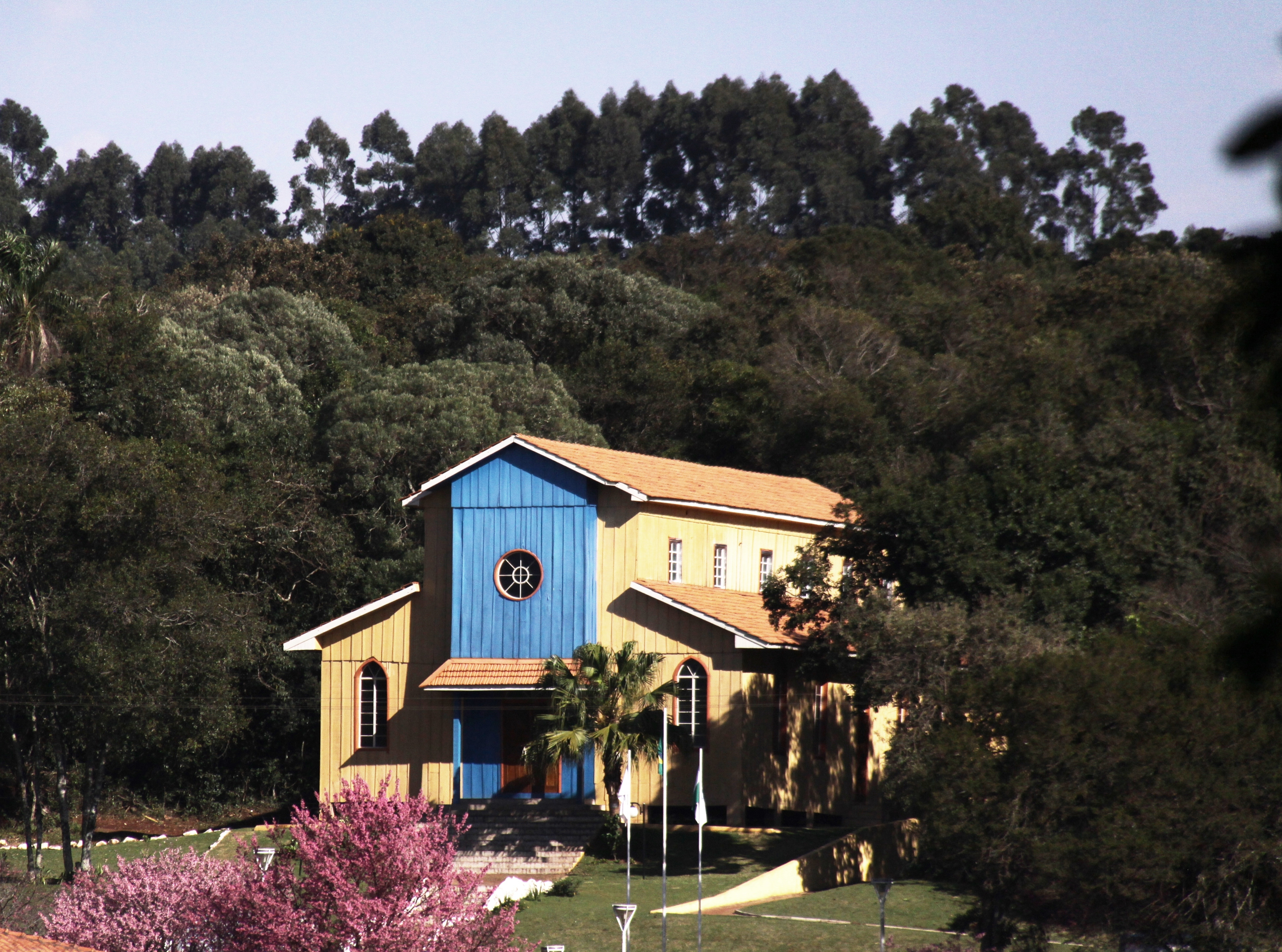
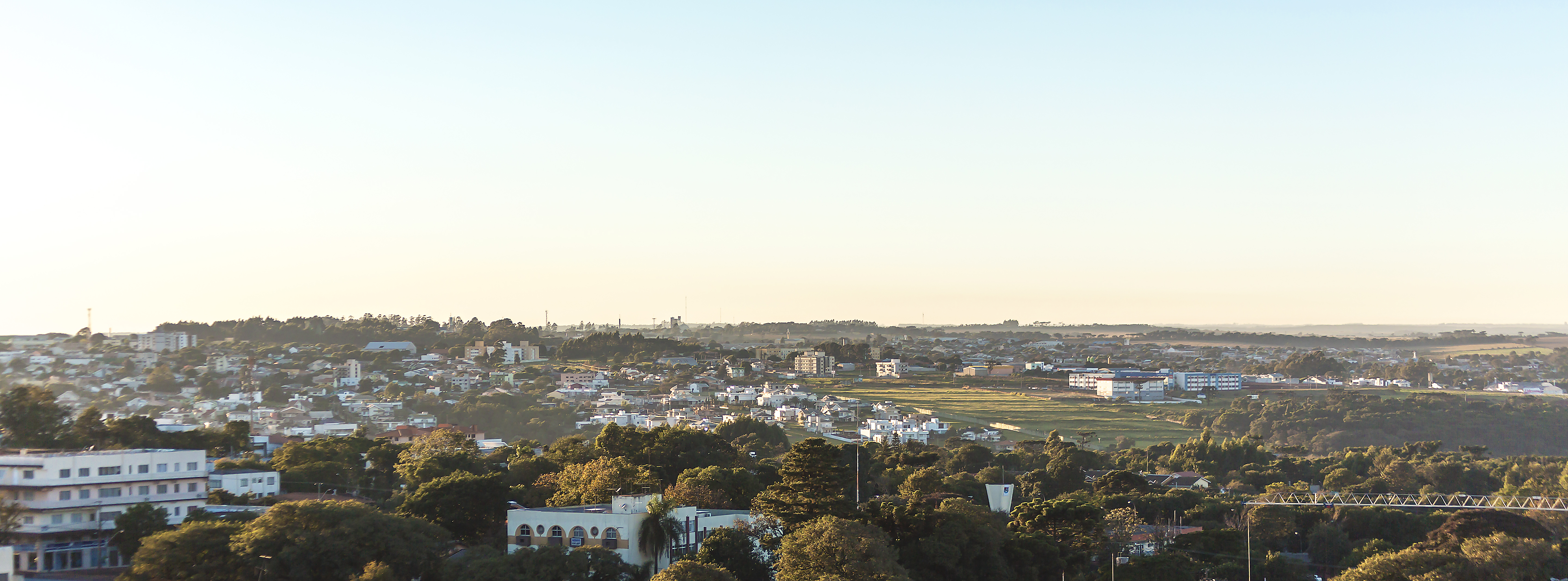

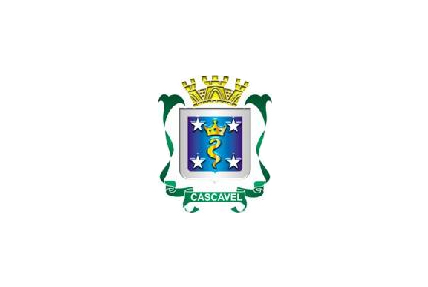
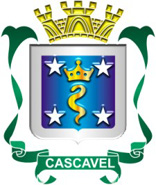
- Flag Coat of arms
- Nicknames: Capital of the West; Mercosur Metropolis
- Location in Paraná

- Location in Brazil
- Coordinates: 24°57′20″S 53°27′19″W
- Country: Brazil
- Region: South
- State: Paraná
- Founding: March 28, 1928
- Emancipation: November 14, 1951

Government
  - Mayor: Renato Silva (PL)

Area
  - Municipality: 2,101.074 km^{2} (811.229 sq mi)
  - Metro: 10,562.37 km^{2} (4,078.15 sq mi)
- Elevation: 781 m (2,562 ft)

Population (2025)
  - Municipality: 368,195
  - Density: 175.241/km^{2} (453.873/sq mi)
  - Metro: 552,097
  - Metro density: 52.2702/km^{2} (135.379/sq mi)
- Time zone: UTC-3
- Postal code: 85816-000
- Area code: (+55) 45
- HDI (2010): 0.782 – high
- Website: cascavel.pr.gov.br

Cascavel is a city in the state of Paraná in Brazil. It is the fifth most populous city in the state with 368,195 inhabitants, according to IBGE 2025 estimate. The distance to Curitiba, the state capital, is 491 kilometers by freeway.

Relatively new and with a privileged topography, Cascavel's development was planned, which gives it wide streets and well distributed neighborhoods. With an area of 2,100.831 km^{2}, it is considered a strategic hub of Mercosul. It is the main city in the Cascavel Metropolitan Area.

The city is on a plateau 781 meters above sea level. It is 504 km west of the state capital of Curitiba and 605 km west of the sea port of Paranaguá, 140 km from the three borders (Paraguay, Argentina and Brazil) at 24° 58' South, 53° 26' West.

== Toponymy ==
The name of the city means rattlesnake in Portuguese; it arises from a variation of the classical Latin "cascabus", meaning "bubbling water boiling". According to legend, a group of settlers camped one night in the region and they were woken by the sound of a rattle; later they realized they set up the camp next to a rattlesnake.

== History ==
=== Cycle of "erva mate" ===
The Caingangue natives inhabited western Paraná, which was occupied by the Spaniards in 1557, when they founded the Ciudad del Real Guayrá, in the current city of Terra Roxa.

A new occupation started in 1730 with troops (tropeirismo in Portuguese), but the settlement of the current city began in the late 1910s by settlers of mixed racial ethnicity (caboclos (people of indigenous and European descent)), and descendants of Slavic immigrants, at the peak of the cycle of erva mate.

The village began to form on March 28, 1928, when José Silverio de Oliveira, dubbed "Nho Jeca", bought a glebe from the settler Jose Antonio Elias, in the historical area called Encruzilhada dos Gomes, and which is currently the Cascavel Velho neighborhood. It was at a junction of several trails open by ervateiros (cultivators of erva mate), drovers and military, where de Oliveira set up his warehouse. His entrepreneurial spirit was key to the arrival of new people, who brought ideas and investments.

From the 1930s and 1940s, thousands of southern settlers, mostly descendants of Poles, Germans, Italians, Ukrainians and caboclos migrating from coffee regions, began logging, farming and raising pigs in the village, which became a district in 1938.

Notably, the locality was already included in military maps from 1924, and the village was made official by the town hall of Foz do Iguaçu in 1936, with the name of Cascavel. The prelate of that city, Monsignor William Maria Thiletzek, renamed it "Aparecida dos Portos" (a Brazilian name for Mary, The Mother of Jesus), a name that did not prosper amongst the inhabitants.

=== Cycle of wood ===
In the 1930s, with the cycle of erva mate at a close, the surrounding area entered into the so-called "cycle of wood", which attracted a large number of families from Santa Catarina and Rio Grande do Sul. In particular, there were many Polish, German and Italian settlers, who formed the basis of the municipal population.

As the native forests were depleted, the land became available to agriculture sector, which underpins the present-day economy.

In 1938, Cascavel became an administrative district.

=== Emancipation ===
The municipality of Cascavel was emancipated on November 14, 1951, by state law n° 790, separating it from Foz do Iguaçu. For decades there was a discussion about whether this would be the proper date, as the installation of the first municipal government occurred only on December 14, 1952. However, in 2010, with the law n° 5.689, the discussion was put to rest.

=== Development ===
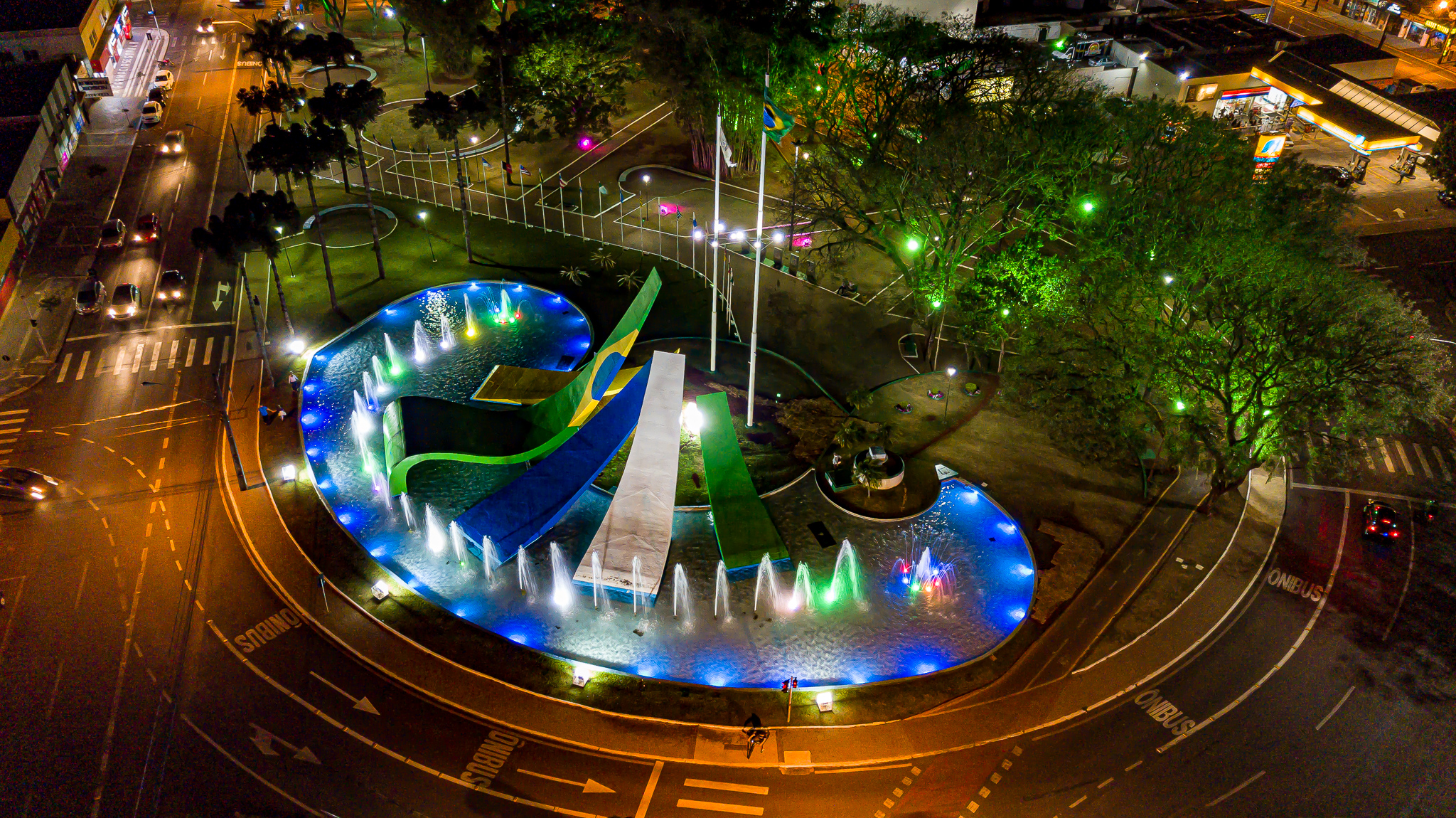
Praça do Migrante

As the cycle of timber closed in the late 1970s, industrialization began along with increased agricultural activity and a rising service industry. In less than six decades, Cascavel went from a rest stop for travelers and trappers, to the largest municipality in western Paraná and one of the largest economic centers in southern Brazil.

=== List of mayors ===
Name	Terms
José Neves Formighieri	December 14, 1952, to December 14, 1956
Helberto Edwino Schwarz	December 14, 1956, to December 14, 1960
Octacílio Mion	December 14, 1960, to December 14, 1964
Odilon Correia Reinhardt	December 14, 1964, to January 31, 1969
Octacílio Mion	January 31, 1969, to January 31, 1973
Pedro Muffato	January 31, 1973, to January 31, 1977
Jacy Miguel Scanagatta	February 1, 1977, to January 31, 1983
Fidelcino Tolentino	February 1, 1983, to December 31, 1988
Salazar Barreiros	January 1, 1989, to December 31, 1992
Fidelcino Tolentino	January 1, 1993 to December 31, 1996
Salazar Barreiros	January 1, 1997, to December 31, 2000
Edgar Bueno	January 1, 2001, to December 31, 2004
Lísias Tomé	January 1, 2005, to December 31, 2008
Edgar Bueno	January 1, 2009, to December 31, 2016
Leonaldo Paranhos	January 1, 2017, to December 31, 2024
Renato Silva	January 1, 2025 to Current affairs

Source: Jornal Hoje

== Geography ==
=== Climate ===
Cascavel is a humid city, with a humid subtropical climate (Cfa, according to the Köppen climate classification). The annual average temperature is 21 °C (70 °F), with a maximum of 28° (85 °F). Annual average precipitation is 1965 mm (77.362 inches).

Climate data for Cascavel, elevation 760 m (2,490 ft), (1976–2005 normals, extremes 1973–1998)
Month	Jan	Feb	Mar	Apr	May	Jun	Jul	Aug	Sep	Oct	Nov	Dec	Year
Record high °C (°F)	34.4 (93.9)	34.1 (93.4)	33.9 (93.0)	32.2 (90.0)	31.0 (87.8)	28.0 (82.4)	28.9 (84.0)	33.2 (91.8)	35.4 (95.7)	34.9 (94.8)	36.6 (97.9)	36.4 (97.5)	36.6 (97.9)
Mean daily maximum °C (°F)	28.6 (83.5)	28.3 (82.9)	28.2 (82.8)	25.8 (78.4)	22.4 (72.3)	20.4 (68.7)	20.9 (69.6)	22.7 (72.9)	24.0 (75.2)	26.2 (79.2)	27.8 (82.0)	28.3 (82.9)	25.3 (77.5)
Daily mean °C (°F)	23.1 (73.6)	22.7 (72.9)	22.2 (72.0)	19.9 (67.8)	17.0 (62.6)	15.1 (59.2)	15.2 (59.4)	16.7 (62.1)	18.0 (64.4)	20.2 (68.4)	21.8 (71.2)	22.8 (73.0)	19.6 (67.2)
Mean daily minimum °C (°F)	19.1 (66.4)	19.0 (66.2)	18.3 (64.9)	16.0 (60.8)	13.3 (55.9)	11.5 (52.7)	11.3 (52.3)	12.6 (54.7)	13.6 (56.5)	15.8 (60.4)	17.1 (62.8)	18.6 (65.5)	15.5 (59.9)
Record low °C (°F)	9.8 (49.6)	9.2 (48.6)	6.7 (44.1)	3.6 (38.5)	−0.4 (31.3)	−0.8 (30.6)	−4.2 (24.4)	−1.9 (28.6)	0.2 (32.4)	4.0 (39.2)	7.2 (45.0)	10.8 (51.4)	−4.2 (24.4)
Average precipitation mm (inches)	191.9 (7.56)	177.6 (6.99)	141.5 (5.57)	167.2 (6.58)	192.3 (7.57)	131.1 (5.16)	110.2 (4.34)	107.1 (4.22)	159.0 (6.26)	224.9 (8.85)	181.7 (7.15)	187.5 (7.38)	1,972 (77.63)
Average precipitation days (≥ 1.0 mm)	14	13	12	10	10	10	8	8	10	12	11	12	130
Average relative humidity (%)	77	79	75	74	76	77	73	69	69	70	68	73	73
Mean monthly sunshine hours	224.3	193.7	216.0	202.3	196.5	183.9	209.7	202.8	179.0	203.7	223.9	226.4	2,462.2
Source 1: Empresa Brasileira de Pesquisa Agropecuária (EMBRAPA)
Source 2: IDR-Paraná (precipitation days and sun 1973–1998)

=== Demographics ===
According to the IBGE, the population of Cascavel is formed of the following ethnicities

Ethnicity	Percentage
White	70,15%
Mixed	26,25%
Black	2,59%
Asian	0,88%
Indigenous	0,27%

=== Evolution of the population ===
The city has experienced significant population growth since its foundation, especially during the first decades. On the other hand, several municipalities were ultimately removed from Cascavel, which slightly reduced its demographic expansion.

Year	Population	Percent change
1950	404	
1960	39,598	9.701%
1970	89,921	127,08%
1980	163,459	81,78%
1991	192,990	18,07%
2000	245,369	27,14%
2010	286,172	16,63%
2022	348,051	21,6%

=== Cascavel Metropolitan Region ===
Cascavel is the headquarters of the Cascavel Metropolitan Region, an area undergoing conurbation that comprises 23 municipalities in the Western Mesoregion and has a total population of 552,097. It was approved by the Paraná State Legislative Assembly on December 16, 2014, through bill 402/2012 and sanctioned by Governor Beto Richa on January 14, 2015, thus meeting a long-standing local demand.

== Economy ==
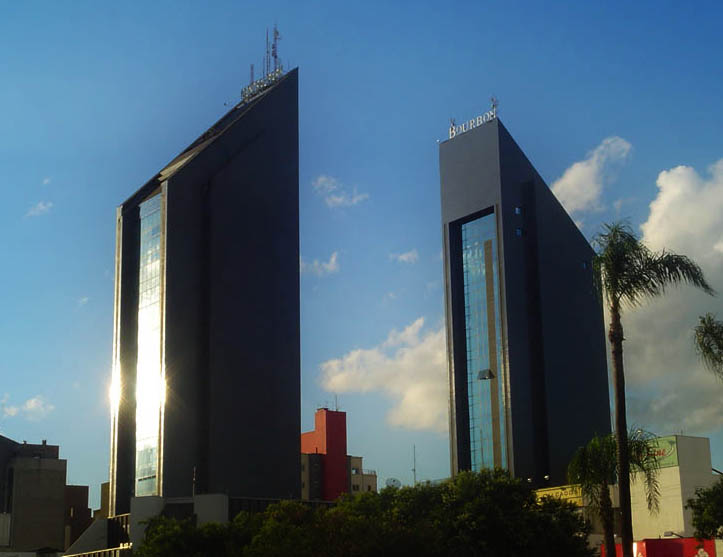
Economic center of Cascavel

Cascavel is responsible for 26% of the total production of cereals in the state of Paraná. The main crops are soybeans, wheat, corn, rice, cotton and beans. It is also a big producer of poultry, swine and cattle.

Participation in the municipal GDP:

Livestock raising: 5.95%
Industry: 16.63%
Services: 77.42%

The main industries are food processing, chemicals, metallurgy, and beverages.

It is the terminus of a metre-gauge railway line that goes to the port of Paranaguá.

== Transportation ==
In a strategic position within a big road junction, served by seven intercity roads, being four interstates, making it a mandatory passage for those traveling by road to the Iguazu Falls in Foz do Iguaçu, and to the neighboring countries, Argentina and Paraguay. Also for those heading from South to Mato Grosso and Mato Grosso do Sul, Northwest to Santa Catarina, Rio Grande do Sul and Uruguay or West to the state capital, Curitiba, the beaches and the seaports in the coastline.

The city is served by the Regional West Airport, previously named Coronel Adalberto Mendes da Silva Airport. The airport has been named in 2022 and 2023, the best regional airport in Brazil.

== Universities ==
Cascavel is a very important college center. Besides a state university, in recent years the city became an important student hub centre, with an increasing number of private universities starting their activities in the city.

=== List of universities ===
- Universidade Estadual do Oeste do Paraná
- Universidade Paranaense
- Federal Institute of Paraná - Cascavel campus

== Sport ==
The city is home to the Autódromo Internacional de Cascavel - Zilmar Beux, racing track hosting among others the Copa Truck, Stock Car Brasil, Campeonato Brasileiro de Turismo, and the Mercedes-Benz Challenge.

The city is home to one of the top futsal clubs, Cascavel Futsal Clube, being a two-time Futsal Libertadores Cup winner.

The local association football teams are FC Cascavel and Cascavel Clube Recreativo, in the past there was also Cascavel Esporte Clube. The home of all the teams is the Estádio Olímpico Regional Arnaldo Busatto.
