= Ouro Verde do Oeste =

Coordinates: 24.805°S 53.9028°W

- Municipality
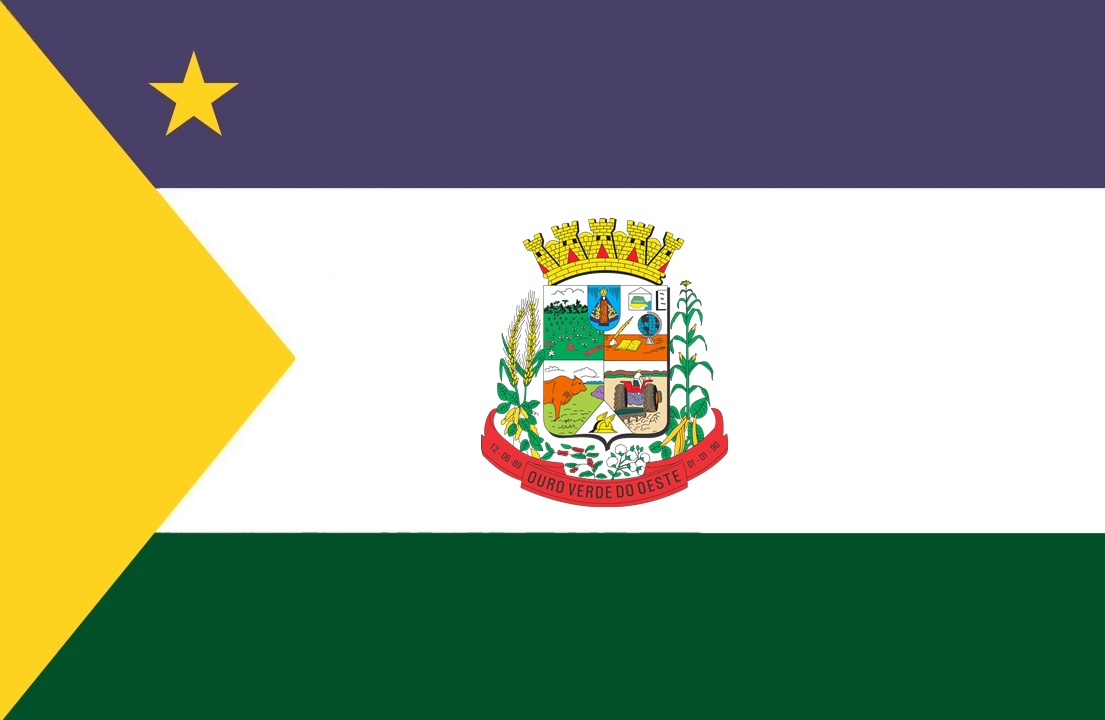
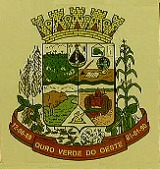
- Flag Coat of arms
- Interactive map of Ouro Verde do Oeste
- Country: Brazil
- Region: Southern
- State: Paraná
- Mesoregion: Oeste Paranaense

Population (2020)
  - Total: 6,016
- Time zone: UTC−3 (BRT)

Ouro Verde do Oeste is a municipality in the state of Paraná in the Southern Region of Brazil.

It is located close to Toledo, Parana.

== See also ==
- List of municipalities in Paraná
