= Pedrinho (footballer, born November 1994) =

Brazilian footballer

Personal information
- Full name: Pedro Felipe Ferreira Santos
- Date of birth: 23 November 1994 (age 31)
- Place of birth: Aracaju, Brazil
- Height: 1.86 m (6 ft 1 in)
- Position: Forward

Team information
- Current team: Nacional de Patos

Youth career
- 2012–2014: Internacional

Senior career*
Years	Team	Apps	(Gls)
2015	Boa Esporte	0	(0)
2016	URT	8	(0)
2017	Formosa	0	(0)
2017	Patrocinense	0	(0)
2017	Ouvidorense	0	(0)
2018–2019	Guarani (MG)	0	(0)
2019	Atlético Goianiense	4	(0)
2020	Sergipe	11	(1)
2020–2021	Nacional de Muriaé		
2021	Comercial-SP	2	(0)
2021–2022	Democrata	12	(1)
2022	Nacional de Muriaé		
2022	PFC Cajazeiras		
2022–2023	Murici	7	(1)
2023	Nacional de Muriaé		
2023–	Nacional de Patos	5	(1)
- * Club domestic league appearances and goals as of 20 August 2023

Pedro Felipe Ferreira Santos, commonly known as Pedrinho is a Brazilian footballer who plays as a forward for Nacional de Patos.

He has previously represented URT in 2016 Campeonato Brasileiro Série D.
