= São Pedro do Piauí =

Coordinates: 5°56′S 42°43′W

- Municipality
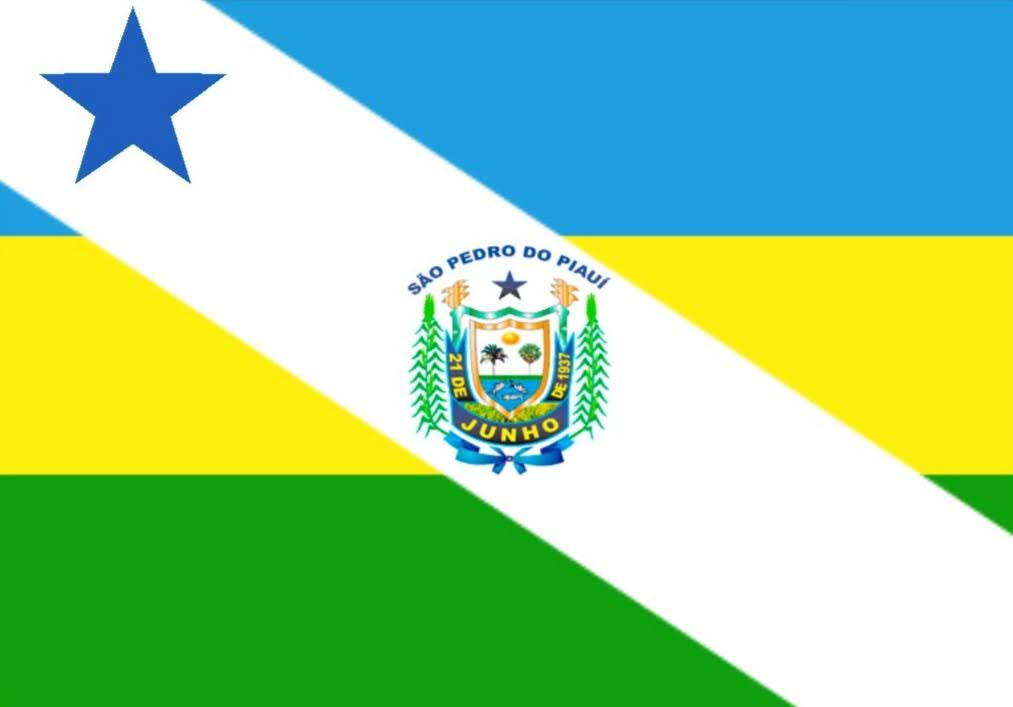
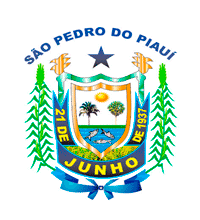
- Flag Coat of arms

- Map locator of Piauí's São Pedro do Piauí city.
- Country: Brazil
- Region: Nordeste
- State: Piauí
- Mesoregion: Centro-Norte Piauiense

Population (2020)
  - Total: 14,324
- Time zone: UTC−3 (BRT)

São Pedro do Piauí is a municipality in the state of Piauí in the Northeast region of Brazil.

== See also ==
- List of municipalities in Piauí
