= Physiotherapy Evidence Database =

Physical therapy-centered bibliographic database

Content
- Data types captured: Randomized controlled trials, systematic reviews, and clinical practice guidelines

Contact
- Research center: Institute for Musculoskeletal Health at The University of Sydney and Sydney Local Health District, Neuroscience Research Australia NeuRA
- Release date: October 1999

Access
- Website: www.pedro.org.au

The Physiotherapy Evidence Database, abbreviated PEDro, is a bibliographic database containing randomized trials, clinical practice guidelines and systematic reviews in the field of physical therapy. It was established in October 1999 and is maintained by the Institute for Musculoskeletal Health a The University of Sydney and Sydney Local Health District. As of August 2024, there were more than 61,000 entries indexed on PEDro.

== Scale ==
The website also uses a scale, known as the PEDro scale, to assess the quality of randomized trials included in the database. Trials with higher PEDro scores are displayed first in PEDro search results. A 2010 study found preliminary evidence that this scale, as well as eight of its ten individual items, had validity.
