= São Pedro do Iguaçu =

- Municipality
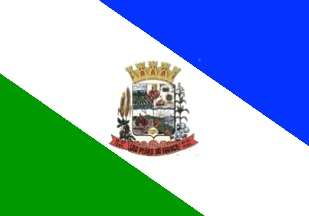
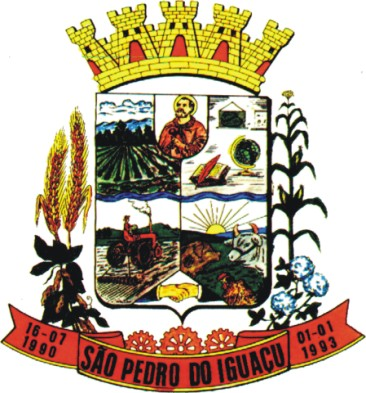
- Flag Coat of arms

- Location in Brazil
- Coordinates: 24°56′9″S 53°51′18″W
- Country: Brazil
- Region: Southern
- State: Paraná
- Mesoregion: Oeste Paranaense

Population (2020)
  - Total: 5,820
- Time zone: UTC−3 (BRT)

São Pedro do Iguaçu is a municipality in the state of Paraná in the Southern Region of Brazil.

== See also ==
- List of municipalities in Paraná
