= Calabazas, Yabucoa, Puerto Rico =

Barrio of Puerto Rico

Calabazas
- Barrio
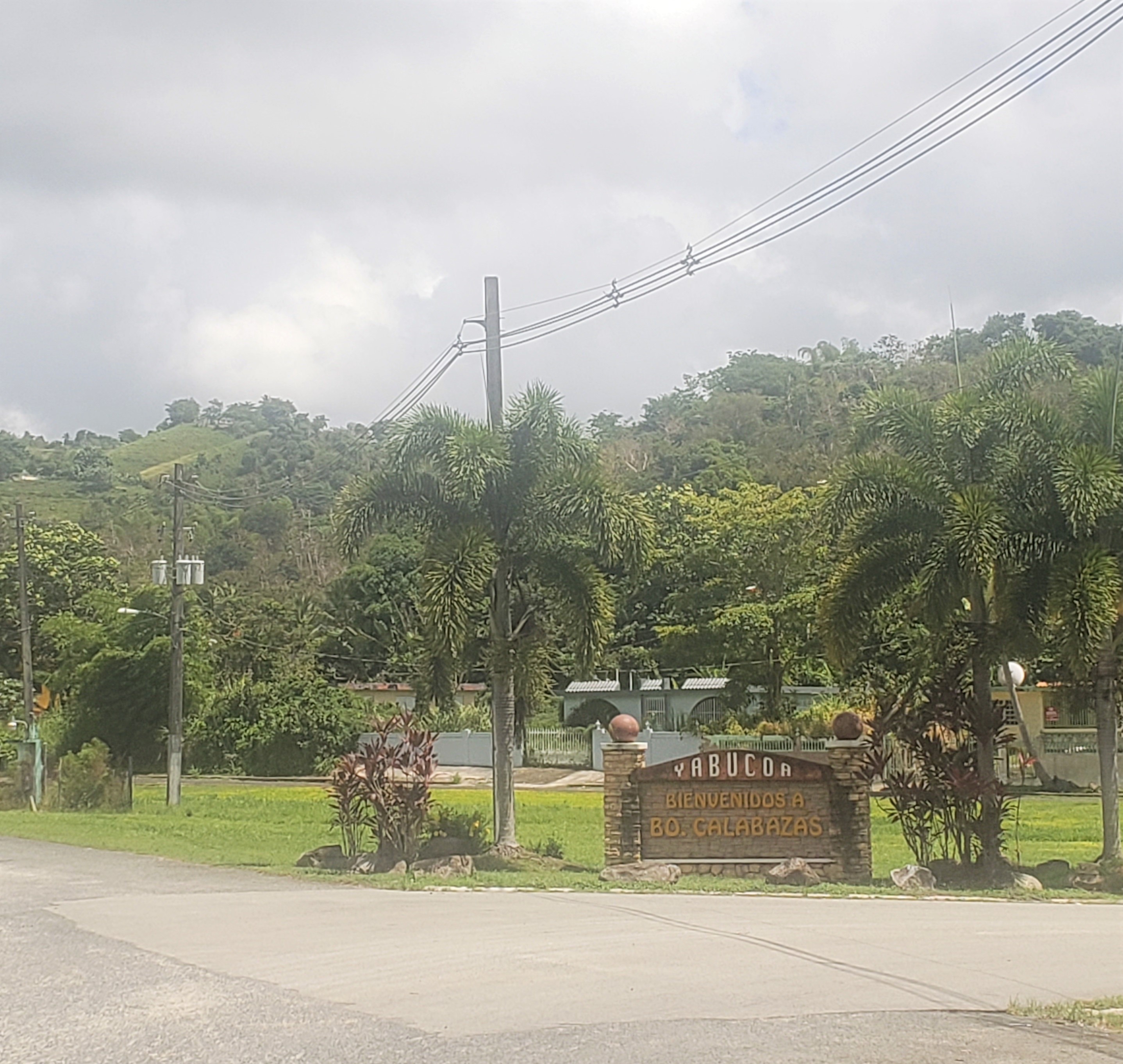
- Rock wall at Calabazas barrio in Yabucoa

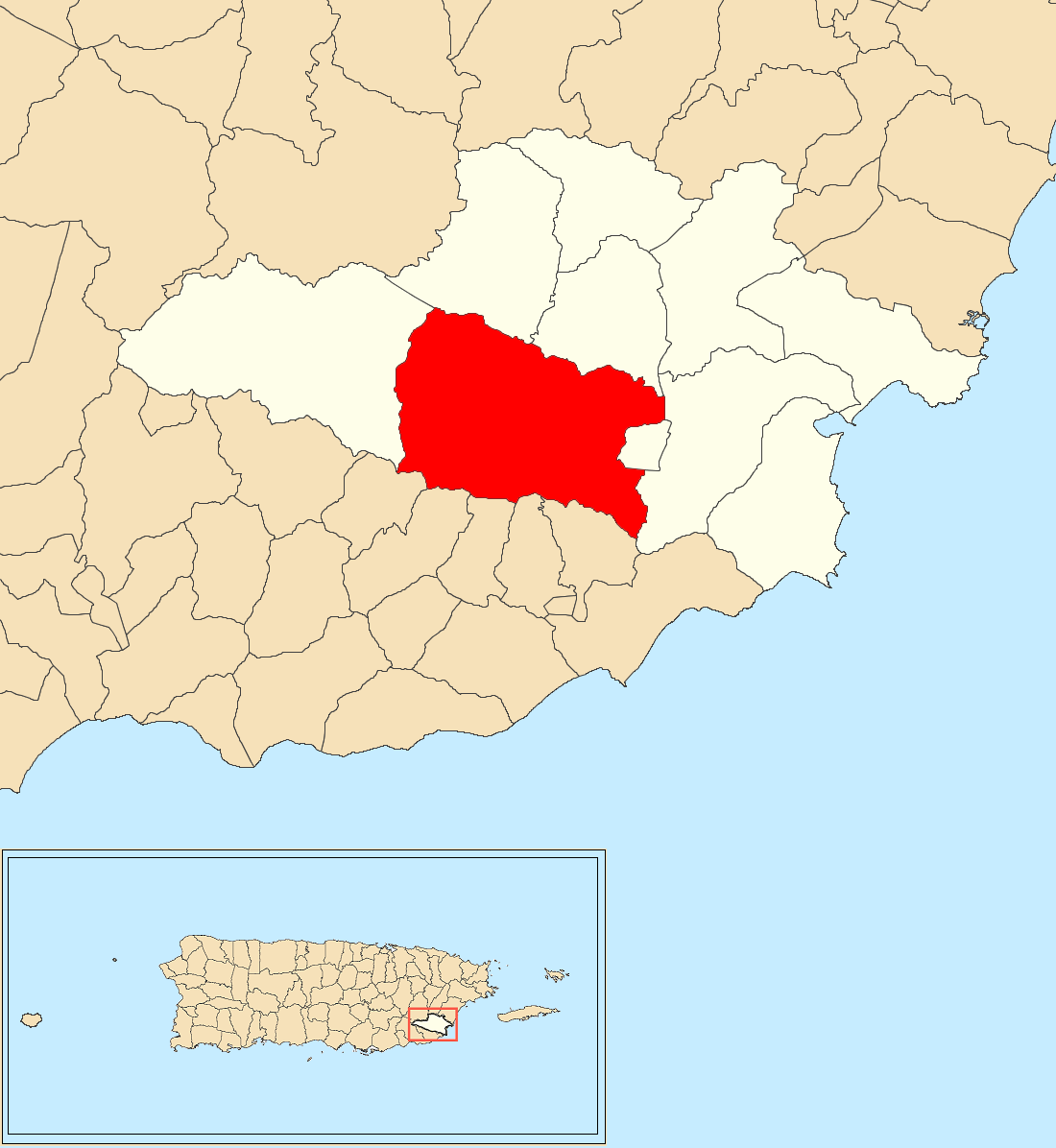
- Location of Calabazas within the municipality of Yabucoa shown in red

- Location of Puerto Rico
- Coordinates: 18°03′16″N 65°54′43″W
- Commonwealth: Puerto Rico
- Municipality: Yabucoa

Area
  - Total: 10.46 sq mi (27.1 km^{2})
  - Land: 10.46 sq mi (27.1 km^{2})
  - Water: 0 sq mi (0 km^{2})
- Elevation: 66 ft (20 m)

Population (2010)
  - Total: 7,675
  - Density: 733.7/sq mi (283.3/km^{2})
- Source: 2010 Census
- Time zone: UTC−4 (AST)
- ZIP Code: 00767
- Area code: 787/939

Calabazas is a barrio in the municipality of Yabucoa, Puerto Rico. Its population in 2010 was 7,675.

== History ==
Calabazas was in Spain's gazetteers until Puerto Rico was ceded by Spain in the aftermath of the Spanish–American War under the terms of the Treaty of Paris of 1898 and became an unincorporated territory of the United States. In 1899, the United States Department of War conducted a census of Puerto Rico finding that the population of Calabazas barrio was 1,891.

Historical population
Census	Pop.	Note	%±
1900	1,891		—
1910	2,737		44.7%
1920	2,842		3.8%
1930	3,690		29.8%
1940	4,577		24.0%
1950	4,564		−0.3%
1960	6,390		40.0%
1970	0		−100.0%
1980	7,146		—
1990	7,801		9.2%
2000	7,998		2.5%
2010	7,675		−4.0%
U.S. Decennial Census; 1899 (shown as 1900) 1910-1930; 1930-1950 1980-2000 2010

== Sectors ==
Barrios (which are, in contemporary times, roughly comparable to minor civil divisions) in turn are further subdivided into smaller local populated place areas/units called sectores (sectors in English). The types of sectores may vary, from normally sector to urbanización to reparto to barriada to residencial, among others.

The following sectors are in Calabazas barrio:

Carretera 900, Parcelas Nuevas, Sector Calabazas Arriba, Sector Guayabo, Sector Playita Arriba, Sector Playita, Sector Rincón, Sector Sodoma o Calabazas Adentro, Sector Vieques, Sector Villa Kilí, Sector y Parcelas Rosa Sánchez, Urbanización Jaime C. Rodríguez, Urbanización Santa María, and Urbanización Valles de las Calabazas.

== See also ==
- List of communities in Puerto Rico
- List of barrios and sectors of Yabucoa, Puerto Rico
