= San Cristóbal Canyon =

Canyon in Puerto Rico

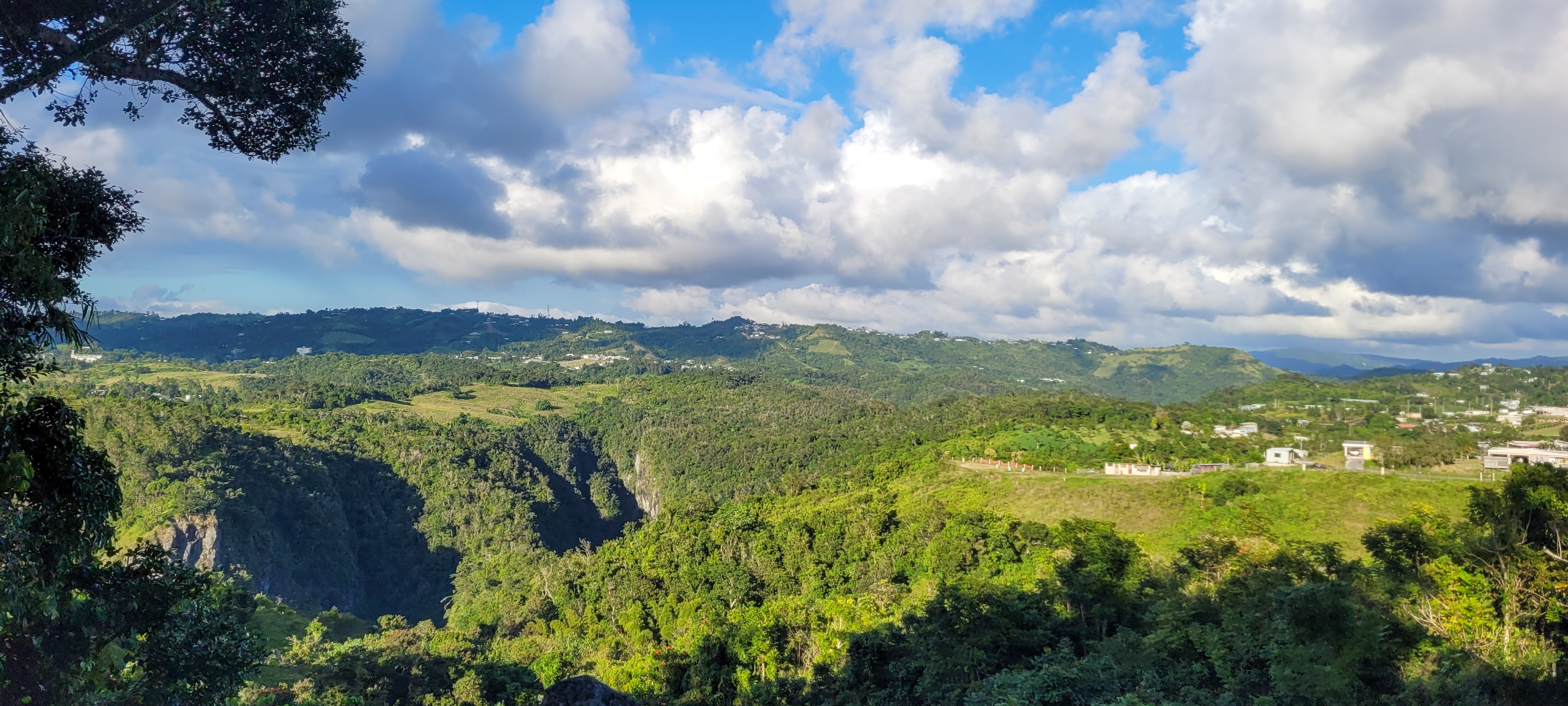
- San Cristóbal Canyon in 2022

- Location within Puerto Rico
- Floor elevation: Approx. 2,140 feet (700 m)
- Length: 6.52 miles (10.49 km)
- Width: 0.07 to 0.77 miles (0.11 to 1.24 km)
- Depth: Approx. 800 feet (200 m)

Geography
- Location: Aibonito and Barranquitas, Puerto Rico
- Coordinates: 18°10′N 66°17′W
- Rivers: Usabón River and tributaries: Aibonito and Barranquitas Rivers, and Helechal and Alicia Creeks
- Interactive map of San Cristóbal Canyon

San Cristóbal Canyon (Spanish: Cañón de San Cristóbal) is a canyon carved by the Usabón River, located on the town boundary between the municipalities of Barranquitas and Aibonito in the central region of the main island of Puerto Rico. Situated between the mountain subranges of Cordillera Central and Sierra de Cayey, San Cristóbal measures 9 kilometers (5.5 mi) in length and reaches up to 750 feet (228.6 m) in depth, making it the deepest land canyon in Puerto Rico and the West Indies in the Caribbean. Home to some of the tallest waterfalls and hundreds of species of flora and fauna in the island, the canyon is government-protected as a natural area since 1978, which came after the site was used as a land fill from 1954 to 1974. San Cristóbal and its northerly neighbor of Las Bocas Canyon are part of a larger canyon system belonging to the La Plata River basin in the central mountainous region of Puerto Rico.

== Geography ==
The San Cristóbal Canyon is mainly carved by the flow of the Usabón River, an eastward tributary of the La Plata River (Río de la Plata), which at approximately 46 miles (74 km) is the longest river in Puerto Rico. The river flow of the Usabón is fed by numerous tributaries, particularly the Aibonito and Barranquitas Rivers, which flow from the south and north of the canyon, respectively. These rivers are named after the municipalities they originate from, to which the Usabón functions as a natural municipal boundary. This river system, along with its wider hydrological basin of La Plata, have sculpted the canyonlands of the eastern Cordillera Central of Puerto Rico. This process has created numerous waterfalls, some of which are the tallest in Puerto Rico. For example, La Vaca Falls (Salto La Vaca), at approximately 300 feet (91.4 m), is the tallest waterfall in the island. This canyon system is much bigger than the San Cristóbal and Las Bocas Canyons, and it includes other gorges and steep river valleys such as those of La Plata in Comerío and Arroyata in Cidra. This canyon is notable for being the deepest canyon in the West Indies with a maximum depth of up to 800 feet (200 m).

== Geology ==
Before the flow of the Usabón River, the area where the San Cristóbal Canyon is located was the location of a former fault line during the Late Cretaceous period. This fault line might have contributed to the inward flow of previous rivers by creating a depression next to a rise of the superficial terrestrial crust along the region which began the process of carving the gorge approximately 90 million years ago. This hydrological process caused the movement of sediments which today are evident in the rich diversity of soil types that are found in the area.

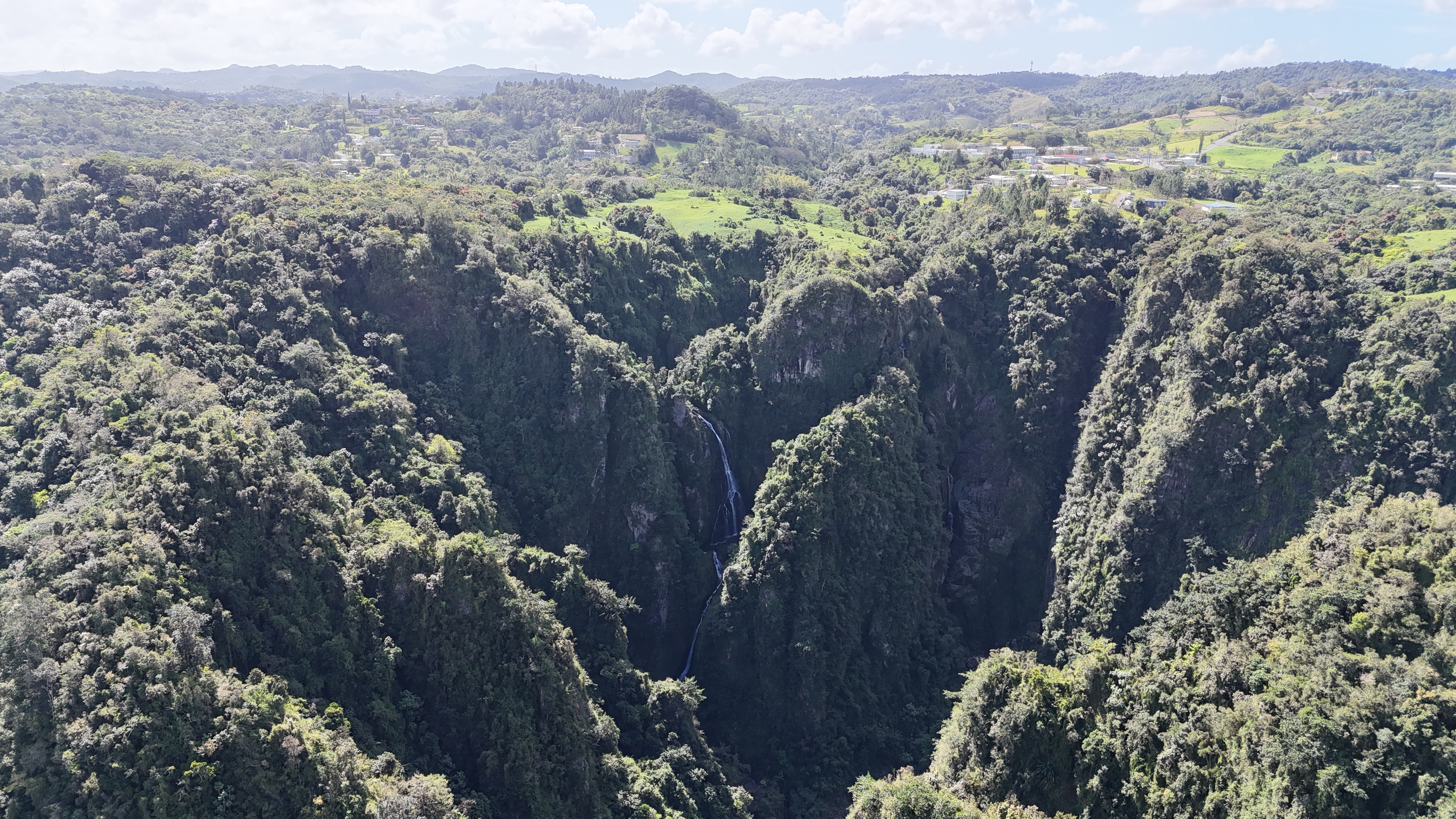
El Ancón Waterfall in San Cristóbal Canyon, Puerto Rico

== History ==
The San Cristóbal Canyon is named after Saint Christopher, a 3rd-century Christian martyr and the patron saint of travelers. The ecological systems found within the canyon had been untouched by humans until the 19th century when the increased agricultural activities of the surrounding mountains affected the sediment flow of the Usabón River. Despite its ecological and geological significance, the canyon was often used as a garbage dump throughout much of the 20th century and, beginning in 1954, it became a landfill. It was not until 1974 that the landfill was officially closed but, by that time, these processes had irreversibly altered the ecosystem of the canyon, and by the second half of the 20th century, the canyon had greatly lost its biological and hydrological integrity. In 1978 the Puerto Rico Department of Natural and Environmental Resources (DRNA in Spanish) identified the canyon as one of the 28 areas across Puerto Rico that were suitable for protection under Law 150 Section 5, which ensures the protection of areas of great biological, ecological and geographical importance. Additionally, the Puerto Rico Planning Board approved further restrictions on housing development in the region surrounding the canyon in 1980. The newly protected area was granted to the Puerto Rico Conservation Trust which became responsible for the cleanup, revitalization and protection of the canyon. Additional revitalization and scientific surveys were carried out by students from the Interamerican University of Puerto Rico in Barranquitas. The canyon became a regional tourist attraction during the 1980s with small, guided tours to the canyon becoming popular, in addition to the area receiving recreational attention due to its numerous natural pools (charcas) and opportunities for rappelling, rock climbing and other adventure sports. With the development of Para La Naturaleza, a non-governmental managing organization established by the Puerto Rico Conservation Trust in 2013, the canyon and its surroundings were proclaimed a Protected Natural Area (Área natural protegida) and one of the 39 nature reserves of Puerto Rico.

== San Cristóbal Canyon Protected Natural Area ==
The San Cristóbal Canyon Protected Natural Area (Área natural protegida del Cañón de San Cristóbal) is a Protected Natural Area and nature reserve located across the span of the San Cristóbal Canyon and its surroundings in the municipalities of Aibonito and Barranquitas. The San Cristóbal Canyon Protected Natural Area has an extension of 6,881 acres, out of which 3,106 acres are protected under more rigorous laws as a nature reserve. The Puerto Rico Conservation Trust manages two-thirds of the protected area while the municipalities of Barranquitas and Aibonito manage the rest; the organization Para La Naturaleza manages the clerical, tourist and recreational activities of the area while also promoting the conservation and scientific activities that take place in the form of trach-collection tours and bird-labeling and counting.

=== Ecology ===
The steep gorges and rich diversity of soil types across the canyon provide a unique animal and plant habitat that is uncommon throughout Puerto Rico. The canyon is home to around 695 species of plants and 144 species of animals, many of which are endemic to the island and some of which are listed as endangered species which are now protected under the United States Endangered Species Act of 1973.

=== Tourism ===
The official points of entry into the protected area are Finca Don Félix and the Cañón San Cristóbal Recreation Area in Barranquitas, and Finca Los Llanos in Aibonito, all managed by Para La Naturaleza. The former coffee plantation of Finca Don Félix, located near Helechal, Barranquitas, provides access to numerous charcos, such as Charco Azul, and waterfalls such as El Negrón, La Niebla and El Ancón waterfalls; additionally, it contains hiking trails that provide access to the northeastern rim of the canyon. Cañón San Cristóbal Recreation Area is the closest point of entry from Barranquitas Pueblo, and it contains a native tree nursery in addition to a hiking trail that provides access to Mirador Suñé, a scenic lookout. Finca Los Llanos, located near Aibonito Pueblo, provides access to the southern rim of the canyon.

Para La Naturaleza also owns and manages Casa Laboy, a historic residence that serves as management offices and a contact point for scientists, researchers and visitors.

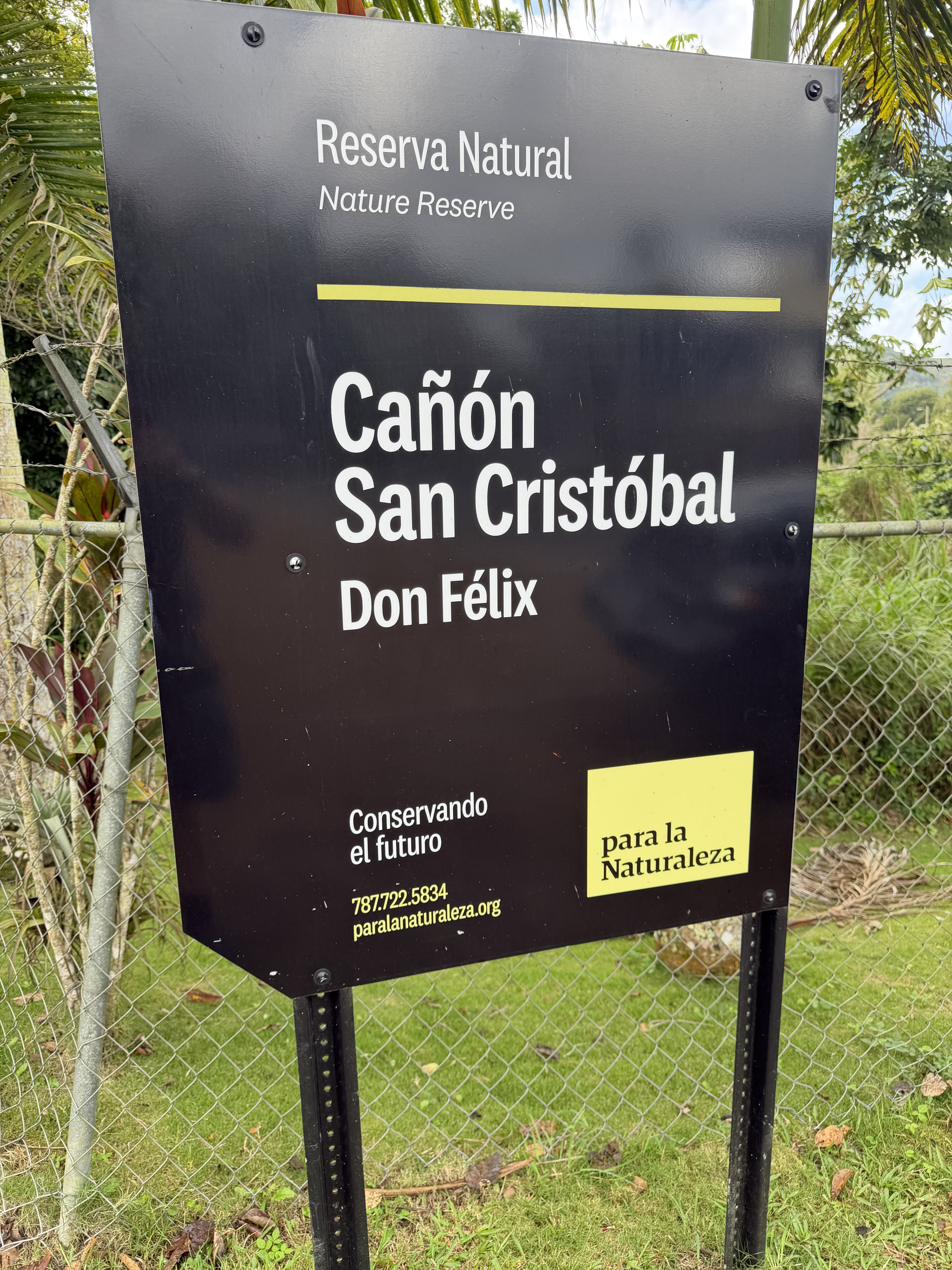
The Entrance to San Cristóbal Canyon Nature Preserve, Puerto Rico

== See also ==
- Geography of Puerto Rico
- Geology of Puerto Rico
- List of protected areas of Puerto Rico
