= List of barrios and sectors of Aibonito, Puerto Rico =

Like all municipalities of Puerto Rico, Aibonito is subdivided into administrative units called barrios, which are, in contemporary times, roughly comparable to minor civil divisions. The barrios and subbarrios, in turn, are further subdivided into smaller local populated place areas/units called sectores (sectors in English). The types of sectores may vary, from normally sector to urbanización to reparto to barriada to residencial, among others. Some sectors appear in two barrios.

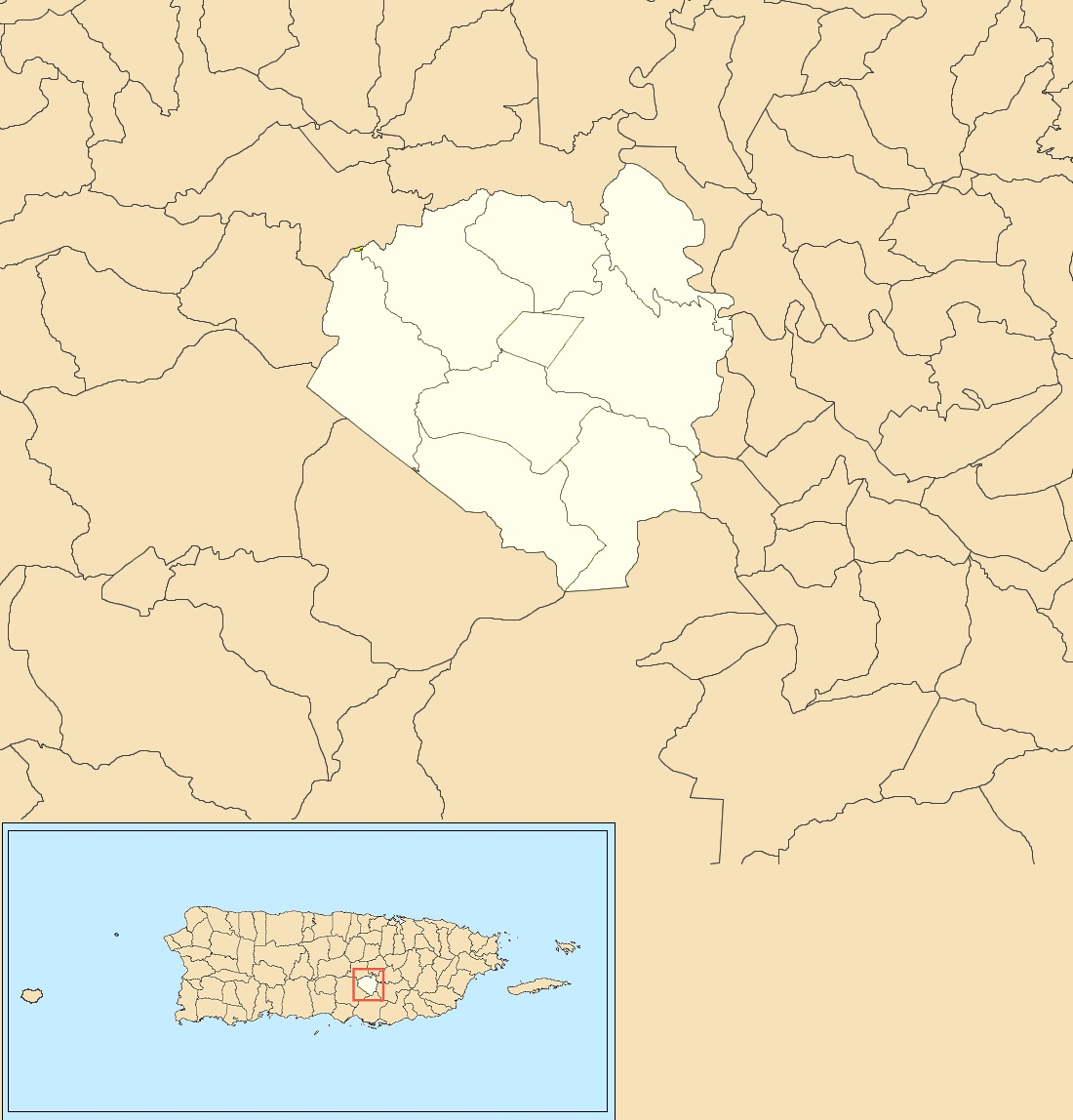
Aibonito map with barrio subdivisions

== List of sectors by barrio ==
=== Aibonito barrio-pueblo ===
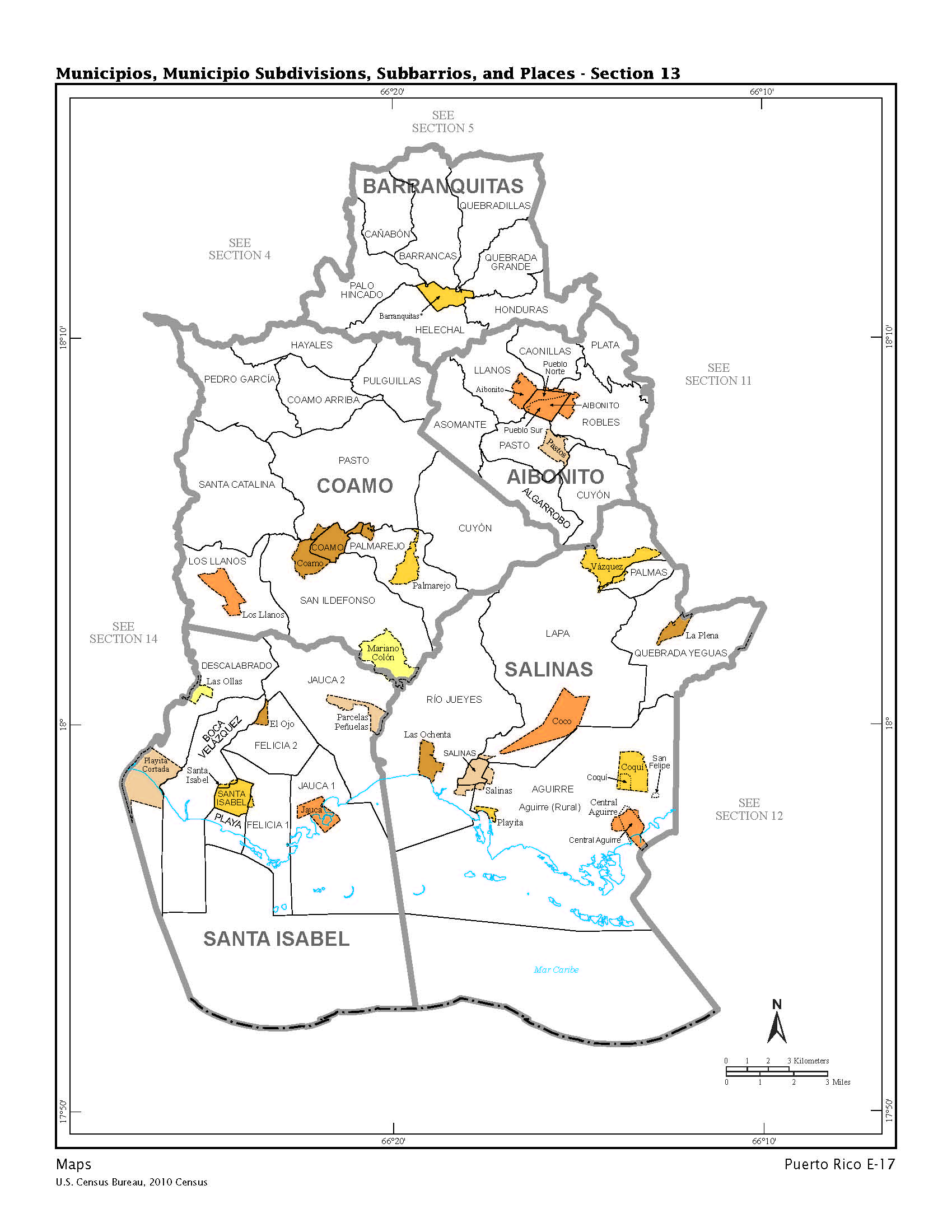
US 2010 Census map of subdivisions of Aibonito, and some neighboring municipalities

- Pueblo Norte
- Pueblo Sur
- Urbanización Buena Vista

=== Algarrobo ===
- Carretera 717
- Sector Húcares
- Sector Subida

=== Asomante ===
- Alturas de Asomante
- Comunidad Asomante
- Estancias Asomante
- Hogar Dulce Vida
- Lomas de Aibonito
- Parcelas Cuadritos
- Parcelas Emanuelli
- Sector Bejucos
- Sector Cristian Belén
- Sector El Cerro
- Sector El Nueve
- Sector Esparra
- Sector Las Abejas
- Sector Los Llanos
- Sector Los Cuadritos
- Sector Los Mangós
- Sector Los Ranchetes
- Sector Los Reyes
- Sector Sabana
- Sector Serrallés
- Sector Subida Asomante
- Urbanización Jatibonito
- Urbanización Mansiones de Asomante
- Urbanización Praderas de Aibonito
- Urbanización Praderas de Asomante

=== Caonillas ===
- Desvío Robles
- La Vega
- Parcelas Nuevas
- Parcelas Viejas
- Sector Bambúa
- Sector Bejucos
- Sector Corea
- Sector El Coquí
- Sector Escuelas
- Sector La Tea
- Sector Quenepo
- Sector Verdún

=== Cuyón ===
- Carretera 162
- Carretera 716
- Cuyón I y II
- Sector Boquerón
- Sector El Fresar
- Sector Gallardo Abajo
- Sector Jagüeyes
- Sector Ratones
- Sector Rincón
- Sector Vertero

=== Llanos ===
- Barriada San Luis
- Barrio Caonillas Oeste
- Barrio Llanos Carretera
- Barrio Llanos Rural Adentro
- Carretera 162
- Carretera 725
- Estancias del Llano
- Extensión San Luis
- Panoramas Aibonito
- Parcelas Nuevas
- Paseo Lajita
- Reparto Quiñones
- Residencial Golden Village
- Residencial Villa de la Rosa
- Sector El Cerro
- Sector El Juicio
- Sector El Patio
- Sector La Españolita
- Sector Las Abejas
- Sector Loma del Viento
- Sector Los Llanos
- Sector Mondragón
- Sector Paseo Los Pinos
- Sector Saturnino
- Sector Toronjo
- Sector Usabón
- Urbanización Colinas del Paraíso
- Urbanización Colinas de San Francisco
- Urbanización Santa Ana

=== Pasto ===
- Carretera 162
- Carretera 718
- Comunidad Monte Verde
- Comunidad Yura
- Hacienda Camila
- Parcelas Nuevas
- Parcelas Viejas
- Sector Bejuco
- Sector Cuchilla
- Sector Cuesta Blanca
- Sector La Playita
- Sector La Torre
- Sector Los Cardín
- Sector Palomas
- Sector Pasto
- Urbanización Las Delicias
- Urbanización Paseo de Algarrobo
- Urbanización Paseo de la Reina
- Villas de Algarrobo

=== Plata ===
- Carretera 727
- Carretera 728
- La Tuca
- Sector Amoldaderos
- Sector Empalme
- Sector Escuelas
- Sector Fraternidad
- Sector Hoyo Frío
- Sector Hoyo Oscura
- Sector La Calle
- Sector La Cantera
- Sector La Parada
- Sector Los Chorritos
- Sector Los Muros
- Sector Naguita
- Urbanización Paseo del Plata
- Urbanización Valle de la Plata

=== Robles ===
- Barrio Robles Centro
- Calle Mercedita Serrallés
- Carretera 722
- Condominio Casa Aibonito
- Desvío Robles
- Extensión Bella Vista
- Extensión San José
- Hogar Aurora
- Parcelas Rabanal
- Poblado Muñoz Rivera
- Reparto Robles
- Residencial Liborio Ortiz
- Residencial Villa Verde
- Ruta Panorámica 7722
- Sector Campito
- Sector Concretera
- Sector El Castillo
- Sector La Base
- Sector La Ceiba
- Sector La Loma
- Sector Mameyes
- Sector Manresa
- Sector Pangola
- Sector Rabanal
- Sector Represa
- Sector Sierra
- Tramo Calle San José (Carretera 14)
- Urbanización Bella Vista
- Urbanización Brisas de Aibonito
- Urbanización Buena Vista
- Urbanización Campo Rey
- Urbanización La Providencia (Pangola)
- Urbanización Las Flores
- Urbanización Las Mercedes
- Urbanización Las Quintas
- Urbanización Monte Carlo
- Urbanización San José
- Urbanización Villa Coquí
- Urbanización Villa Rosales
- Villa Panorámica

== See also ==
- List of communities in Puerto Rico
