= Puerto Rico Highway 162 =

Highway in Puerto Rico

Highway 162
- Ruta 162

Route information
- Maintained by Puerto Rico DTPW
- Length: 19.0 km (11.8 mi)
- Existed: 1953–present

Major junctions
- South end: PR-1 in Cuyón
- PR-718 in Pasto–Cuyón; PR-722 / PR-7718 in Pasto–Robles; PR-14 in Aibonito barrio-pueblo; PR-725 in Aibonito barrio-pueblo; PR-724 in Aibonito barrio-pueblo; PR-14 in Pasto–Llanos–Asomante; PR-725 in Asomante–Llanos; PR-719 in Helechal; PR-558 in Helechal; PR-143 in Helechal
- North end: PR-156 in Barranquitas barrio-pueblo

Location
- Country: United States
- Territory: Puerto Rico
- Municipalities: Aibonito, Barranquitas

Highway system
- Roads in Puerto Rico; List
← PR-161	→ PR-163

Puerto Rico Highway 162 (PR-162) is a road that travels from Aibonito, Puerto Rico to Barranquitas. This highway begins at its intersection with PR-1 in Cuyón and ends at its junction with PR-156 in downtown Barranquitas.

Puerto Rico Highway 162 by municipality

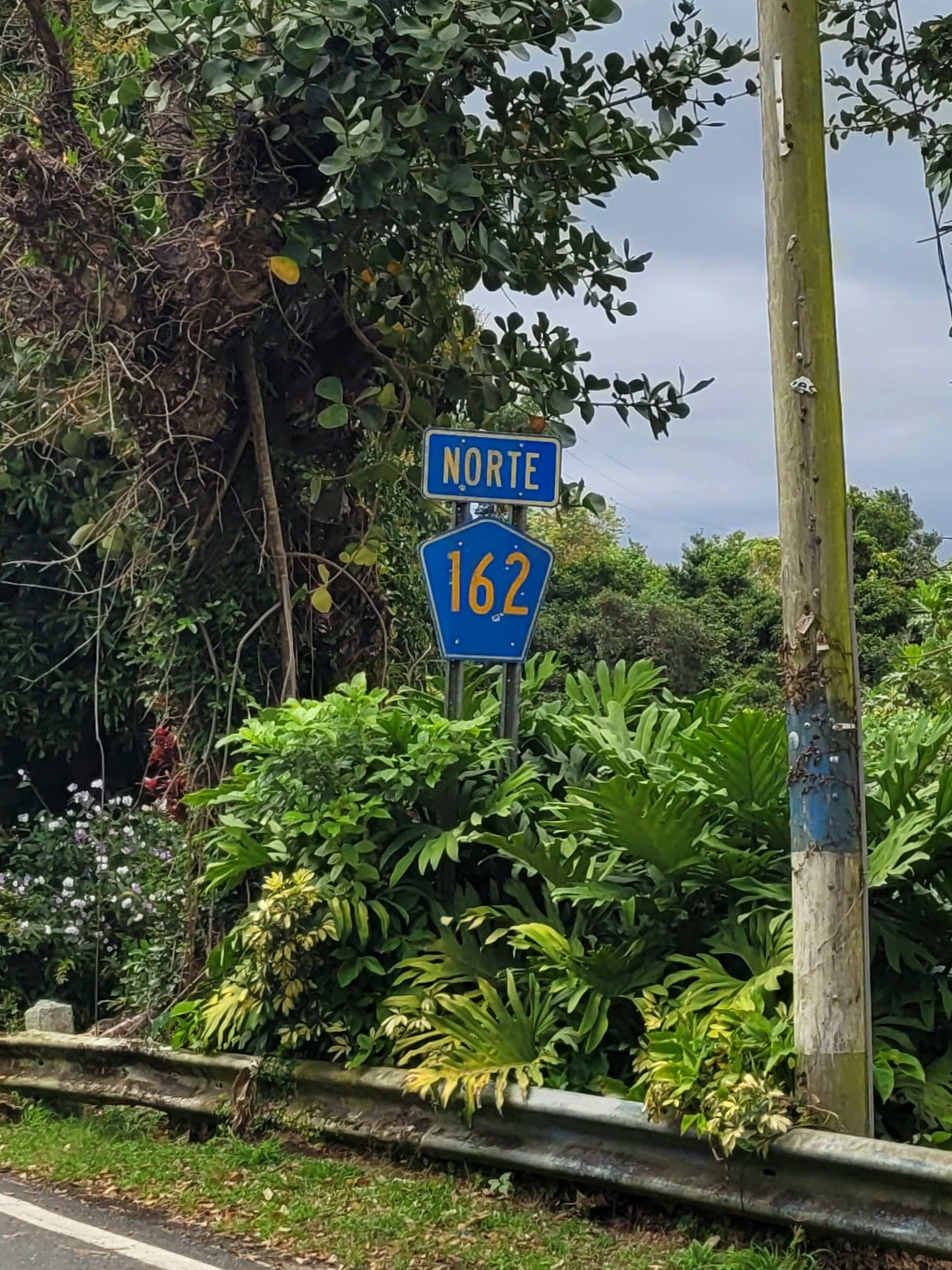
Northbound sign in Aibonito

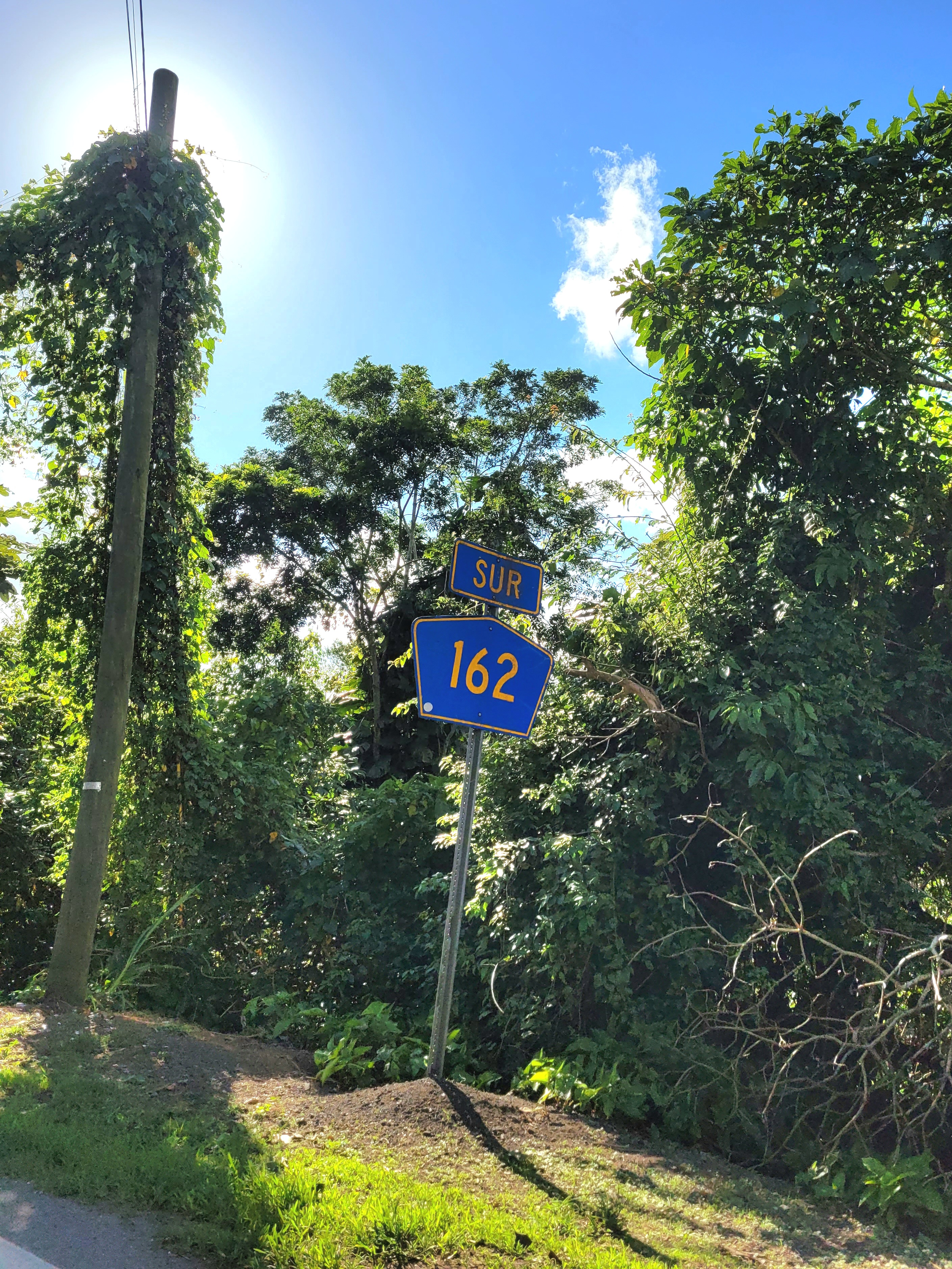
Southbound sign in Helechal, Barranquitas

== Major intersections ==
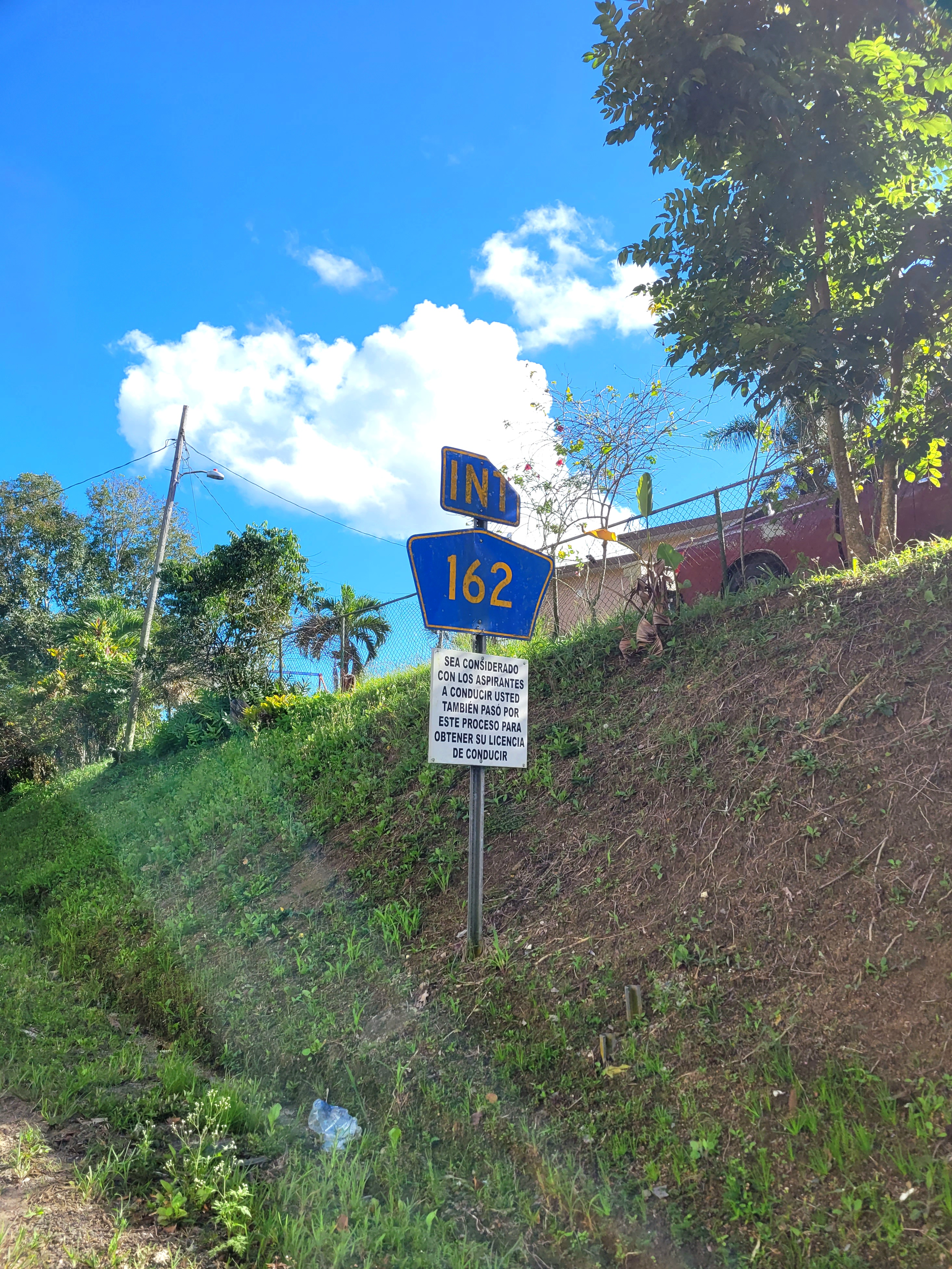
PR-143 east near PR-162 junction in Helechal, Barranquitas

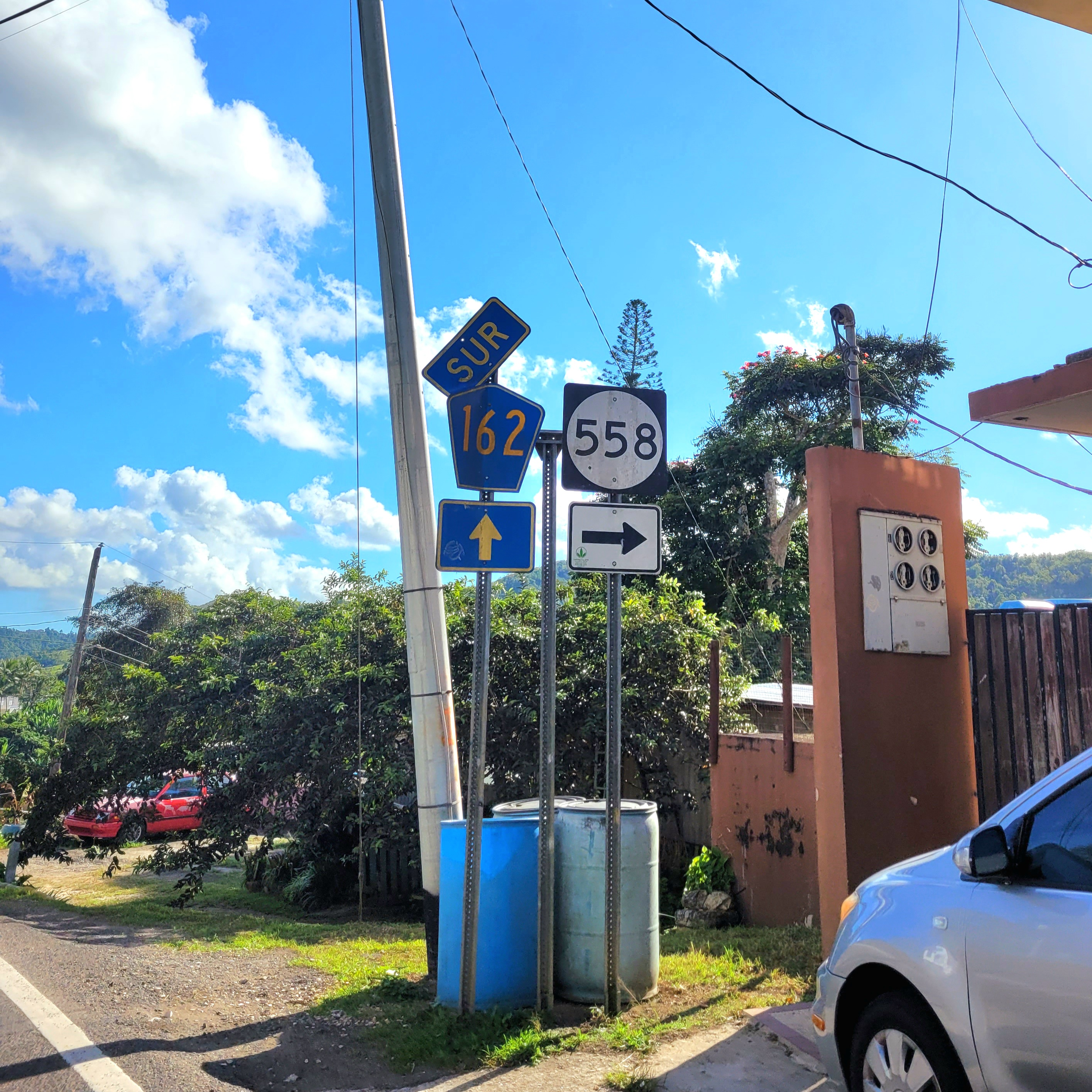
PR-162 south at PR-558 intersection in Helechal, Barranquitas

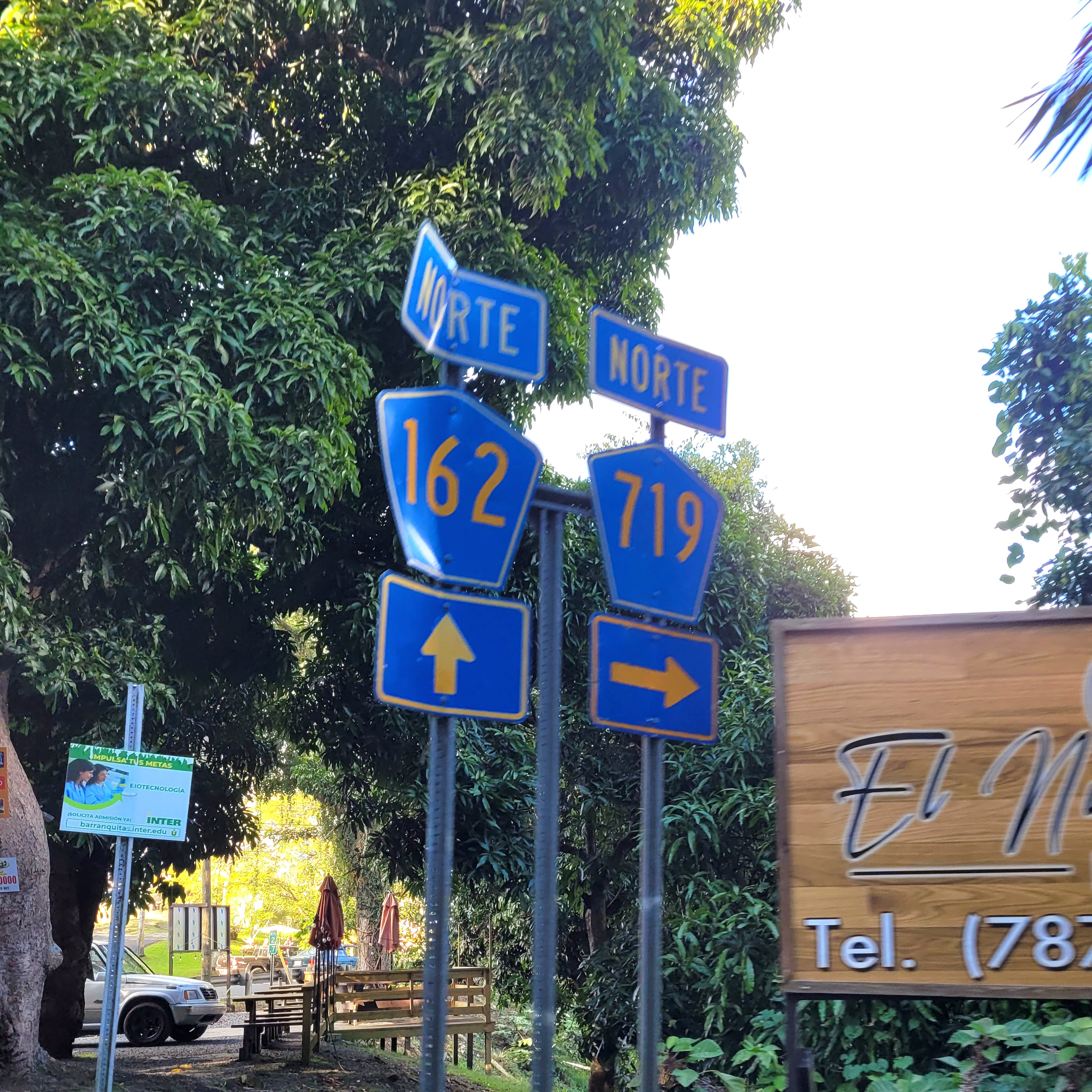
PR-162 north at PR-719 intersection in Helechal, Barranquitas

Municipality	Location	km	mi	Destinations	Notes
Aibonito	Cuyón	0.0	0.0	PR-1 – Cayey, Salinas	Southern terminus of PR-162
Aibonito	Cuyón	3.1	1.9	PR-716 – Cuyón	
Aibonito	Pasto–Cuyón line	4.9	3.0	PR-718 – Pasto	
Aibonito	Pasto–Robles line	6.4	4.0	PR-722 east (Ruta Panorámica) / PR-7718 west (Paseo Don Julio Francisco "Paco" Santos Vázquez) – Cayey, Coamo	
Aibonito	Aibonito barrio-pueblo	7.8	4.8	PR-721 – Aibonito	
Aibonito	Aibonito barrio-pueblo	8.5 50.3 (Note: Kilometer markers represent the distance along PR-14 rather than PR-162.)	5.3 31.3	PR-14 east (Avenida San José) – Cayey	Eastern terminus of PR-14 concurrency; one-way street; eastbound access via Calle Gerónimo Martínez; the Carretera Central continues toward Cayey
Aibonito	See PR-14				
Aibonito	Pasto–Llanos– Asomante tripoint	47.3 8.6	29.4 5.3	PR-14 west (Carretera Central) – Coamo	Western terminus of PR-14 concurrency; the Carretera Central continues toward Coamo
Aibonito	Asomante–Llanos line	12.3– 12.4	7.6– 7.7	PR-725 – Llanos	
Aibonito	Asomante–Llanos line	12.8– 12.9	8.0– 8.0	PR-7062 – Asomante	Unsigned
Barranquitas	Helechal	15.3– 15.4	9.5– 9.6	PR-719 north (Vía Los Torcheros) – Barranquitas	
Barranquitas	Helechal	15.9	9.9	PR-558 – Pulguillas	
Barranquitas	Helechal	16.4	10.2	PR-143 – Adjuntas	
Barranquitas	Barranquitas barrio-pueblo	19.0	11.8	PR-156 (Calle Antonio R. Barceló) – Orocovis, Comerío	Northern terminus of PR-162
1.000 mi = 1.609 km; 1.000 km = 0.621 mi: Concurrency terminus; Incomplete access

== See also ==
- 1953 Puerto Rico highway renumbering
