= Cuyón =

Cuyón may refer to:

== Places ==
- Cuyón, Aibonito, Puerto Rico, a barrio in Aibonito, Puerto Rico
- Cuyón River, a river in the U.S. commonwealth of Puerto Rico
- Cuyón, Coamo, Puerto Rico, a barrio in Coamo, Puerto Rico
