= Llanos, Aibonito, Puerto Rico =

Barrio of Puerto Rico

Llanos
- Barrio
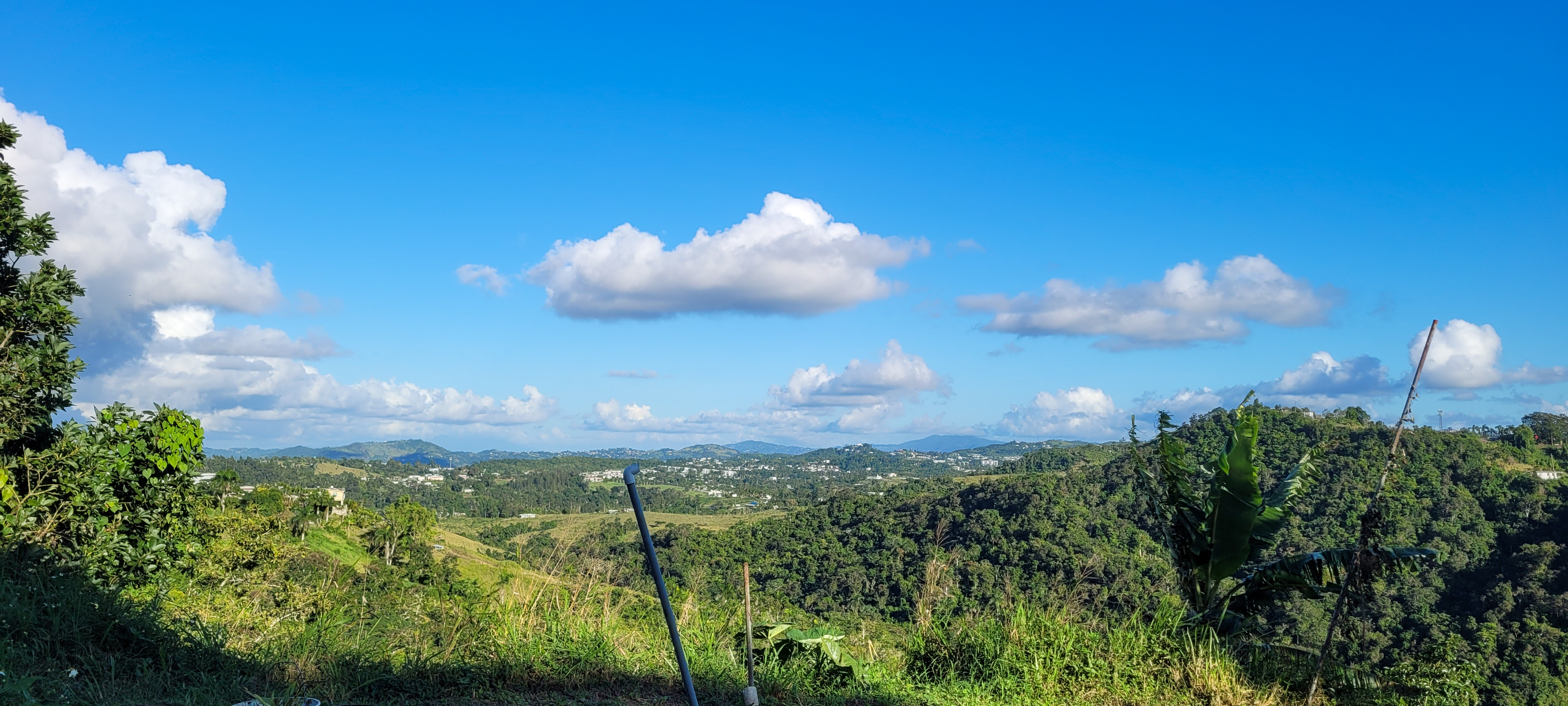
- View from Llanos

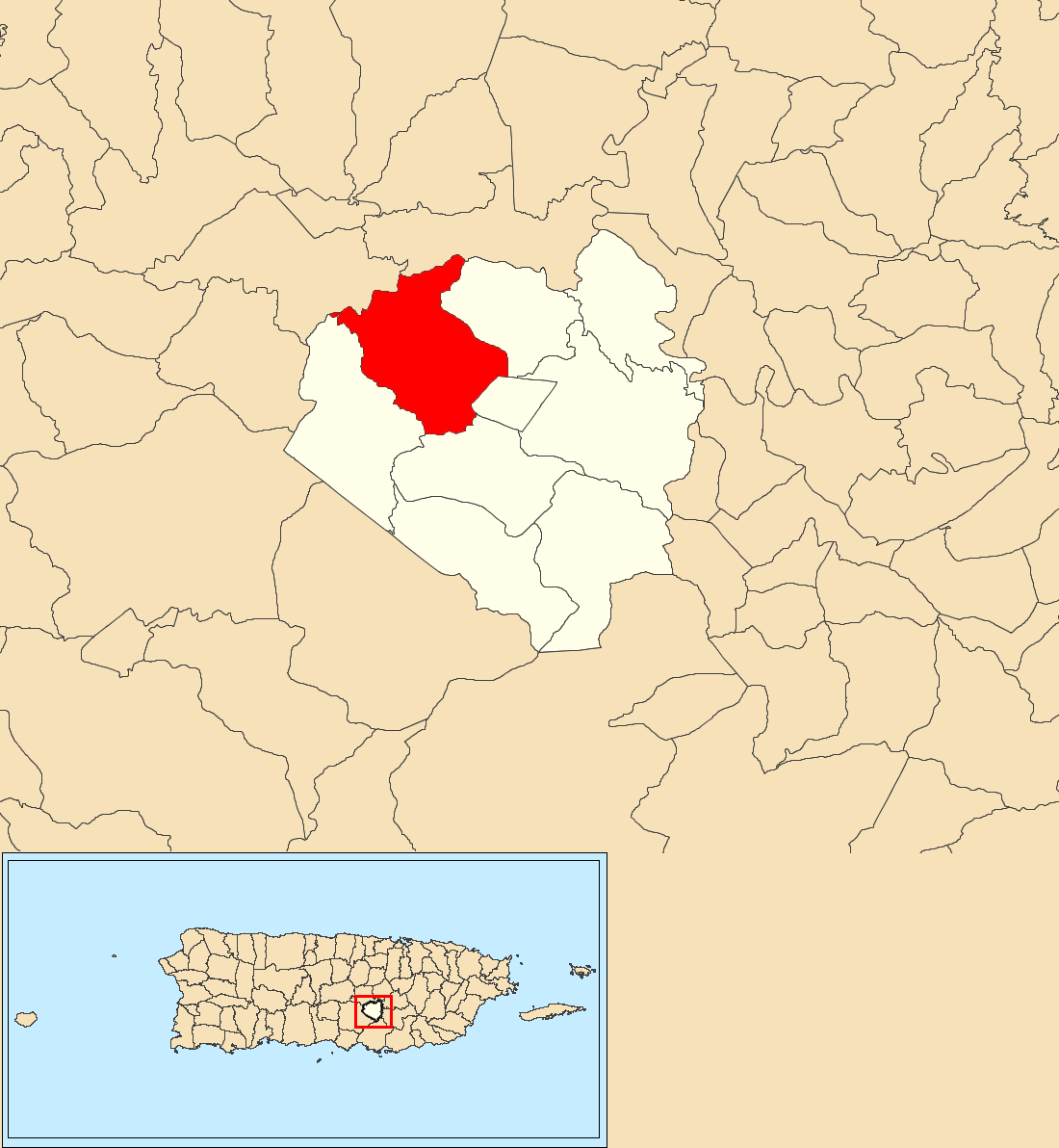
- Location of Llanos within the municipality of Aibonito shown in red

- Location of Puerto Rico
- Coordinates: 18°08′55″N 66°17′02″W
- Commonwealth: Puerto Rico
- Municipality: Aibonito

Area
  - Total: 4.30 sq mi (11.1 km^{2})
  - Land: 4.29 sq mi (11.1 km^{2})
  - Water: 0.01 sq mi (0.026 km^{2})
- Elevation: 1,932 ft (589 m)

Population (2010)
  - Total: 6,840
  - Density: 1,594.4/sq mi (615.6/km^{2})
- Source: 2010 Census
- Time zone: UTC−4 (AST)

Llanos is a barrio in the municipality of Aibonito, Puerto Rico. Its population in 2010 was 6,840.

== History ==
Llanos was in Spain's gazetteers until Puerto Rico was ceded by Spain in the aftermath of the Spanish–American War under the terms of the Treaty of Paris of 1898 and became an unincorporated territory of the United States. In 1899, the United States Department of War conducted a census of Puerto Rico finding that the combined population of Llanos and Algarrobo barrios was 1,226.

Historical population
Census	Pop.	Note	%±
1910	964		—
1920	1,194		23.9%
1930	1,849		54.9%
1940	1,975		6.8%
1950	3,489		76.7%
1960	3,153		−9.6%
1970	0		−100.0%
1980	4,516		—
1990	5,601		24.0%
2000	6,921		23.6%
2010	6,840		−1.2%
U.S. Decennial Census; 1900 (N/A) 1910-1930; 1930-1950 1980-2000 2010

== Sectors ==
Barrios (which are, in contemporary times, roughly comparable to minor civil divisions) in turn are further subdivided into smaller local populated place areas/units called sectores (sectors in English). The types of sectores may vary, from normally sector to urbanización to reparto to barriada to residencial, among others.

The following sectors are in Llanos barrio:

Barriada San Luis, Barrio Caonillas Oeste, Barrio Llanos Carretera, Barrio Llanos Rural Adentro, Carretera 162, Carretera 725, Estancias del Llano, Extensión San Luis, Panoramas Aibonito, Parcelas Nuevas, Paseo Lajita, Reparto Quiñones, Residencial Golden Village, Residencial Villa de la Rosa, Sector El Cerro, Sector El Juicio, Sector El Patio, Sector La Españolita, Sector Las Abejas, Sector Loma del Viento, Sector Los Llanos, Sector Mondragón, Sector Paseo Los Pinos, Sector Saturnino, Sector Toronjo, Sector Usabón, Urbanización Colinas del Paraíso, Urbanización Colinas de San Francisco, and Urbanización Santa Ana.

== Gallery ==
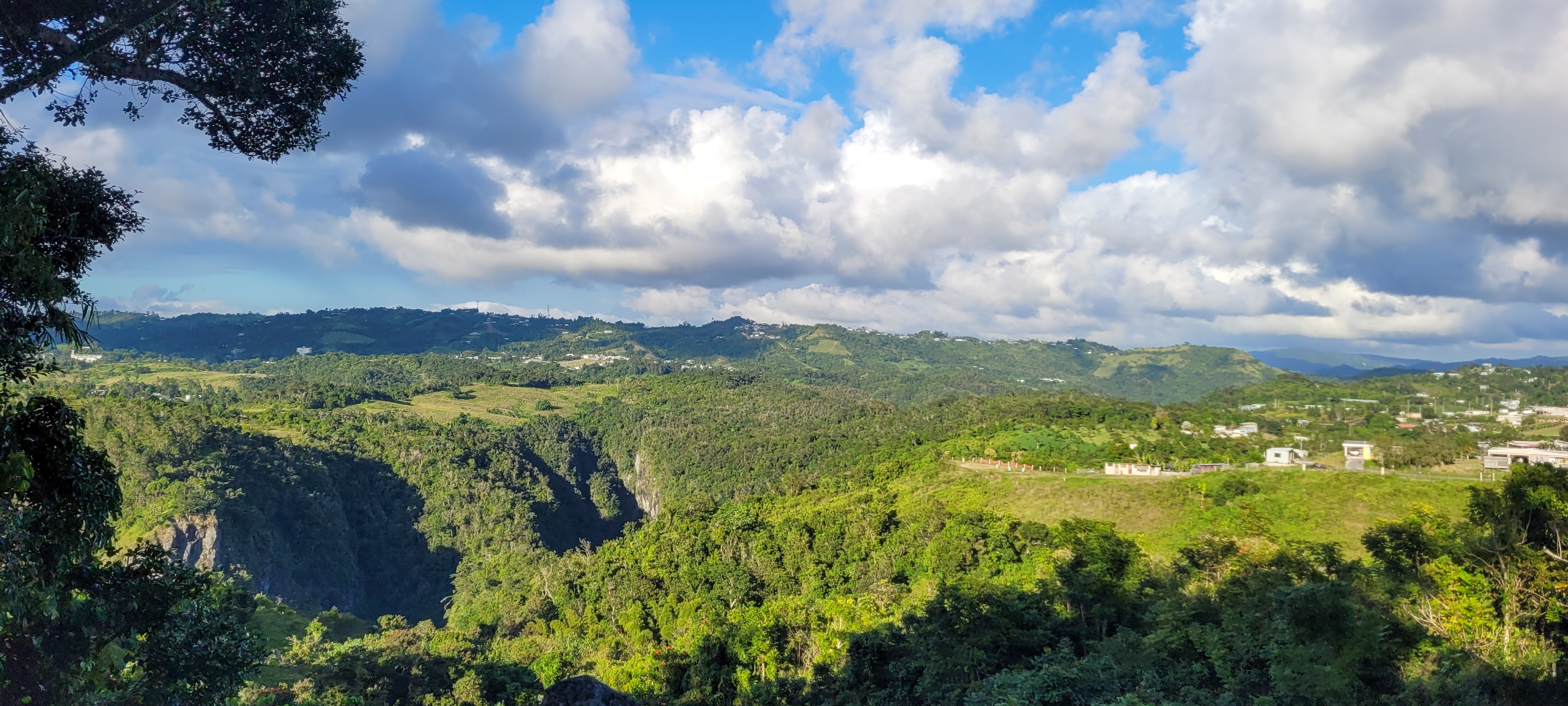
Cañón San Cristóbal between Aibonito and Barranquitas

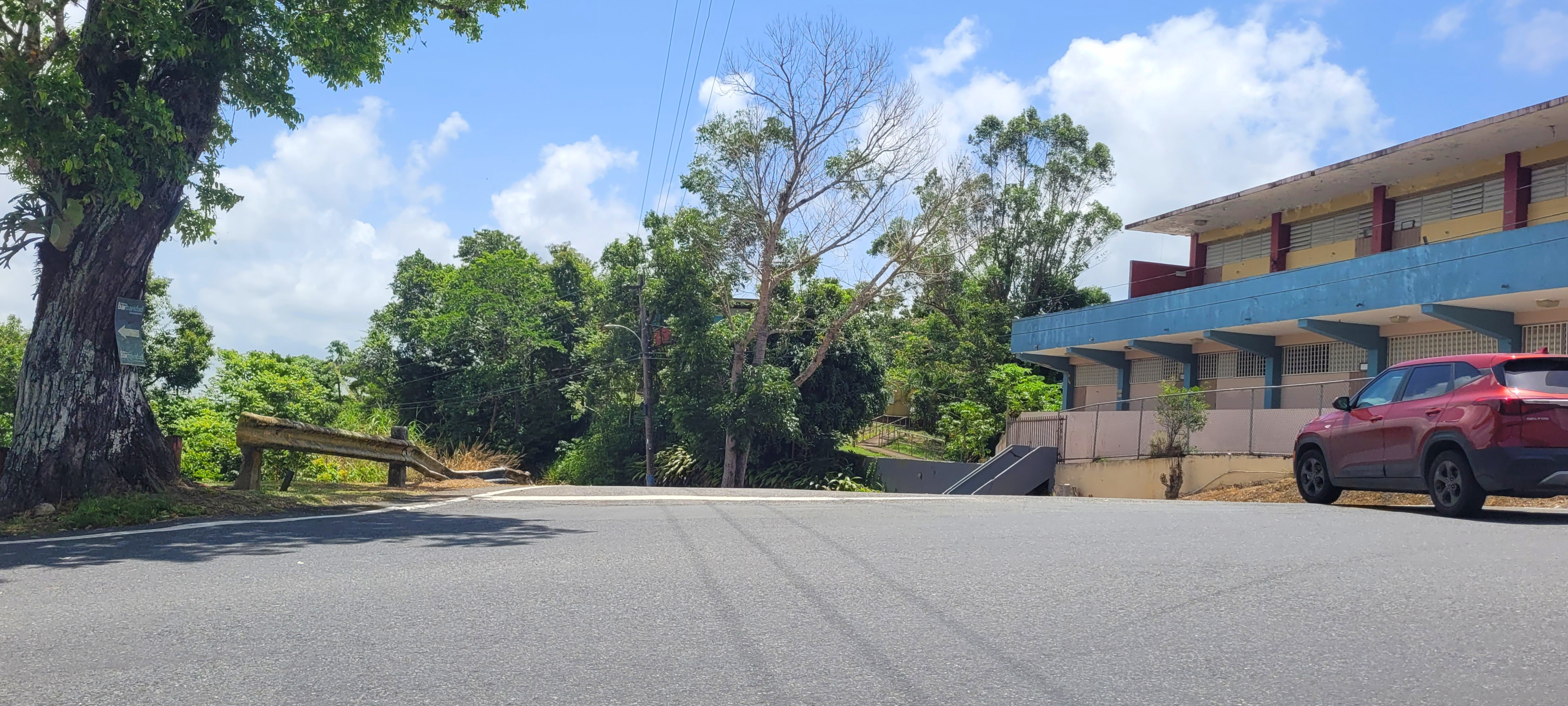
Puerto Rico Highway 725 in Llanos

== See also ==
- List of communities in Puerto Rico
- List of barrios and sectors of Aibonito, Puerto Rico
