= Aibonito Festival of Flowers =

Annual festival in Aibonito, Puerto Rico

The purple flower on the coat of arms and other official symbols of the municipality represent Aibonito's thriving floriculture and its flower festival.

The Aibonito Festival of Flowers (Spanish: Festival de las Flores de Aibonito) is a yearly festival that takes place in Aibonito, Puerto Rico. This is a 10-day festival that is celebrated every June at specially designated grounds just outside Aibonito Pueblo. Attendees to the festival are able to see and purchase flowers of all kinds brought by growers and retailers from all over Puerto Rico. In addition to the floral exhibits there are exhibitions dedicated to fruit and vegetable plants, live music performances, food kiosks, activities for children, and traditional arts and crafts.

== History ==
Aibonito is an important center in the floral industry of Puerto Rico since before the first edition of the festival. The festival has been celebrated for almost fifty years, and the first edition was celebrated in 1969. Its original purpose was and still is to showcase Puerto Rico's flora and island's floral industry. The festival was officially established for its second edition when the "Festival de las Flores de Aibonito, Inc" ("Aibonito Festival of Flowers, Inc.") was incorporated with the objective of promoting and celebrating the town's floriculture and agriculture. In 2017 Hurricane María brought significant amount of rain, wind and destruction which decimated the flower industry of Aibonito. In 2020 and 2021 the festival was cancelled due to the ongoing COVID-19 pandemic in Puerto Rico.

== See also ==
- Aibonito, Puerto Rico
- Floriculture
- Tourism in Puerto Rico
