= Usabón River =

River of Puerto Rico

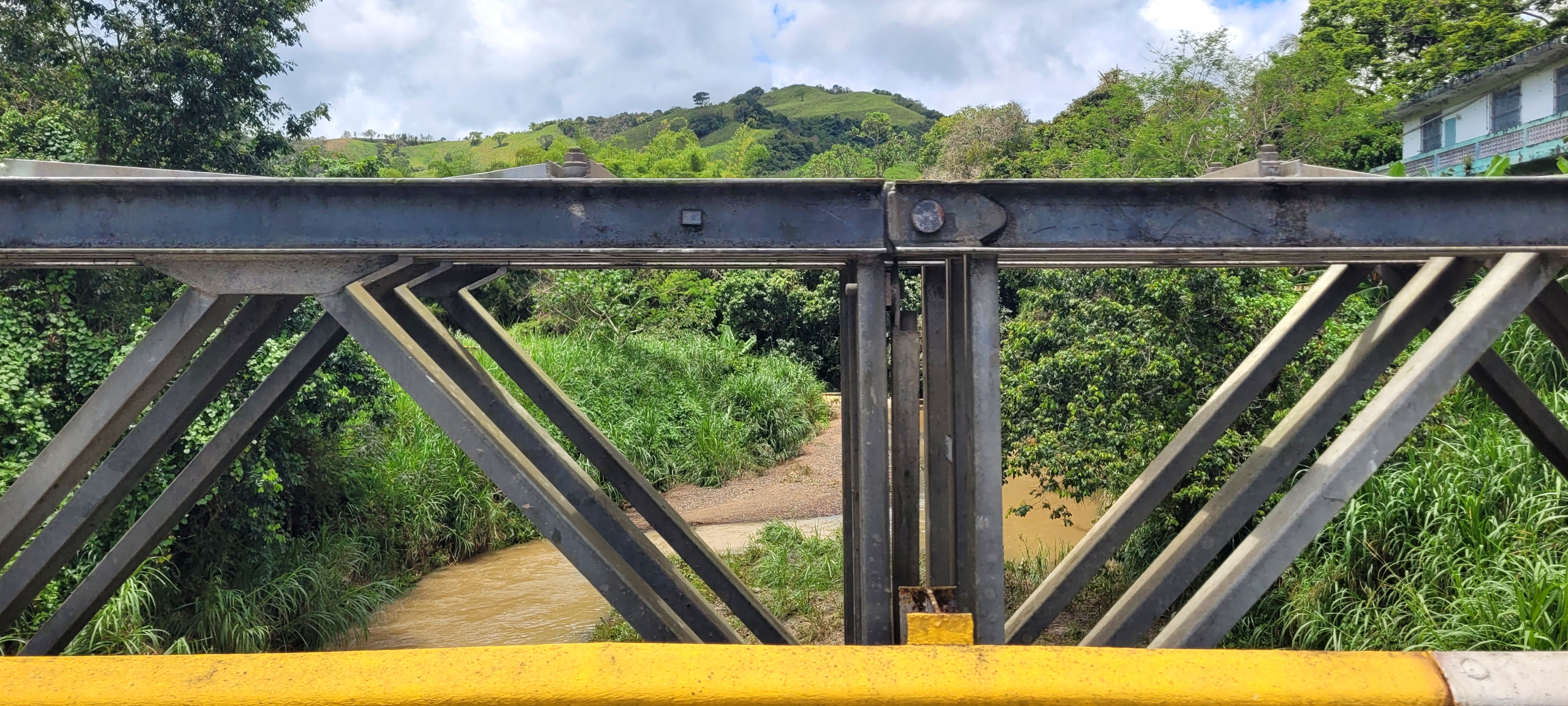
- Usabón River from Puerto Rico Highway 162 between Aibonito and Barranquitas
- Native name: Río Usabón (Spanish)

Location
- Commonwealth: Puerto Rico
- Municipality: Aibonito

Physical characteristics
- Source
  - coordinates: 18.1805134°N 66.2426680°W
  - elevation: 781 ft.

The Usabón River (Spanish: Río Usabón) is a river of Aibonito and Barranquitas, Puerto Rico.

== See also ==
- List of rivers of Puerto Rico
