= Caonillas, Aibonito, Puerto Rico =

Barrio of Puerto Rico

Caonillas
- Barrio
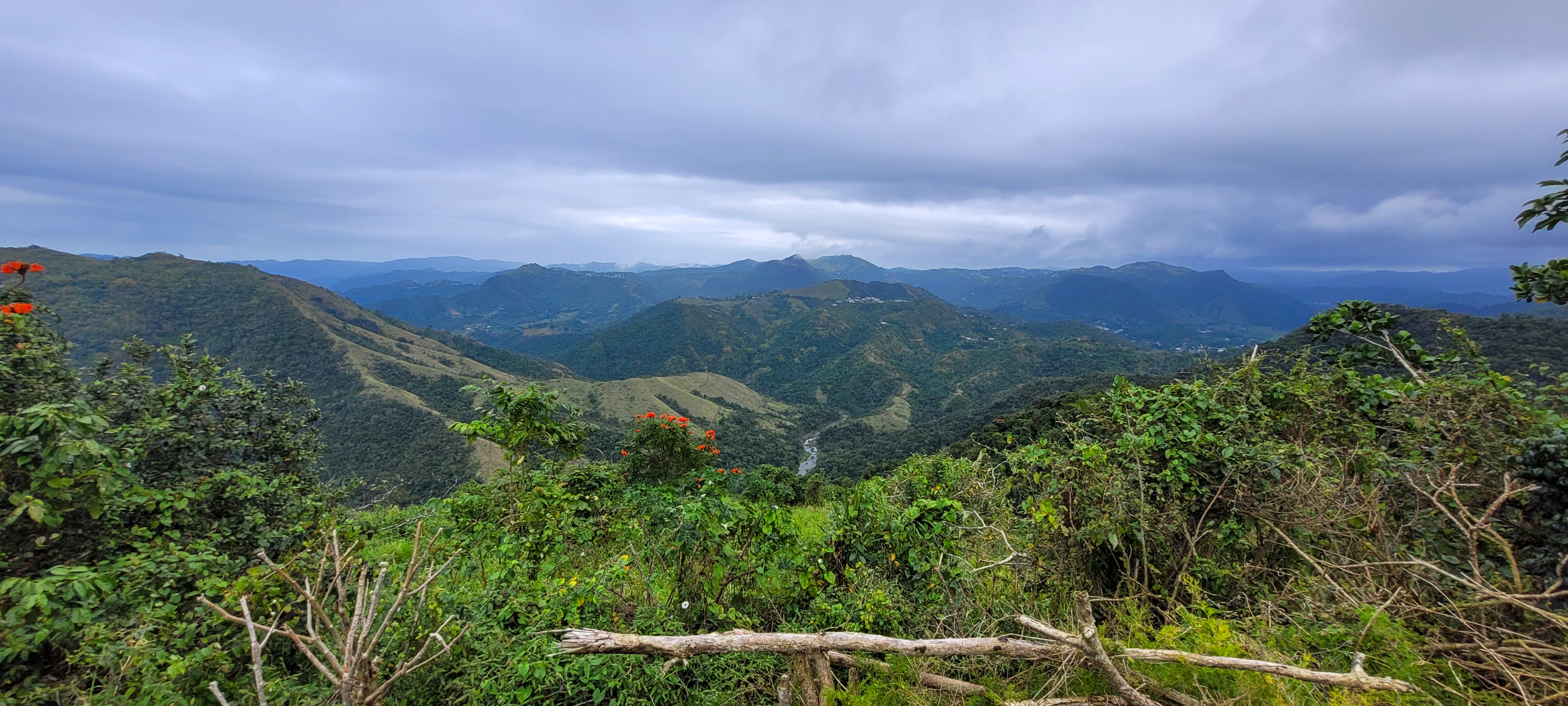
- View of the mountains from Caonillas

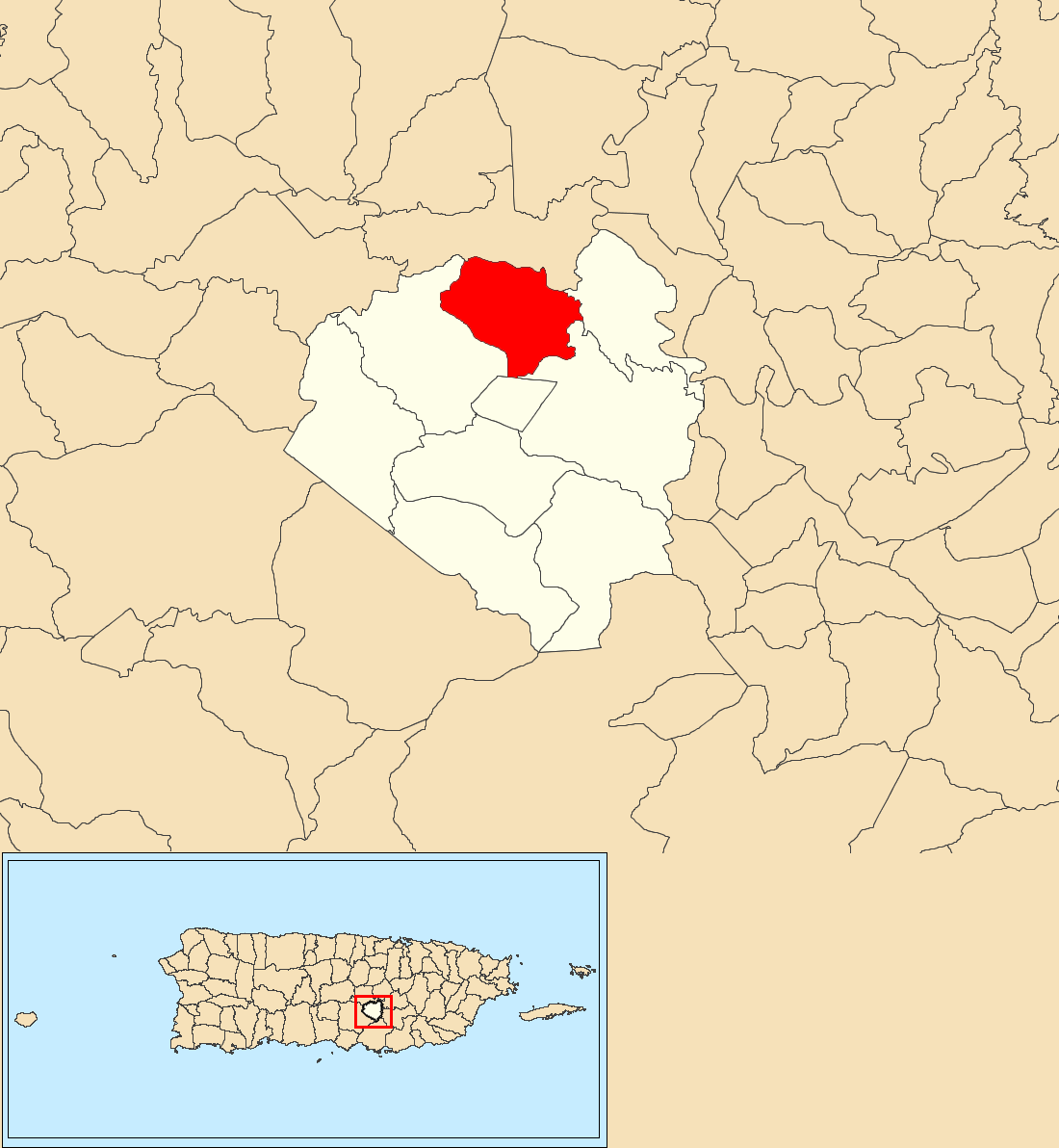
- Location of Caonillas within the municipality of Aibonito shown in red

- Location of Puerto Rico
- Coordinates: 18°09′36″N 66°15′50″W
- Commonwealth: Puerto Rico
- Municipality: Aibonito

Area
  - Total: 2.79 sq mi (7.2 km^{2})
  - Land: 2.79 sq mi (7.2 km^{2})
  - Water: 0.00 sq mi (0 km^{2})
- Elevation: 1,808 ft (551 m)

Population (2010)
  - Total: 1,424
  - Density: 510.4/sq mi (197.1/km^{2})
- Source: 2010 Census
- Time zone: UTC−4 (AST)

Caonillas is a barrio in the municipality of Aibonito, Puerto Rico. Its population in 2010 was 1,424.

== History ==
Caonillas was in Spain's gazetteers until Puerto Rico was ceded by Spain in the aftermath of the Spanish–American War under the terms of the Treaty of Paris of 1898 and became an unincorporated territory of the United States. In 1899, the United States Department of War conducted a census of Puerto Rico finding that the combined population of Caonillas and Asomante barrios was 1,245.

Historical population
Census	Pop.	Note	%±
1910	656		—
1920	892		36.0%
1930	895		0.3%
1940	1,081		20.8%
1950	756		−30.1%
1960	807		6.7%
1970	1,187		47.1%
1980	1,143		−3.7%
1990	1,411		23.4%
2000	1,402		−0.6%
2010	1,424		1.6%
U.S. Decennial Census; 1900 (N/A) 1910-1930; 1930-1950 1980-2000 2010

== Sectors ==
Barrios (which are, in contemporary times, roughly comparable to minor civil divisions) in turn are further subdivided into smaller local populated place areas/units called sectores (sectors in English). The types of sectores may vary, from normally sector to urbanización to reparto to barriada to residencial, among others.

The following sectors are in Caonillas barrio:

Desvío Robles, La Vega, Parcelas Nuevas, Parcelas Viejas, Sector Bambúa, Sector Bejucos, Sector Corea, Sector El Coquí, Sector Escuelas, Sector La Tea, Sector Quenepo, and Sector Verdún.

== Special communities ==
Since 2001 when law 1-2001 was passed, measures have been taken to identify and address the high levels of poverty and the lack of resources and opportunities affecting specific communities in Puerto Rico. Initially there were 686 places that made the list. By 2008, there were 742 places on the list of Comunidades especiales de Puerto Rico. The places on the list are barrios, communities, sectors, or neighborhoods and in 2004 Sector El Coquí in Caonillas made the list. In 2017, Jesus Velez Vargas, the director of the Special Communities of Puerto Rico program stated that the program was evolving with more ways to help the residents of these so-called marginal communities.

== See also ==
- List of communities in Puerto Rico
- List of barrios and sectors of Aibonito, Puerto Rico
