= Asomante, Aibonito, Puerto Rico =

Barrio of Puerto Rico

Asomante
- Barrio
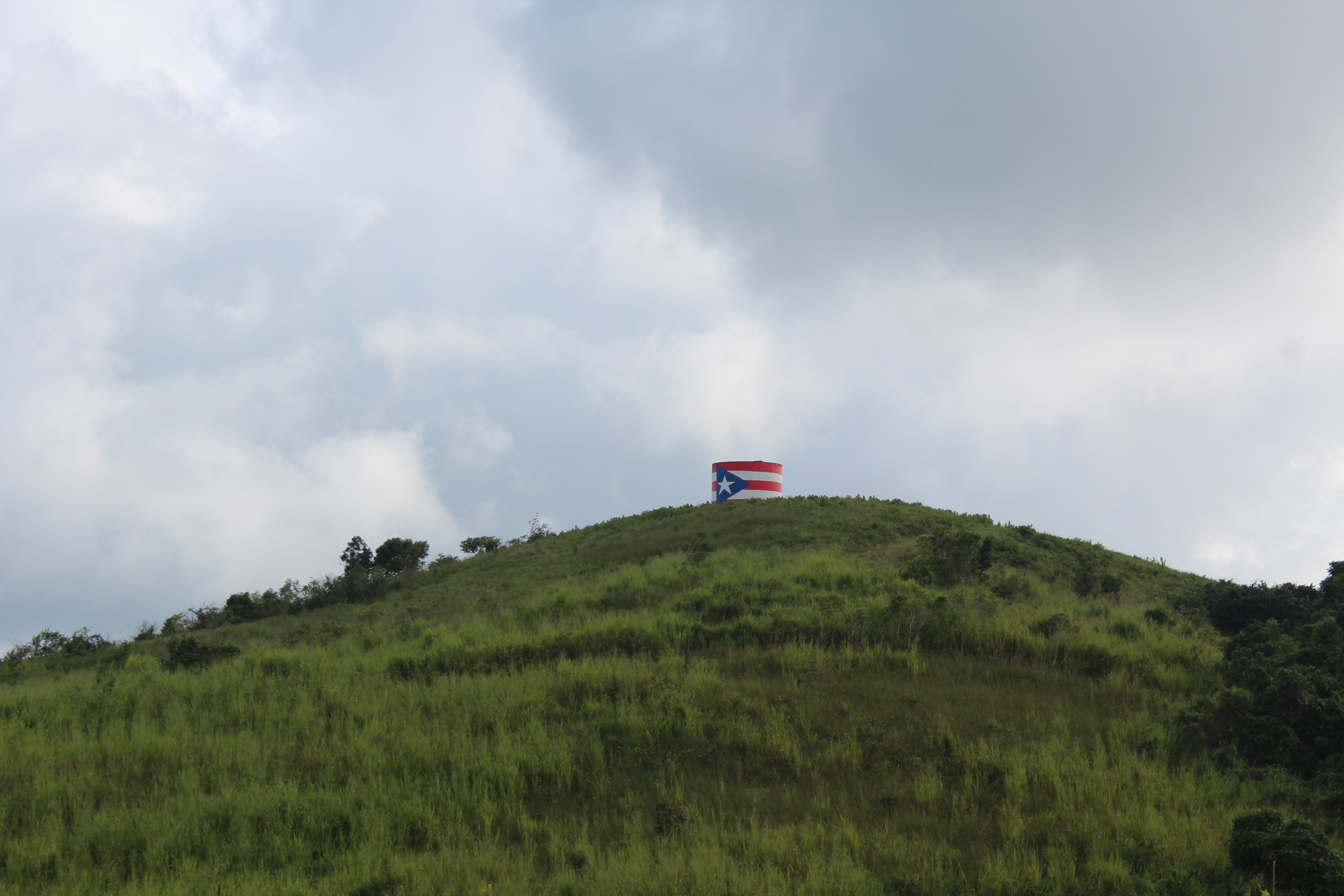
- View of a hill in Asomante

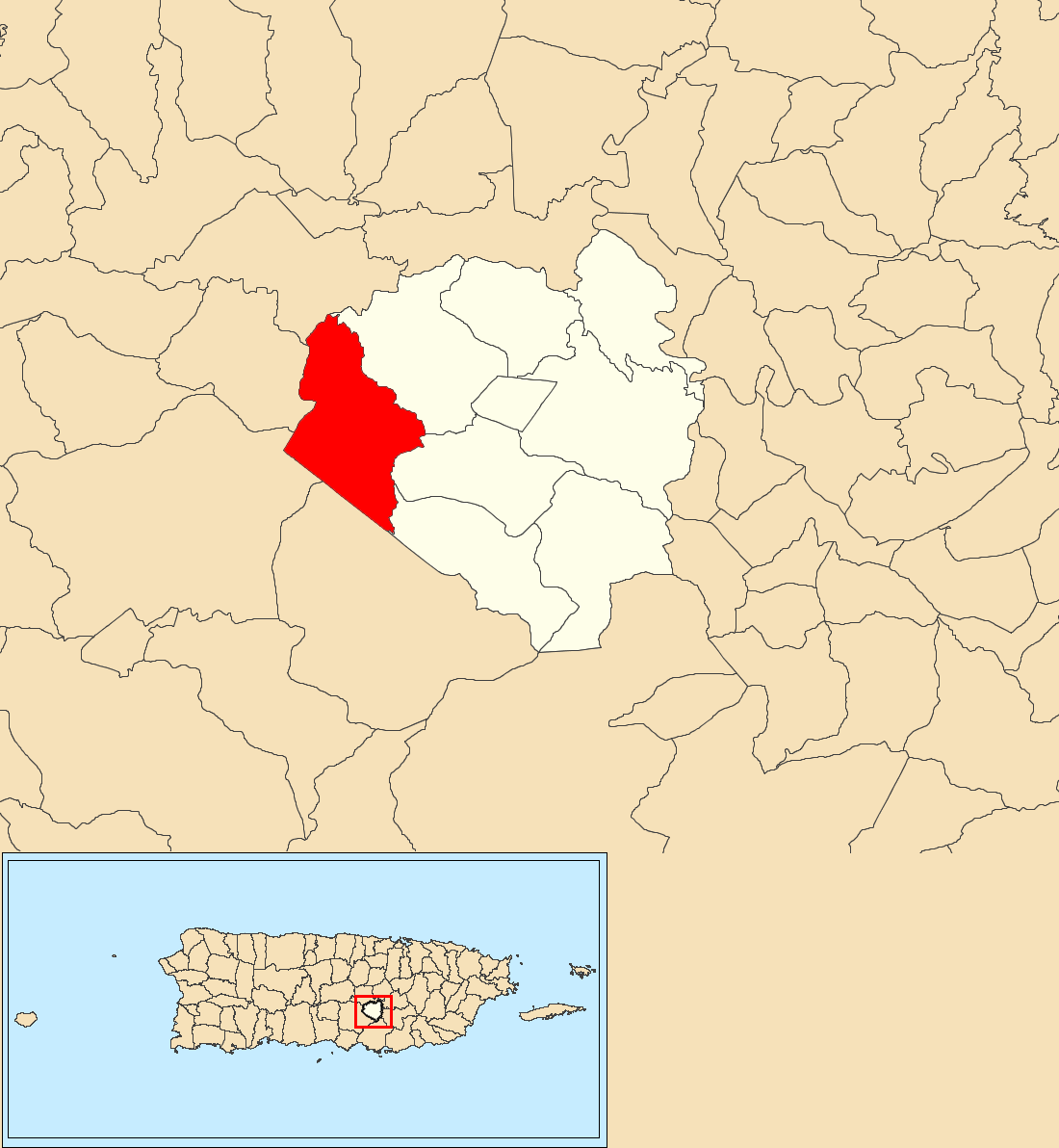
- Location of Asomante within the municipality of Aibonito shown in red

- Location of Puerto Rico
- Coordinates: 18°08′01″N 66°18′28″W
- Commonwealth: Puerto Rico
- Municipality: Aibonito

Area
  - Total: 4.26 sq mi (11.0 km^{2})
  - Land: 4.24 sq mi (11.0 km^{2})
  - Water: 0.02 sq mi (0.052 km^{2})
- Elevation: 1,991 ft (607 m)

Population (2010)
  - Total: 2,966
  - Density: 699.5/sq mi (270.1/km^{2})
- Source: 2010 Census
- Time zone: UTC−4 (AST)

Asomante is a barrio in the municipality of Aibonito, Puerto Rico. Its population in 2010 was 2,966.

== History ==
Asomante was in Spain's gazetteers until Puerto Rico was ceded by Spain in the aftermath of the Spanish–American War under the terms of the Treaty of Paris of 1898 and became an unincorporated territory of the United States. In 1899, the United States Department of War conducted a census of Puerto Rico finding that the combined population of Asomante and Caonillas barrios was 1,245.

Historical population
Census	Pop.	Note	%±
1910	1,065		—
1920	1,287		20.8%
1930	1,852		43.9%
1940	1,688		−8.9%
1950	1,639		−2.9%
1960	1,487		−9.3%
1970	1,712		15.1%
1980	1,839		7.4%
1990	2,388		29.9%
2000	2,787		16.7%
2010	2,966		6.4%
U.S. Decennial Census; 1900 (N/A) 1910-1930; 1930-1950 1980-2000 2010

== Sectors ==
Barrios (which are, in contemporary times, roughly comparable to minor civil divisions) in turn are further subdivided into smaller local populated place areas/units called sectores (sectors in English). The types of sectores may vary, from normally sector to urbanización to reparto to barriada to residencial, among others.

The following sectors are in Asomante barrio:

Alturas de Asomante, Comunidad Asomante, Estancias Asomante, Hogar Dulce Vida, Lomas de Aibonito, Parcelas Cuadritos, Parcelas Emanuelli, Sector Bejucos, Sector Cristian Belén, Sector El Cerro, Sector El Nueve, Sector Esparra, Sector Las Abejas, Sector Los Llanos, Sector Los Cuadritos, Sector Los Mangós, Sector Los Ranchetes, Sector Los Reyes, Sector Sabana, Sector Serrallés, Sector Subida Asomante, Urbanización Jatibonito, Urbanización Mansiones de Asomante, Urbanización Praderas de Aibonito, and Urbanización Praderas de Asomante.

== Gallery ==
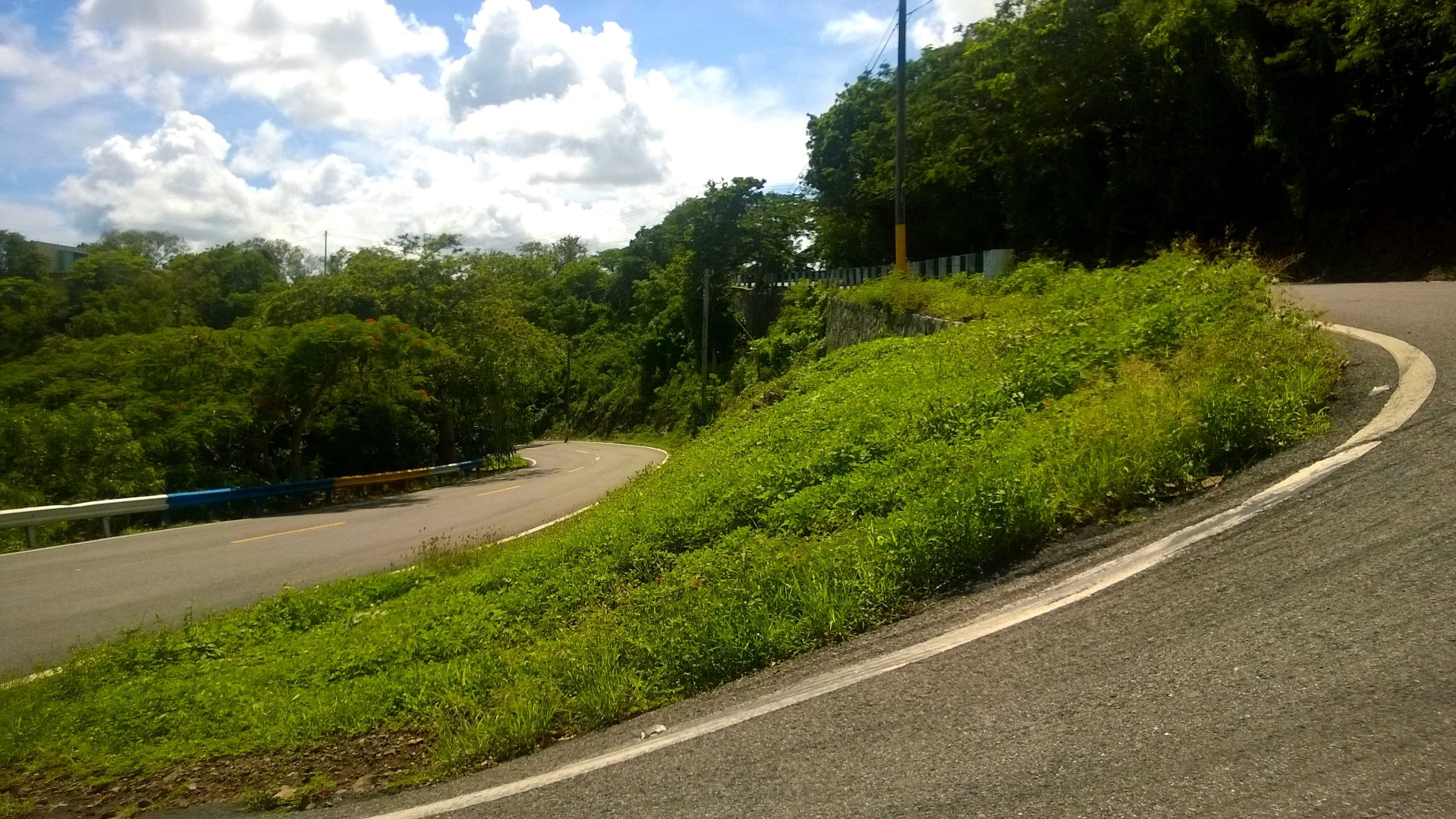
Puerto Rico Highway 14 between Asomante and Algarrobo

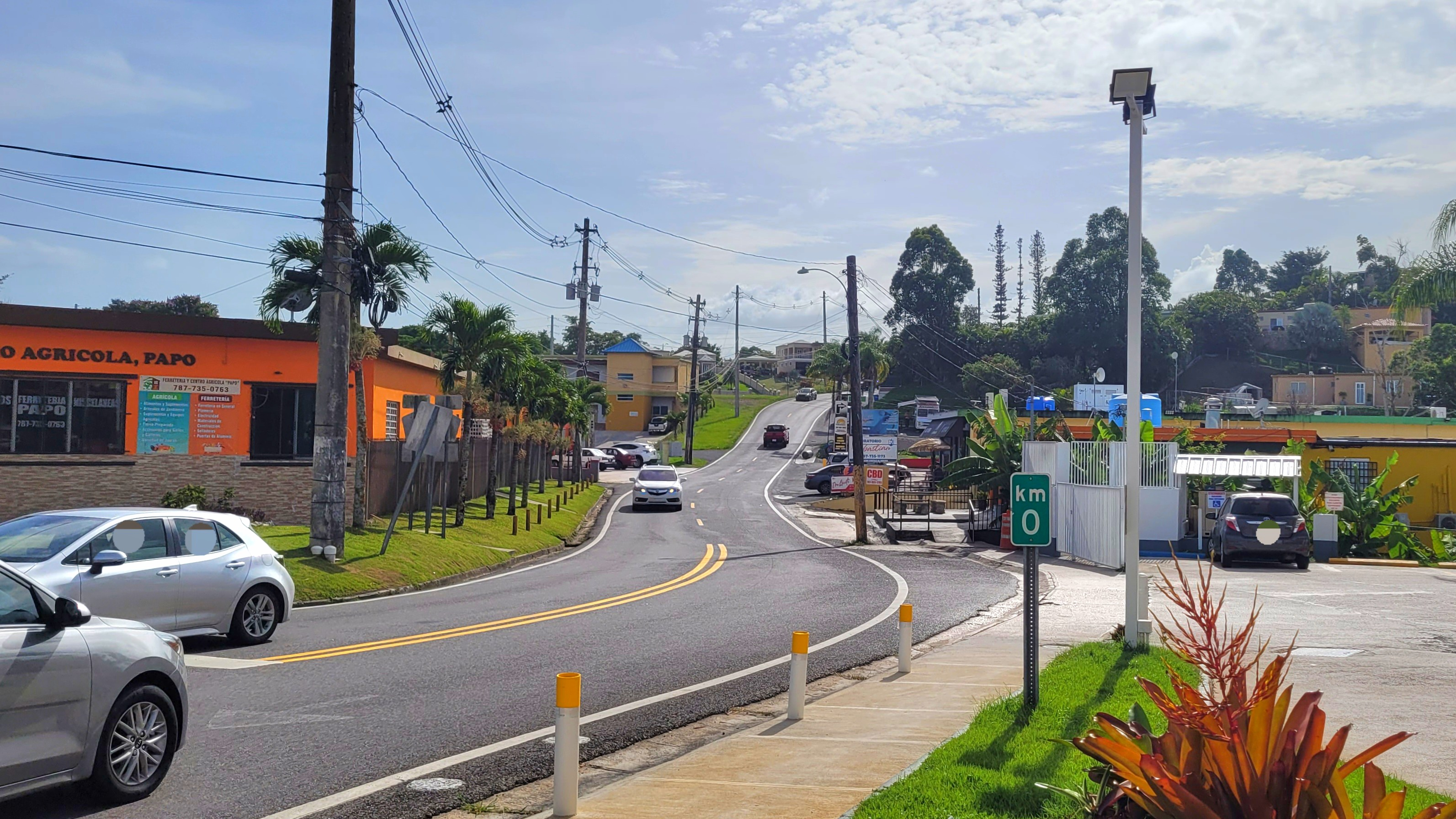
Puerto Rico Highway 723 in Asomante

== See also ==
- List of communities in Puerto Rico
- List of barrios and sectors of Aibonito, Puerto Rico
