= Río de Aibonito =

River of Puerto Rico

Coordinates: 18.1655140°N 66.2926688°W

Location
- Commonwealth: Puerto Rico
- Municipality: Aibonito

Physical characteristics
- Source
  - elevation: 1322 ft.

The Río de Aibonito is a river of Aibonito, Puerto Rico.

== See also ==
- List of rivers of Puerto Rico
