= William Alicea Pérez =

Puerto Rican politician

Mayor of Aibonito
- Incumbent
- Assumed office January 14, 2009
- Preceded by: José Alberto Díaz Robles

Personal details
- Born: February 23, 1972 (age 54)
- Party: New Progressive Party (PNP)
- Education: Interamerican University of Puerto Rico Barranquitas Campus (BBA)

William "Willie" Alicea Pérez (born February 23, 1972) is a Puerto Rican politician and the current mayor of Aibonito. Alicea is affiliated with the New Progressive Party (PNP) and has served as mayor since 2009.

== Education ==
Pérez has a BA in Business Administration with a concentration in Management from the Interamerican University of Puerto Rico Barranquitas Campus.

== Work ==
Several infrastructure projects were completed in 2014 during his tenure including the inauguration of the Centro Hidroterapeútico de la Montaña, a therapeutic center for elderly, the Estadio Hermanos Marrero, a baseball stadium and he announced future plans for a gym, another stadium and other projects to benefit the community of Aibonito.
