= Algarrobo, Aibonito, Puerto Rico =

Barrio of Puerto Rico

Algarrobo
- Barrio
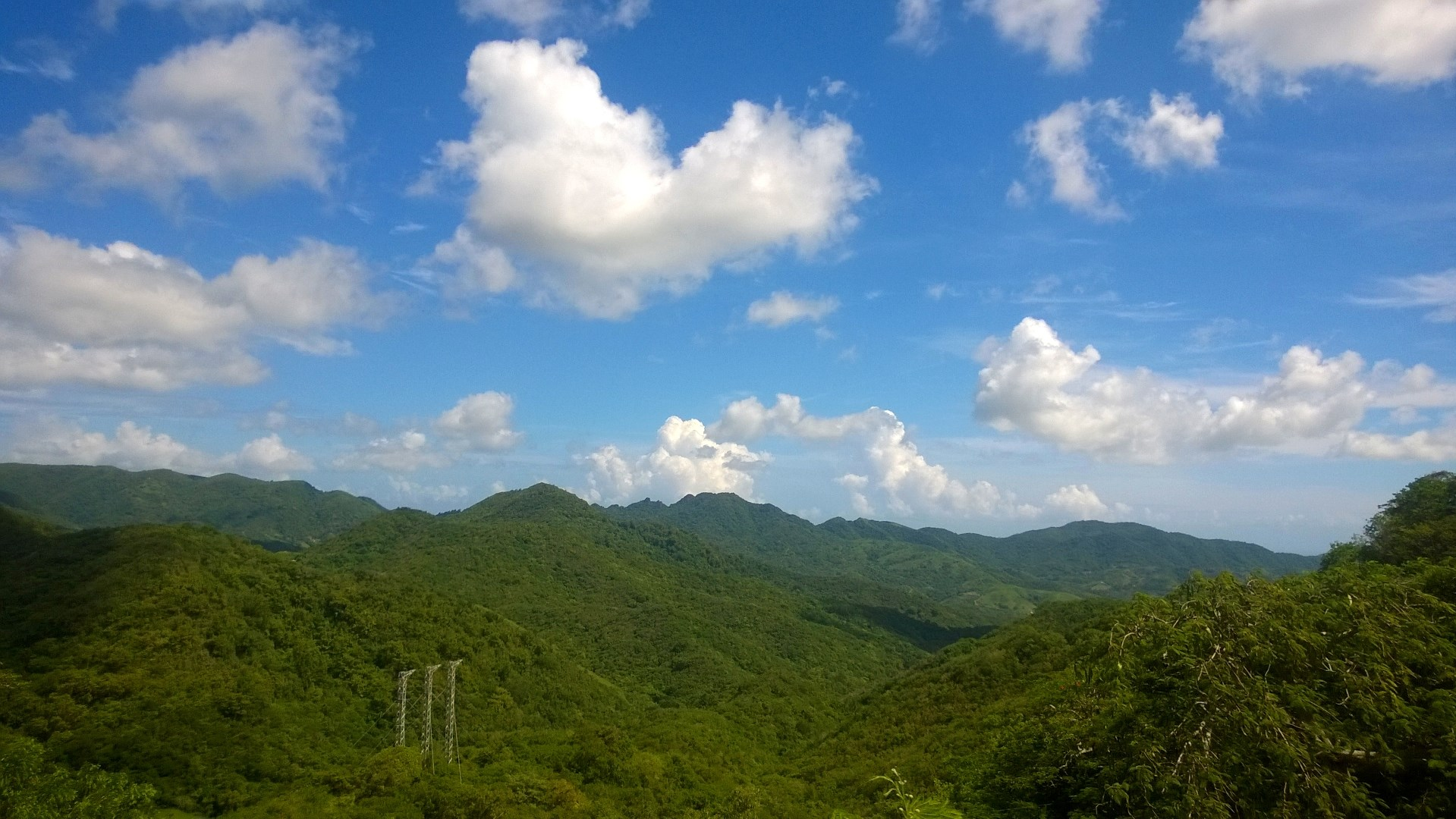
- Mountains in Algarrobo

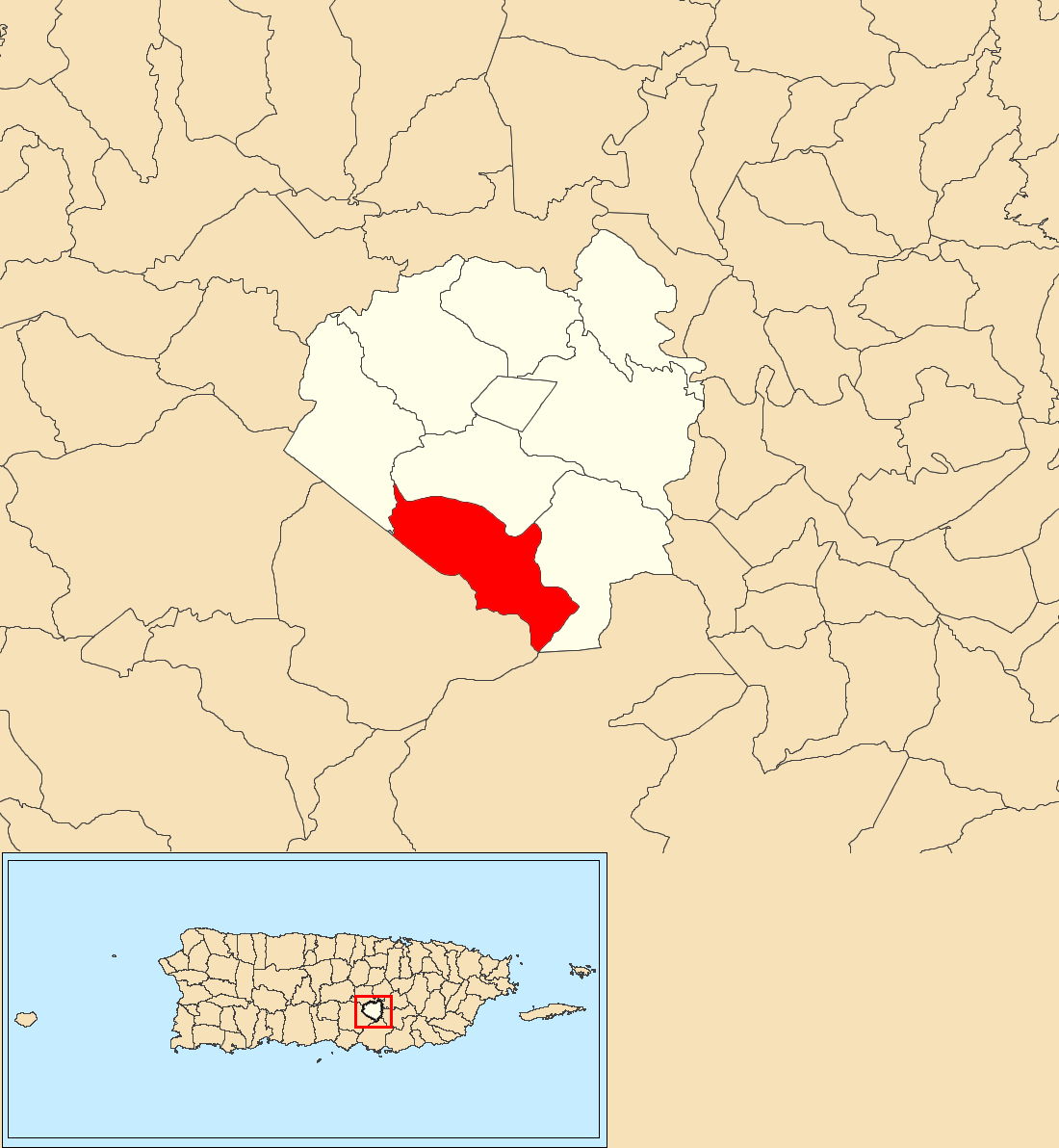
- Location of Algarrobo within the municipality of Aibonito shown in red

- Location of Puerto Rico
- Coordinates: 18°06′11″N 66°16′11″W
- Commonwealth: Puerto Rico
- Municipality: Aibonito

Area
  - Total: 3.56 sq mi (9.2 km^{2})
  - Land: 3.56 sq mi (9.2 km^{2})
  - Water: 0.00 sq mi (0 km^{2})
- Elevation: 1,506 ft (459 m)

Population (2010)
  - Total: 383
  - Density: 107.6/sq mi (41.5/km^{2})
- Source: 2010 Census
- Time zone: UTC−4 (AST)

Algarrobo is a barrio in the municipality of Aibonito, Puerto Rico. Its population in 2010 was 383.

== History ==
Algarrobo was in Spain's gazetteers until Puerto Rico was ceded by Spain in the aftermath of the Spanish–American War under the terms of the Treaty of Paris of 1898 and became an unincorporated territory of the United States. In 1899, the United States Department of War conducted a census of Puerto Rico finding that the population of Algarrobo and Llanos barrios was 1,226.

In 2004, Algarrobo in Aibonito was one of the 742 places on the list of marginalized communities (Comunidades Especiales de Puerto Rico); identified as such by the Puerto Rico Office for Socioeconomic and Community Development.

Historical population
Census	Pop.	Note	%±
1910	676		—
1920	875		29.4%
1930	1,010		15.4%
1940	1,068		5.7%
1950	869		−18.6%
1960	457		−47.4%
1970	374		−18.2%
1980	296		−20.9%
1990	519		75.3%
2000	431		−17.0%
2010	383		−11.1%
U.S. Decennial Census; 1899 (shown as 1900) 1910-1930; 1930-1950 1980-2000 2010

== Sectors ==
Barrios (which are, in contemporary times, roughly comparable to minor civil divisions) in turn are further subdivided into smaller local populated place areas/units called sectores (sectors in English). The types of sectores may vary, from normally sector to urbanización to reparto to barriada to residencial, among others.

The following sectors are in Algarrobo barrio:

Carretera 717, Sector Húcares, and Sector Subida.

== See also ==
- List of communities in Puerto Rico
- List of barrios and sectors of Aibonito, Puerto Rico
