= Cuyón, Aibonito, Puerto Rico =

Barrio of Puerto Rico

Cuyón
- Barrio
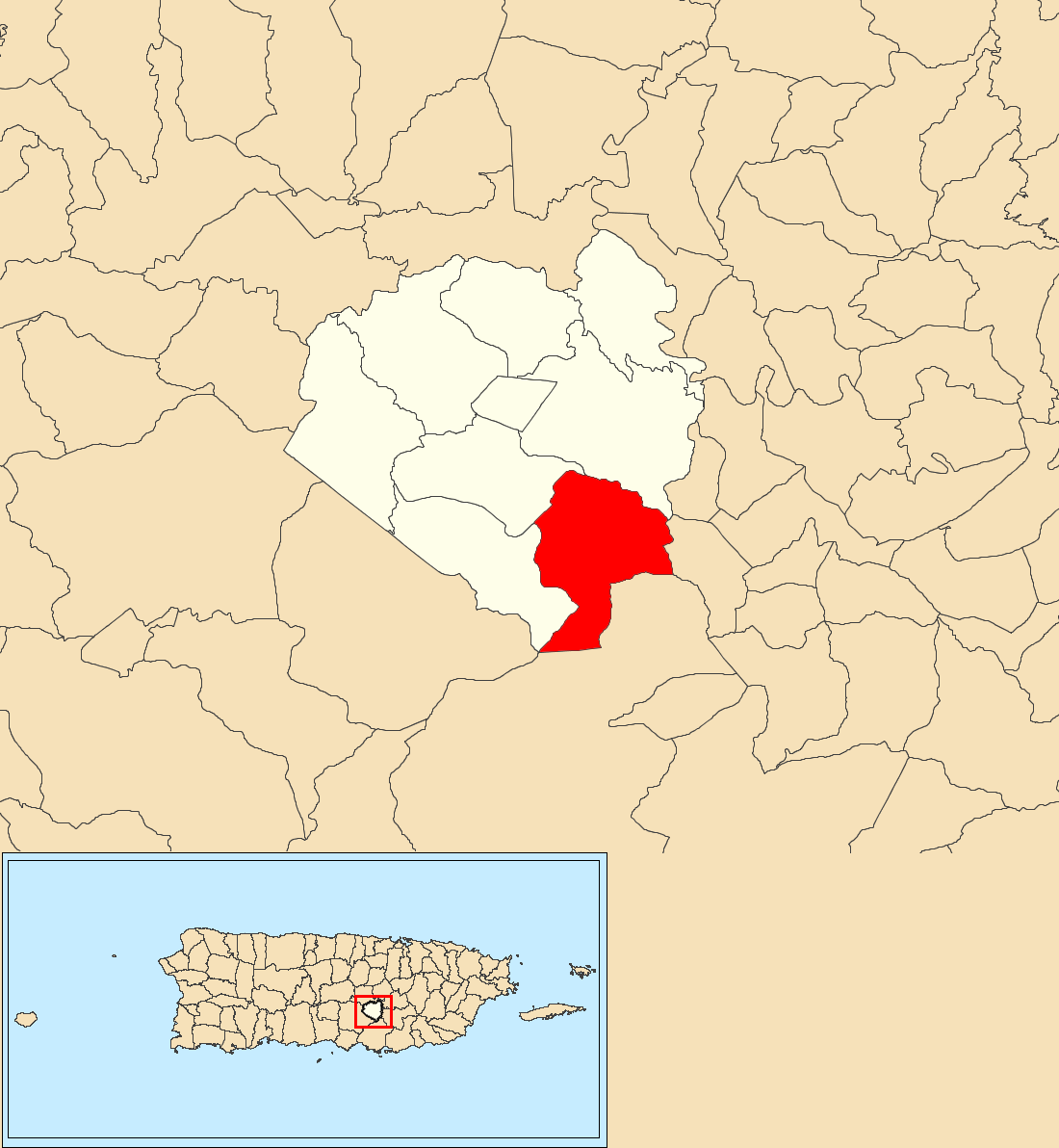
- Location of Cuyón within the municipality of Aibonito shown in red

- Location of Puerto Rico
- Coordinates: 18°05′48″N 66°14′27″W
- Commonwealth: Puerto Rico
- Municipality: Aibonito

Area
  - Total: 4.10 sq mi (10.6 km^{2})
  - Land: 4.10 sq mi (10.6 km^{2})
  - Water: 0.00 sq mi (0 km^{2})
- Elevation: 1,860 ft (570 m)

Population (2010)
  - Total: 977
  - Density: 238.3/sq mi (92.0/km^{2})
- Source: 2010 Census
- Time zone: UTC−4 (AST)

Cuyón is a barrio in the municipality of Aibonito, Puerto Rico. Its population in 2010 was 977.

The Cuyón River runs through this barrio and through Coamo.

== History ==
Cuyón was in Spain's gazetteers until Puerto Rico was ceded by Spain in the aftermath of the Spanish–American War under the terms of the Treaty of Paris of 1898 and became an unincorporated territory of the United States. In 1899, the United States Department of War conducted a census of Puerto Rico finding that the population of Cuyón barrio was 1,027.

Historical population
Census	Pop.	Note	%±
1900	1,027		—
1910	1,083		5.5%
1920	1,591		46.9%
1930	1,650		3.7%
1940	1,465		−11.2%
1950	1,569		7.1%
1960	996		−36.5%
1970	945		−5.1%
1980	752		−20.4%
1990	681		−9.4%
2000	873		28.2%
2010	977		11.9%
U.S. Decennial Census; 1899 (shown as 1900) 1910-1930; 1930-1950 1980-2000 2010

== Sectors ==
Barrios (which are, in contemporary times, roughly comparable to minor civil divisions) in turn are further subdivided into smaller local populated place areas/units called sectores (sectors in English). The types of sectores may vary, from normally sector to urbanización to reparto to barriada to residencial, among others.

The following sectors are in Cuyón barrio:

Carretera 162, Carretera 716, Cuyón I y II, Sector Boquerón, Sector El Fresar, Sector Gallardo Abajo, Sector Jagüeyes, Sector Ratones, Sector Rincón, and Sector Vertero.

== See also ==
- List of communities in Puerto Rico
- List of barrios and sectors of Aibonito, Puerto Rico
