= Puerto Rico Highway 722 =

Highway in Puerto Rico

Highway 722
- Ruta 722

Route information
- Maintained by Puerto Rico DTPW
- Length: 7.7 km (4.8 mi)
- Existed: 1953–present

Major junctions
- CCW end: PR-162 / PR-7718 in Pasto–Robles
- PR-7722 in Robles
- CW end: PR-14 in Aibonito barrio-pueblo

Location
- Country: United States
- Territory: Puerto Rico
- Municipalities: Aibonito

Highway system
- Roads in Puerto Rico; List
← PR-715	→ PR-723
← PR-7718	PR-7722	→ PR-7737

Puerto Rico Highway 722 (PR-722) is a rural road located in Aibonito, Puerto Rico. It begins at its intersection with PR-14 east of downtown Aibonito and ends at the Ruta Panorámica between Robles and Pasto barrios. The traditional Festival de las Flores is celebrated near this road.

Puerto Rico Highway 722

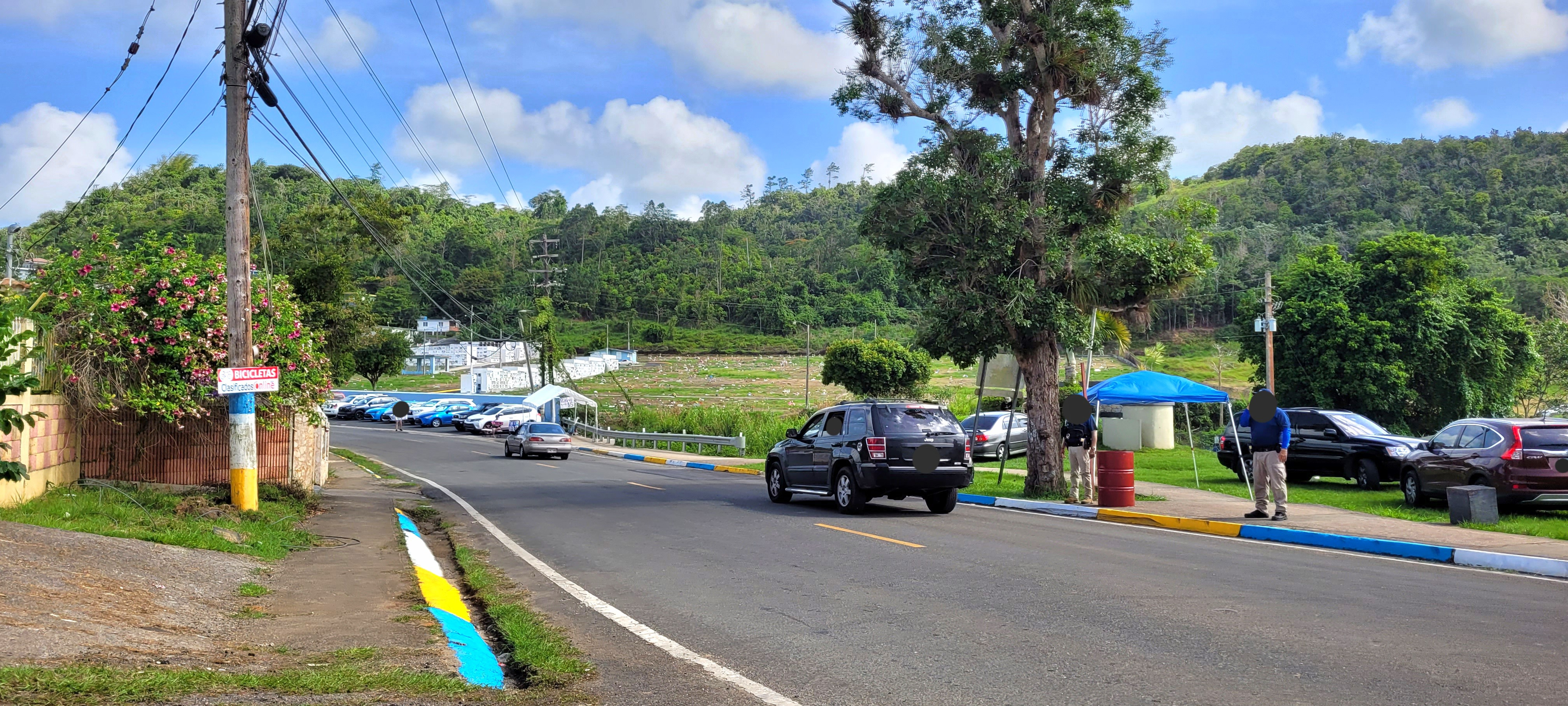
Heading south in Robles barrio

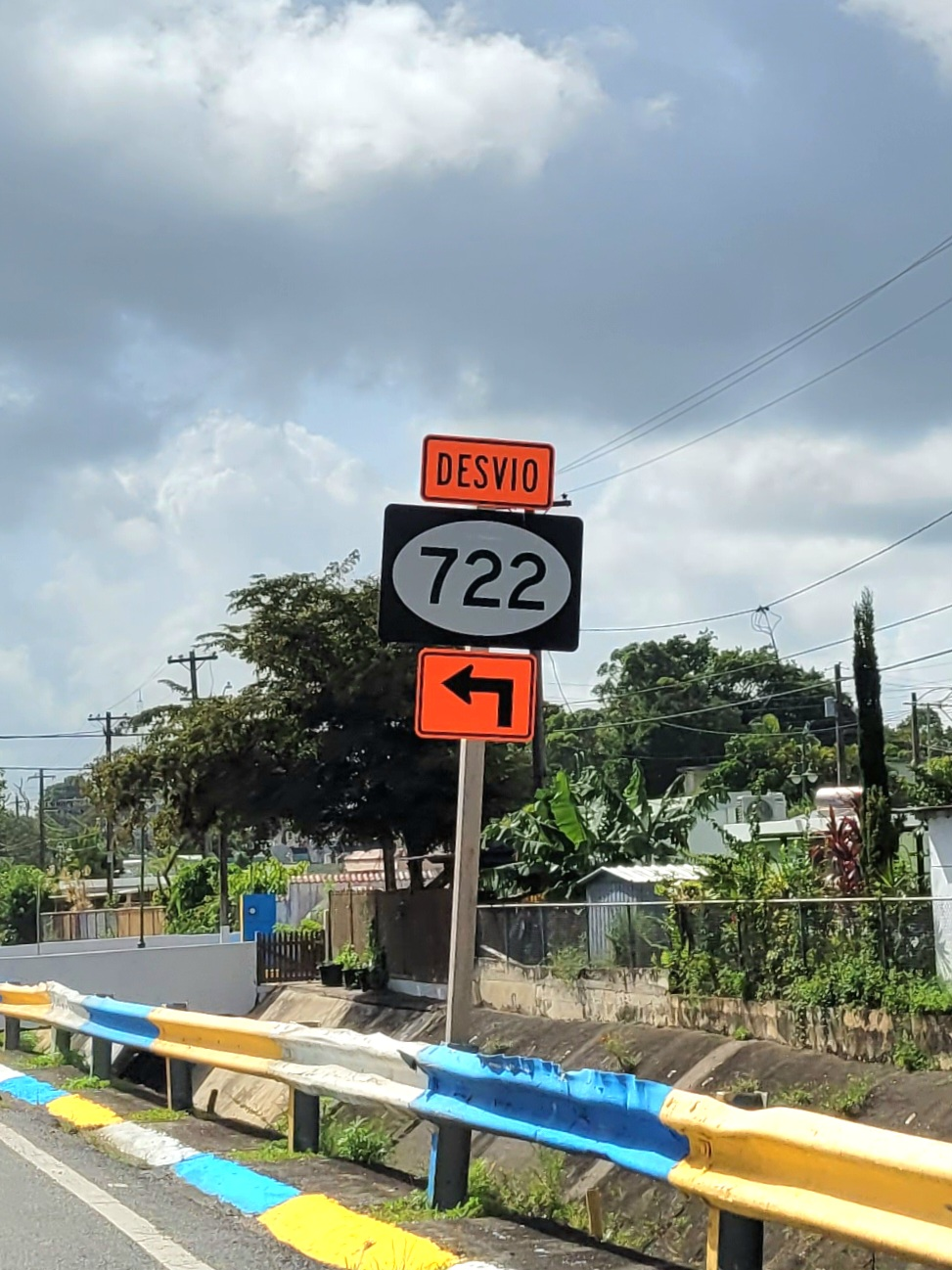
Detour sign in Aibonito barrio-pueblo

== Major intersections ==
The entire route is located in Aibonito.

Location	km	mi	Destinations	Notes
Pasto–Robles line	0.0	0.0	PR-7718 west (Paseo Don Julio Francisco "Paco" Santos Vázquez) – Coamo	Continuation beyond PR-162
Pasto–Robles line	0.0	0.0	PR-162 – Aibonito, Salinas	Counterclockwise terminus of PR-722 and western terminus of PR-7718; western terminus of the Ruta Panorámica concurrency; the Ruta Panorámica continues toward Barranquitas
Robles	2.7	1.7	PR-7722 east (Ruta Panorámica) – Cayey, Salinas	Eastern terminus of the Ruta Panorámica concurrency; the Ruta Panorámica continues toward Cayey
Aibonito barrio-pueblo	7.7	4.8	PR-14 (Avenida San José) – Aibonito, Cayey	Clockwise terminus of PR-722
1.000 mi = 1.609 km; 1.000 km = 0.621 mi: Concurrency terminus

== Related route ==
Highway 7722
- Location: Cayey – Aibonito
- Length: 6.3 km (3.9 mi)

Puerto Rico Highway 7722 (PR-7722) is a segment of the Ruta Panorámica that travels from Cayey to Aibonito. It begins at PR-1 between Pasto Viejo and Pedro Ávila barrios and ends at PR-722 in Robles.

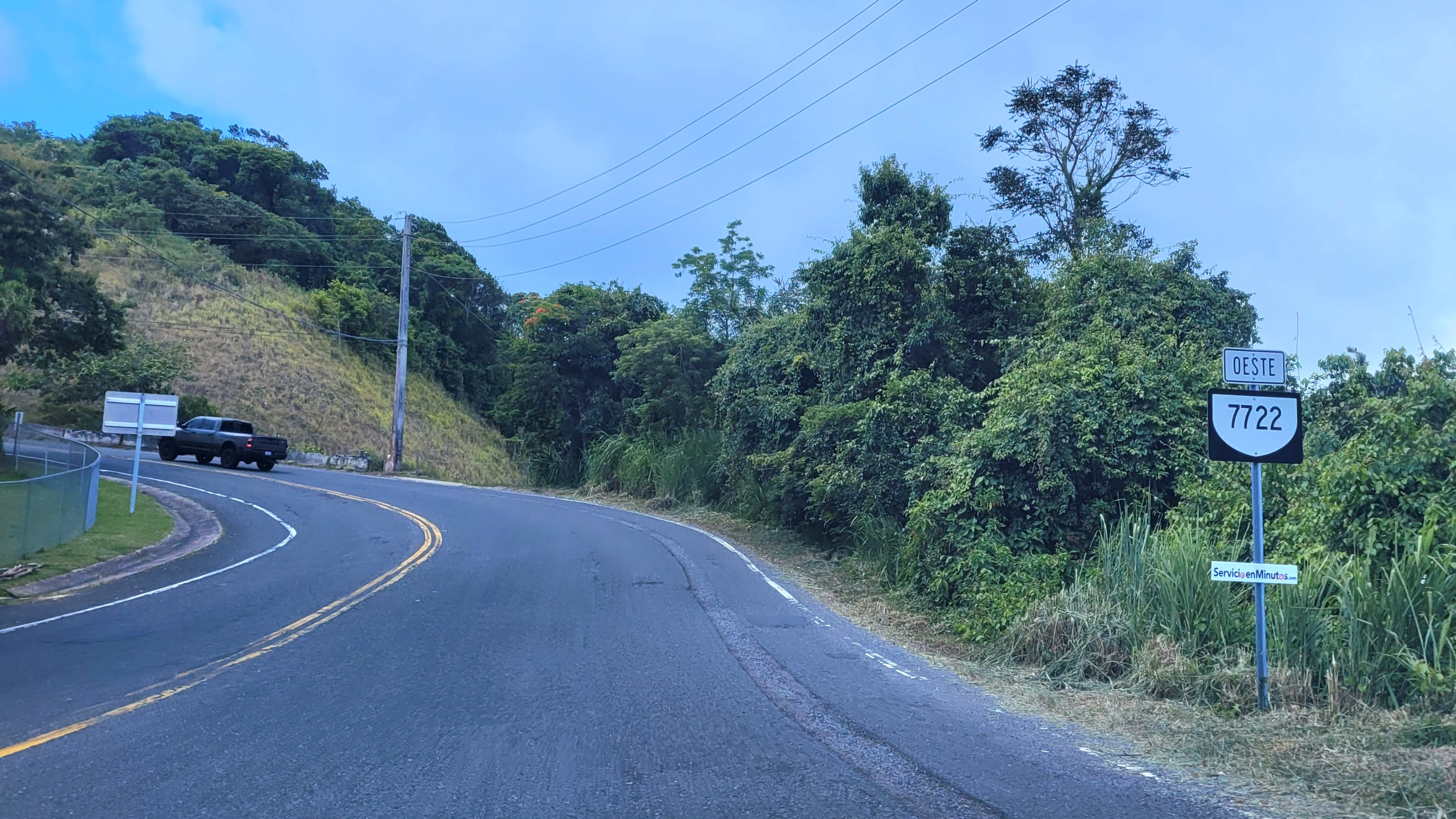
PR-7722 west in Cayey

Municipality	Location	km	mi	Destinations	Notes
Aibonito	Robles	6.3	3.9	PR-722 – Aibonito	Western terminus of PR-7722; the Ruta Panorámica continues toward Barranquitas
Cayey	Pasto Viejo–Pedro Ávila line	0.0	0.0	PR-1 – Cayey, Salinas	Eastern terminus of PR-7722; the Ruta Panorámica continues toward Cayey
1.000 mi = 1.609 km; 1.000 km = 0.621 mi

== See also ==
- 1953 Puerto Rico highway renumbering
