= Robles, Aibonito, Puerto Rico =

Barrio of Puerto Rico

Robles
- Barrio
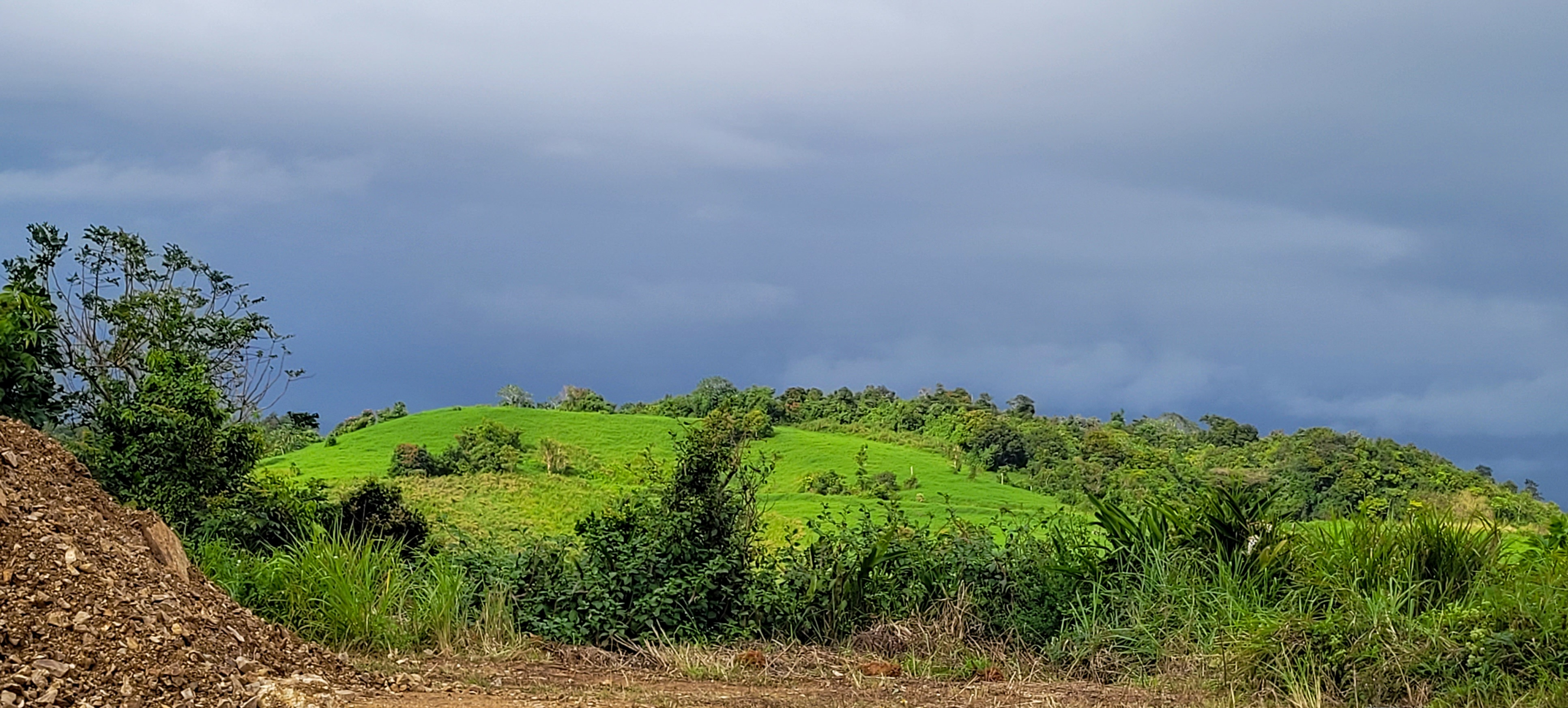
- Mountain view in Robles

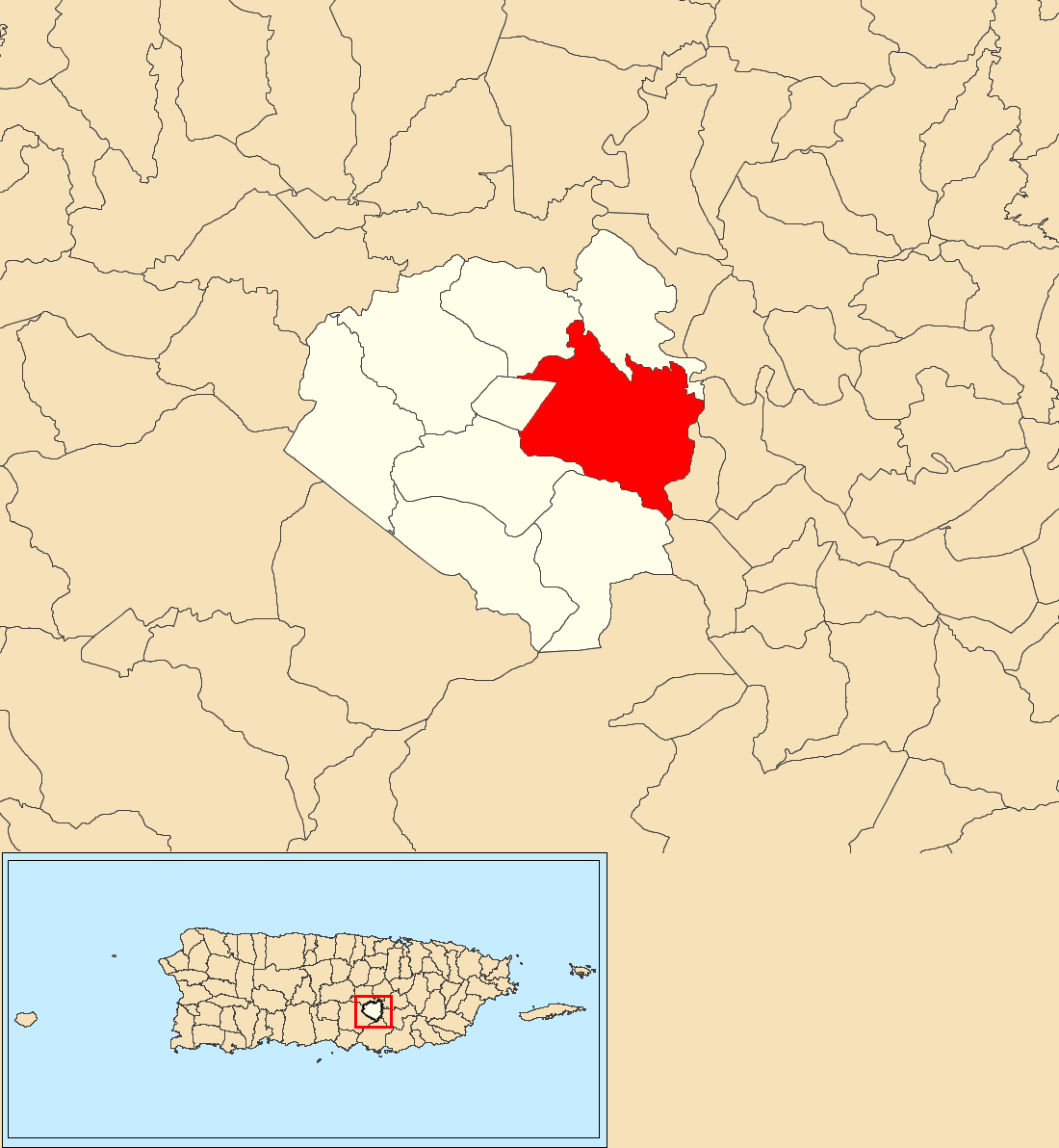
- Location of Robles within the municipality of Aibonito shown in red

- Location of Puerto Rico
- Coordinates: 18°08′00″N 66°14′20″W
- Commonwealth: Puerto Rico
- Municipality: Aibonito

Area
  - Total: 5.31 sq mi (13.8 km^{2})
  - Land: 5.31 sq mi (13.8 km^{2})
  - Water: 0.00 sq mi (0 km^{2})
- Elevation: 2,051 ft (625 m)

Population (2010)
  - Total: 3,863
  - Density: 727.5/sq mi (280.9/km^{2})
- Source: 2010 Census
- Time zone: UTC−4 (AST)

Robles is a barrio in the municipality of Aibonito, Puerto Rico. Its population in 2010 was 3863.

== History ==
Robles was in Spain's gazetteers until Puerto Rico was ceded by Spain in the aftermath of the Spanish–American War under the terms of the Treaty of Paris of 1898 and became an unincorporated territory of the United States. In 1899, the United States Department of War conducted a census of Puerto Rico finding that the combined population of Robles and Pasto barrios was 1,459.

Historical population
Census	Pop.	Note	%±
1910	1,171		—
1920	1,357		15.9%
1930	1,763		29.9%
1940	1,621		−8.1%
1950	1,801		11.1%
1960	1,925		6.9%
1970	2,049		6.4%
1980	3,101		51.3%
1990	4,916		58.5%
2000	4,566		−7.1%
2010	3,863		−15.4%
U.S. Decennial Census; 1900 (N/A) 1910-1930; 1930-1950 1980-2000 2010

== Sectors ==
Barrios (which are, in contemporary times, roughly comparable to minor civil divisions) in turn are further subdivided into smaller locally populated place areas/units called sectores (sectors in English). The types of sectores may vary, from normally sector to urbanización to reparto to barriada to residencial, among others.

The following sectors are in Robles barrio:

Barrio Robles Centro, Calle Mercedita Serrallés, Carretera 722, Condominio Casa Aibonito, Desvío Robles, Extensión Bella Vista, Extensión San José, Hogar Aurora, Parcelas Rabanal, Poblado Muñoz Rivera, Reparto Robles, Residencial Liborio Ortiz, Residencial Villa Verde, Ruta Panorámica 7722, Sector Campito, Sector Concretera, Sector El Castillo, Sector La Base, Sector La Ceiba, Sector La Loma, Sector Mameyes, Sector Manresa, Sector Pangola, Sector Rabanal, Sector Represa, Sector Sierra, Tramo Calle San José (Carretera 14) Norte, Tramo Calle San José (Carretera 14) Sur, Urbanización Bella Vista, Urbanización Brisas de Aibonito, Urbanización Buena Vista, Urbanización Campo Rey, Urbanización La Providencia (Pangola), Urbanización Las Flores, Urbanización Las Mercedes, Urbanización Las Quintas, Urbanización Monte Carlo, Urbanización San José, Urbanización Villa Coquí, Urbanización Villa Rosales, and Villa Panorámica.

== Gallery ==
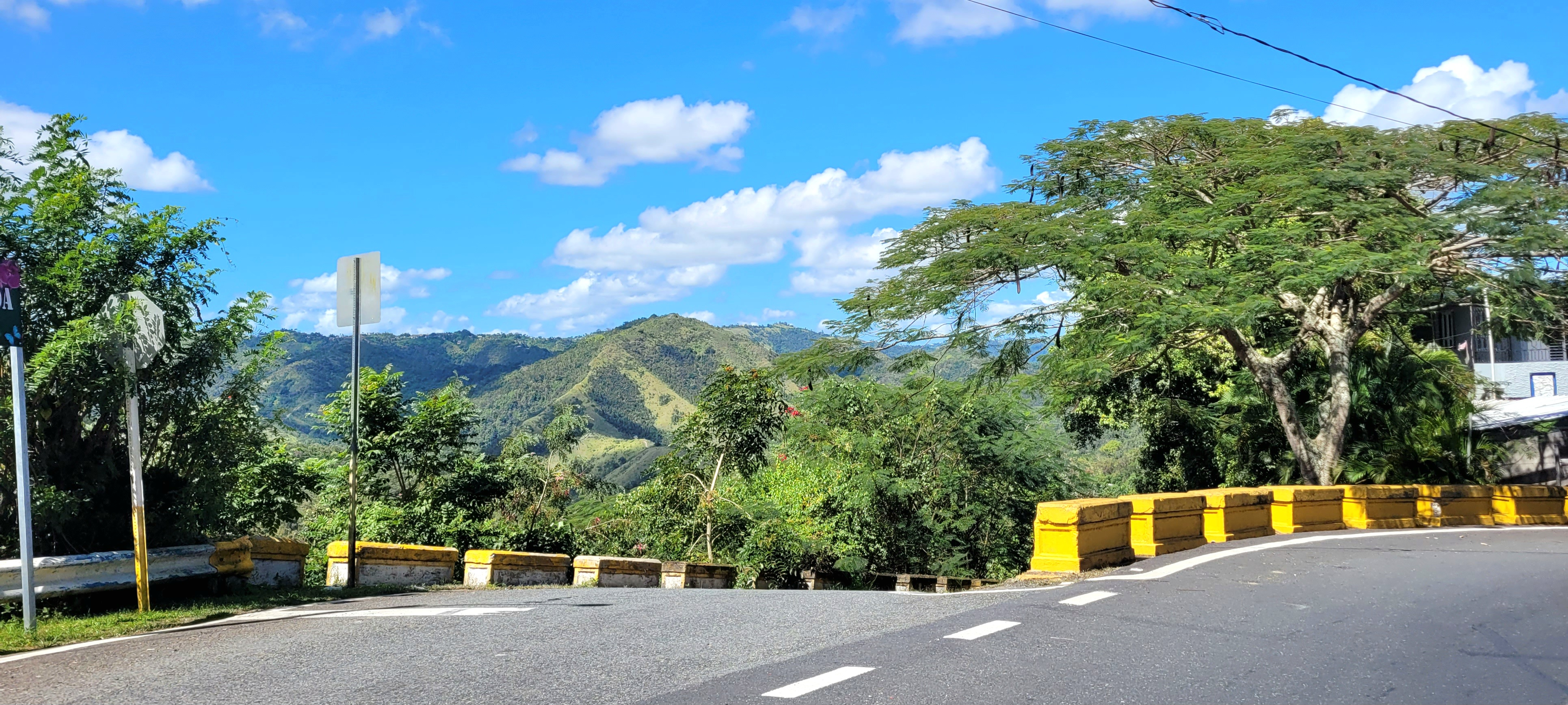
Puerto Rico Highway 727 at Puerto Rico Highway 14 junction between Robles and Plata

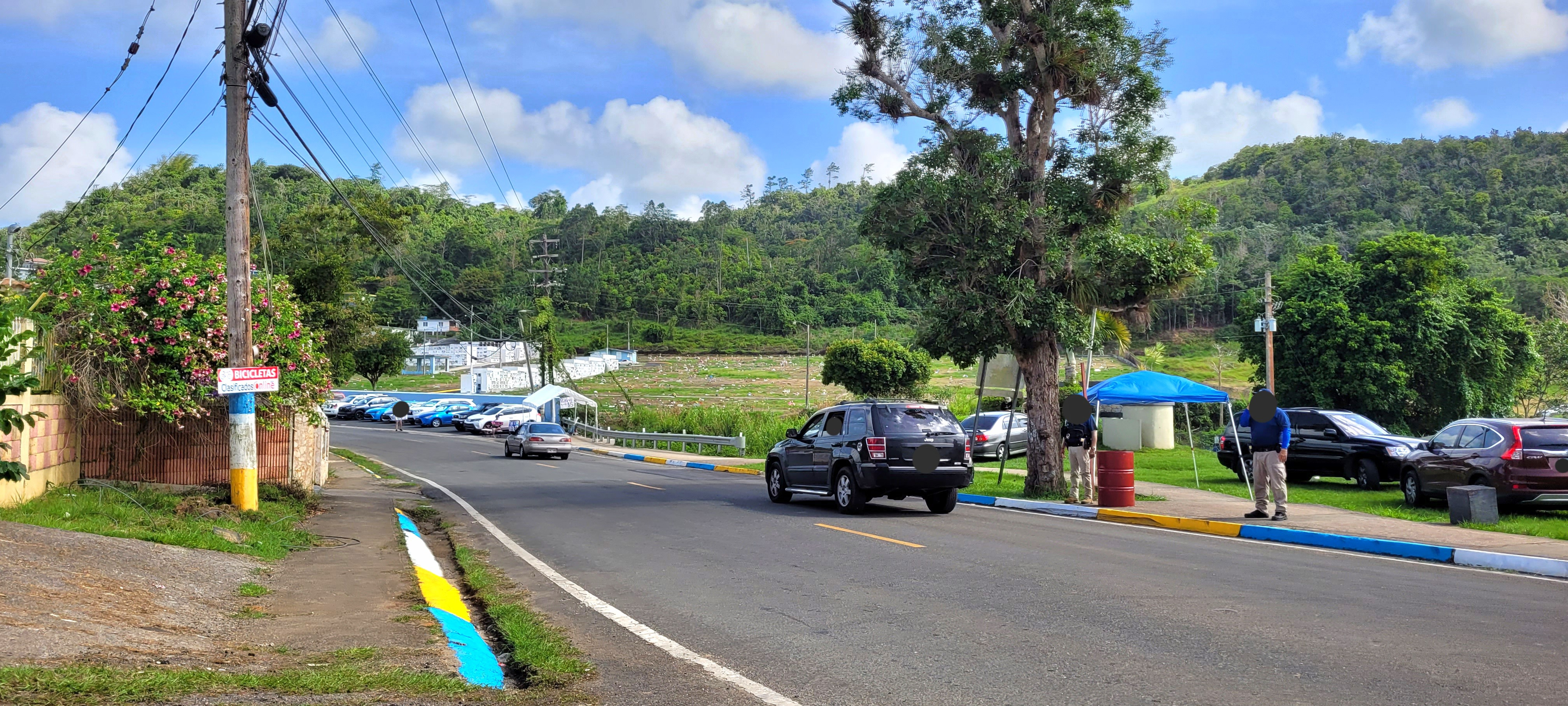
Puerto Rico Highway 722 in Robles

== See also ==
- List of communities in Puerto Rico
- List of barrios and sectors of Aibonito, Puerto Rico
