= Pedro Ávila, Cayey, Puerto Rico =

Barrio of Puerto Rico

Pedro Ávila
- Barrio
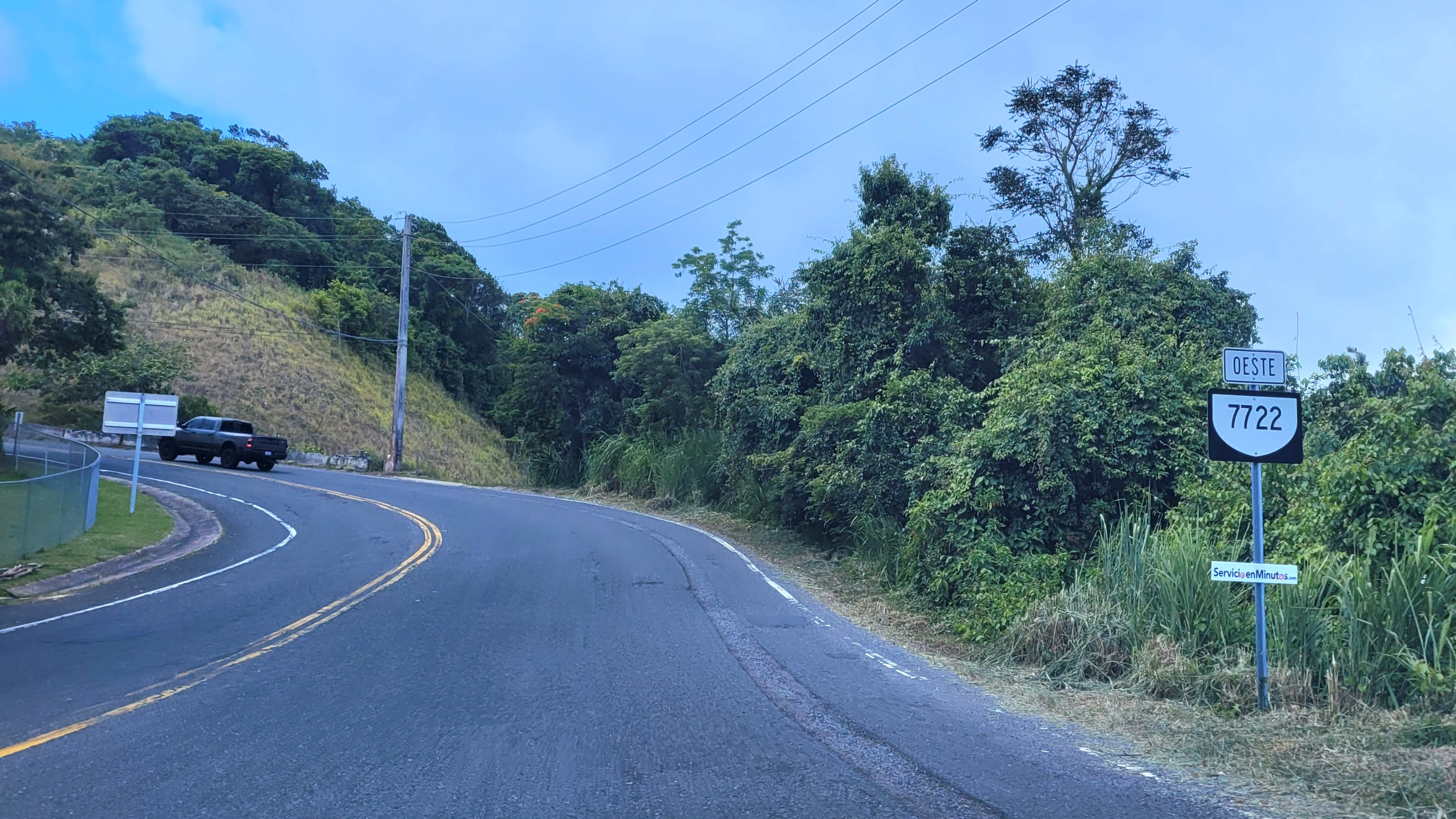
- Puerto Rico Highway 7722 between Pedro Ávila and Pasto Viejo

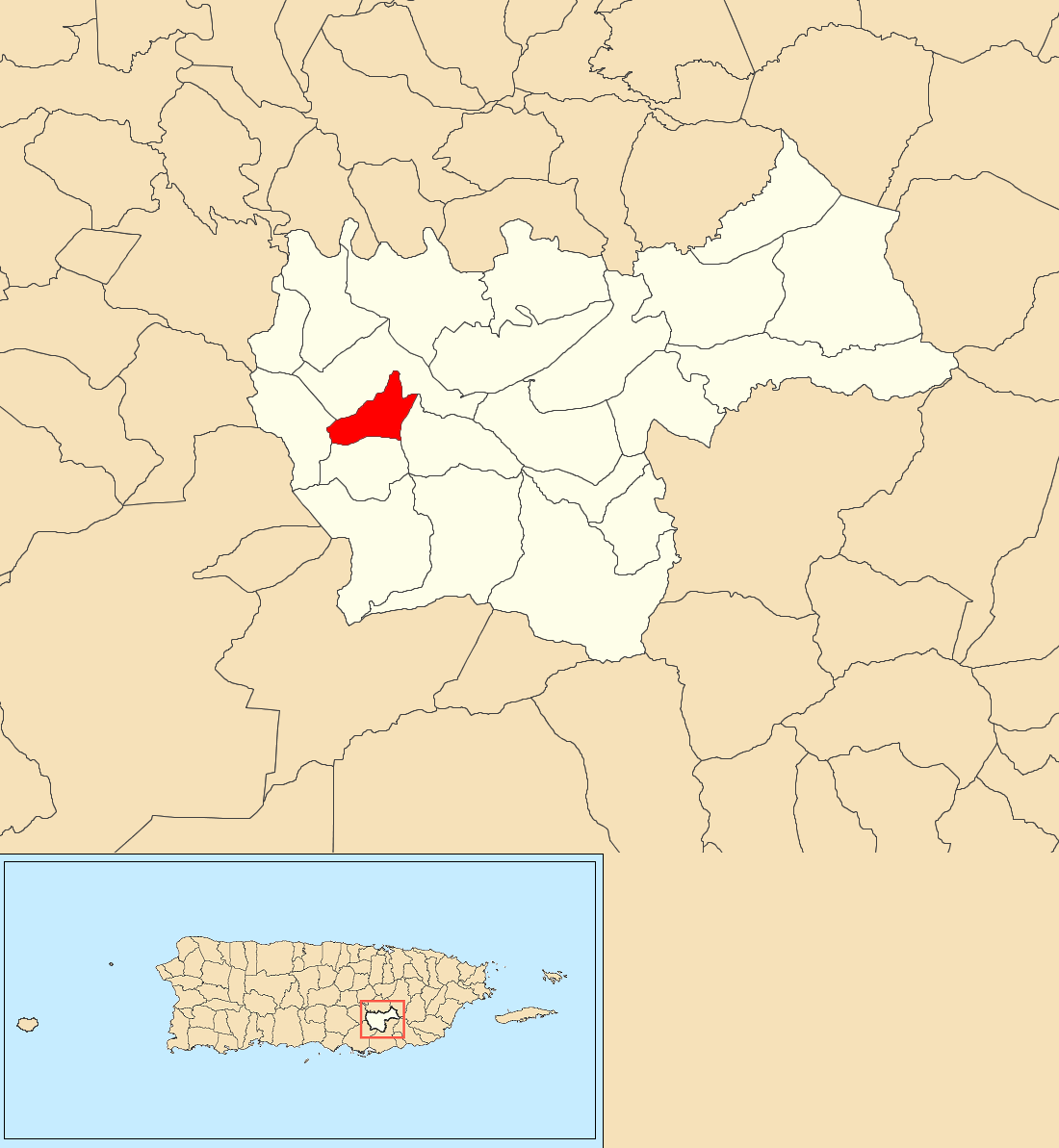
- Location of Pedro Ávila within the municipality of Cayey shown in red

- Location of Puerto Rico
- Coordinates: 18°05′53″N 66°11′43″W
- Commonwealth: Puerto Rico
- Municipality: Cayey

Area
  - Total: 0.81 sq mi (2.1 km^{2})
  - Land: 0.81 sq mi (2.1 km^{2})
  - Water: 0 sq mi (0 km^{2})
- Elevation: 1,821 ft (555 m)

Population (2010)
  - Total: 125
  - Density: 154.3/sq mi (59.6/km^{2})
- Source: 2010 Census
- Time zone: UTC−4 (AST)

Pedro Ávila is a barrio in the municipality of Cayey, Puerto Rico. Its population in 2010 was 125.

== History ==
Pedro Ávila was in Spain's gazetteers until Puerto Rico was ceded by Spain in the aftermath of the Spanish–American War under the terms of the Treaty of Paris of 1898 and became an unincorporated territory of the United States. In 1899, the United States Department of War conducted a census of Puerto Rico finding that the combined population of Pedro Ávila and Pasto Viejo barrios was 886.

Historical population
Census	Pop.	Note	%±
1910	514		—
1920	575		11.9%
1930	677		17.7%
1940	654		−3.4%
1950	267		−59.2%
1960	239		−10.5%
1970	340		42.3%
1980	261		−23.2%
1990	138		−47.1%
2000	178		29.0%
2010	125		−29.8%
U.S. Decennial Census; 1900 (N/A) 1910-1930; 1930-1950 1980-2000 2010

== See also ==
- List of communities in Puerto Rico
