= Pasto, Aibonito, Puerto Rico =

Barrio of Puerto Rico

Pasto
- Barrio
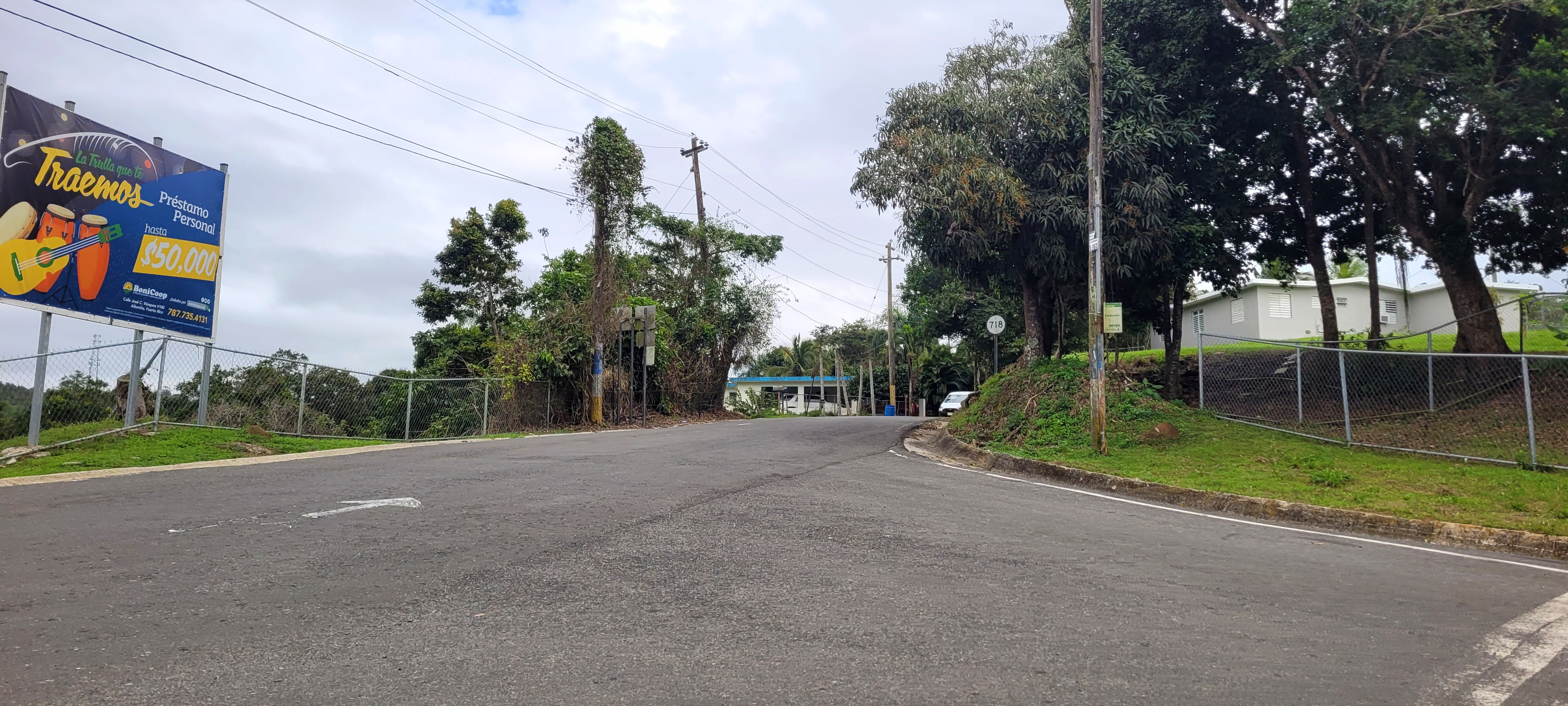
- Puerto Rico Highway 718 in Pasto

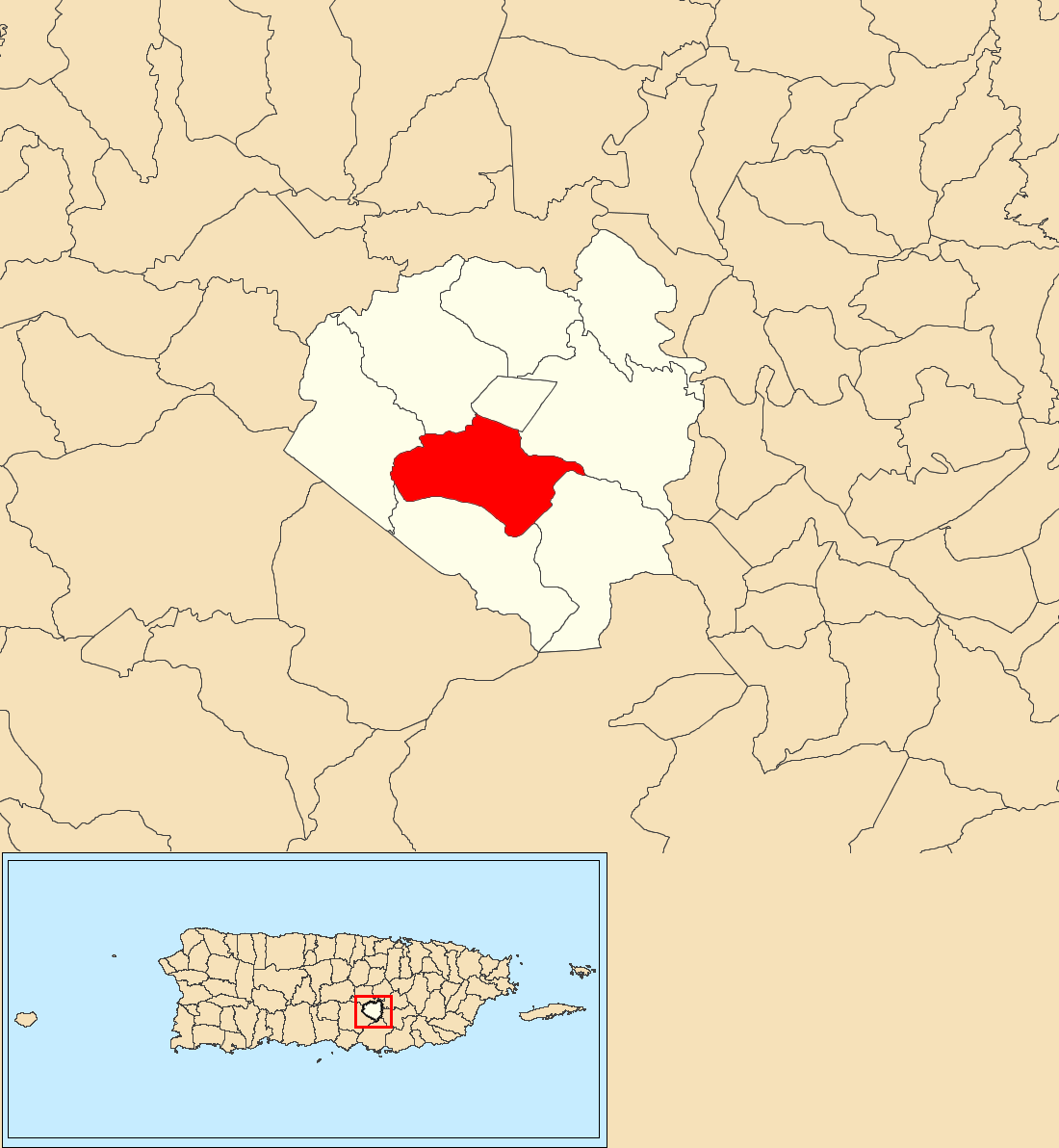
- Location of Pasto within the municipality of Aibonito shown in red

- Location of Puerto Rico
- Coordinates: 18°07′23″N 66°16′11″W
- Commonwealth: Puerto Rico
- Municipality: Aibonito

Area
  - Total: 3.29 sq mi (8.5 km^{2})
  - Land: 3.29 sq mi (8.5 km^{2})
  - Water: 0.00 sq mi (0 km^{2})
- Elevation: 2,041 ft (622 m)

Population (2010)
  - Total: 4,184
  - Density: 1,271.7/sq mi (491.0/km^{2})
- Source: 2010 Census
- Time zone: UTC−4 (AST)

Pasto is a barrio in the municipality of Aibonito, Puerto Rico. Its population in 2010 was 4,184.

== History ==
Pasto was in Spain's gazetteers until Puerto Rico was ceded by Spain in the aftermath of the Spanish–American War under the terms of the Treaty of Paris of 1898 and became an unincorporated territory of the United States. In 1899, the United States Department of War conducted a census of Puerto Rico finding that the combined population of Pasto and Robles barrios was 1,459.

Historical population
Census	Pop.	Note	%±
1910	776		—
1920	1,306		68.3%
1930	1,915		46.6%
1940	2,063		7.7%
1950	1,198		−41.9%
1960	2,371		97.9%
1970	2,988		26.0%
1980	3,625		21.3%
1990	3,814		5.2%
2000	3,988		4.6%
2010	4,184		4.9%
U.S. Decennial Census; 1900 (N/A) 1910-1930; 1930-1950 1980-2000 2010

== Sectors ==
Barrios (which are, in contemporary times, roughly comparable to minor civil divisions) in turn are further subdivided into smaller local populated place areas/units called sectores (sectors in English). The types of sectores may vary, from normally sector to urbanización to reparto to barriada to residencial, among others.

The following sectors are in Pasto barrio:

Carretera 162, Carretera 718, Comunidad Monte Verde, Comunidad Yura, Hacienda Camila, Parcelas Nuevas, Parcelas Viejas, Sector Bejuco, Sector Cuchilla, Sector Cuesta Blanca, Sector La Playita, Sector La Torre, Sector Los Cardín, Sector Palomas, Sector Pasto, Urbanización Las Delicias, Urbanización Paseo de Algarrobo, Urbanización Paseo de la Reina, and Villas de Algarrobo.

== Special communities ==
Since 2001 when law 1-2001 was passed, measures have been taken to identify and address the high levels of poverty and the lack of resources and opportunities affecting specific communities in Puerto Rico. Initially there were 686 places that made the list. By 2008, there were 742 places on the list of Comunidades especiales de Puerto Rico. The places on the list are barrios, communities, sectors, or neighborhoods and in 2004 several areas of Pasto barrio had made the list including: Parcelas Nuevas in Pasto, and Parcelas Viejas in Pasto. In 2017, Jesus Velez Vargas, the director of the Special Communities of Puerto Rico program stated that the program was evolving with more ways to help the residents of these so-called marginal communities.

== Gallery ==
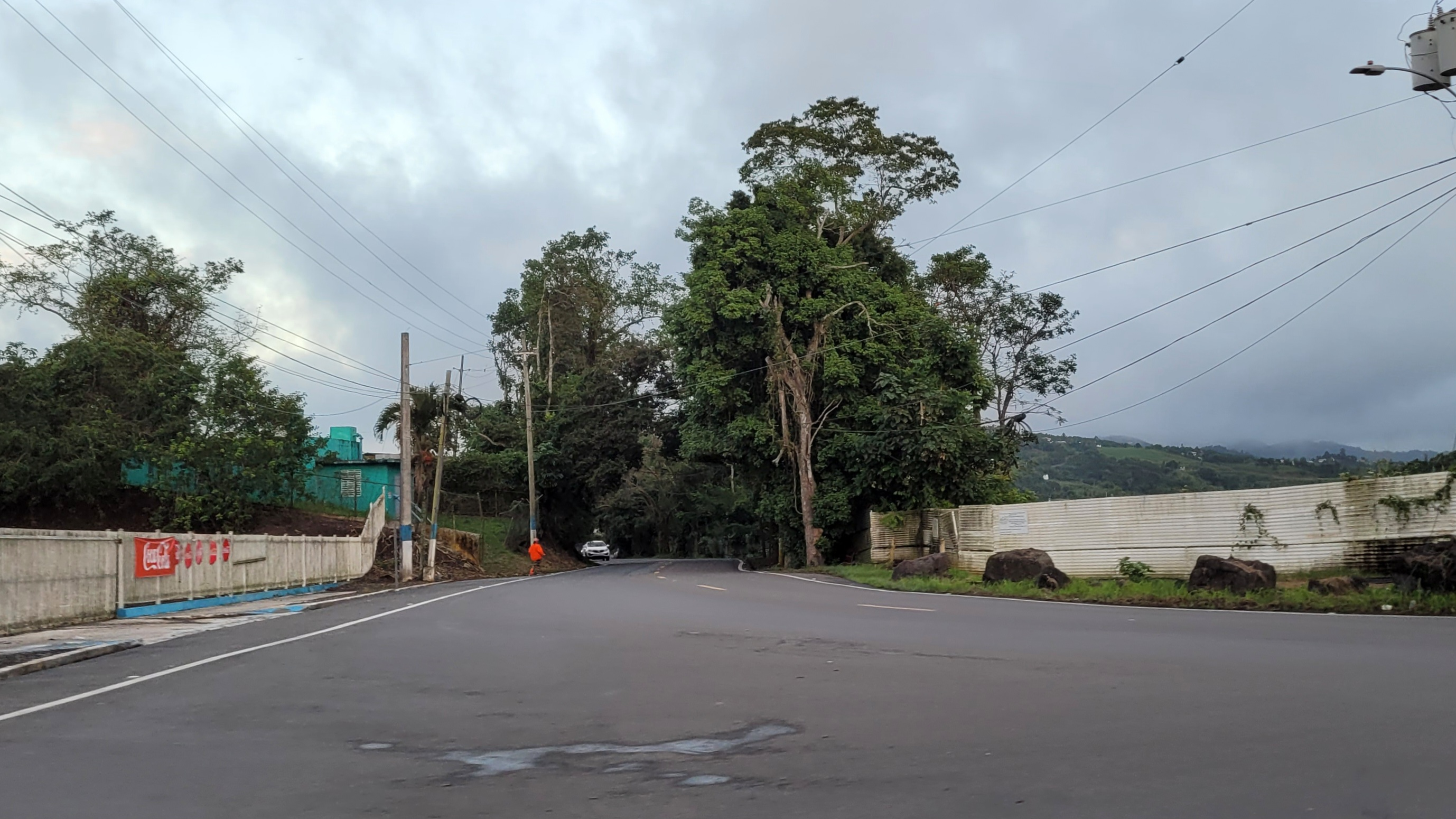
Puerto Rico Highway 14 between Pasto and Llanos

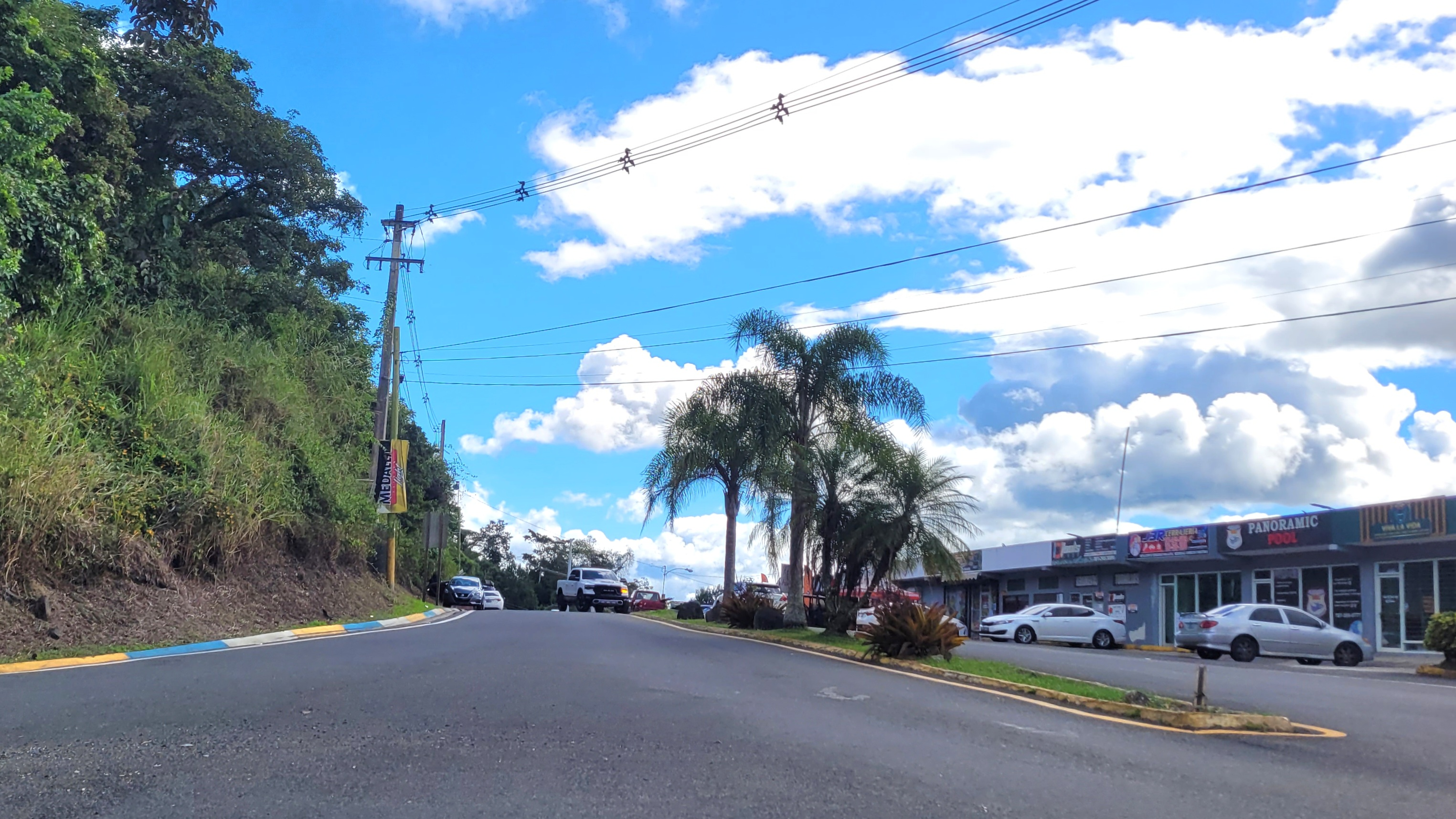
Puerto Rico Highway 7718 in Pasto

== See also ==
- List of communities in Puerto Rico
- List of barrios and sectors of Aibonito, Puerto Rico
