= Pasto Viejo, Cayey, Puerto Rico =

Barrio of Cayey, Puerto Rico

Pasto Viejo
- Barrio
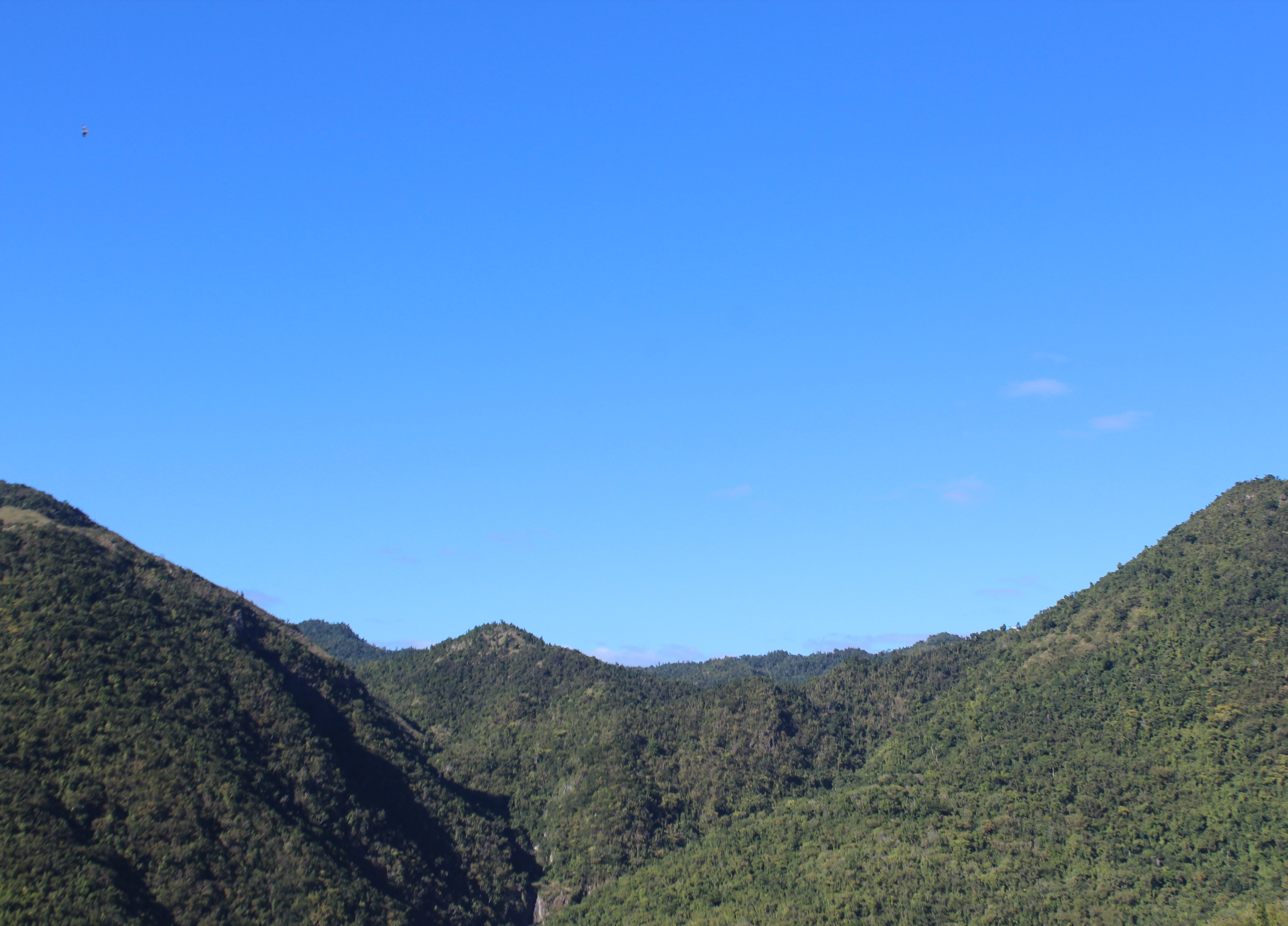
- La Yeyesa in Pasto Viejo

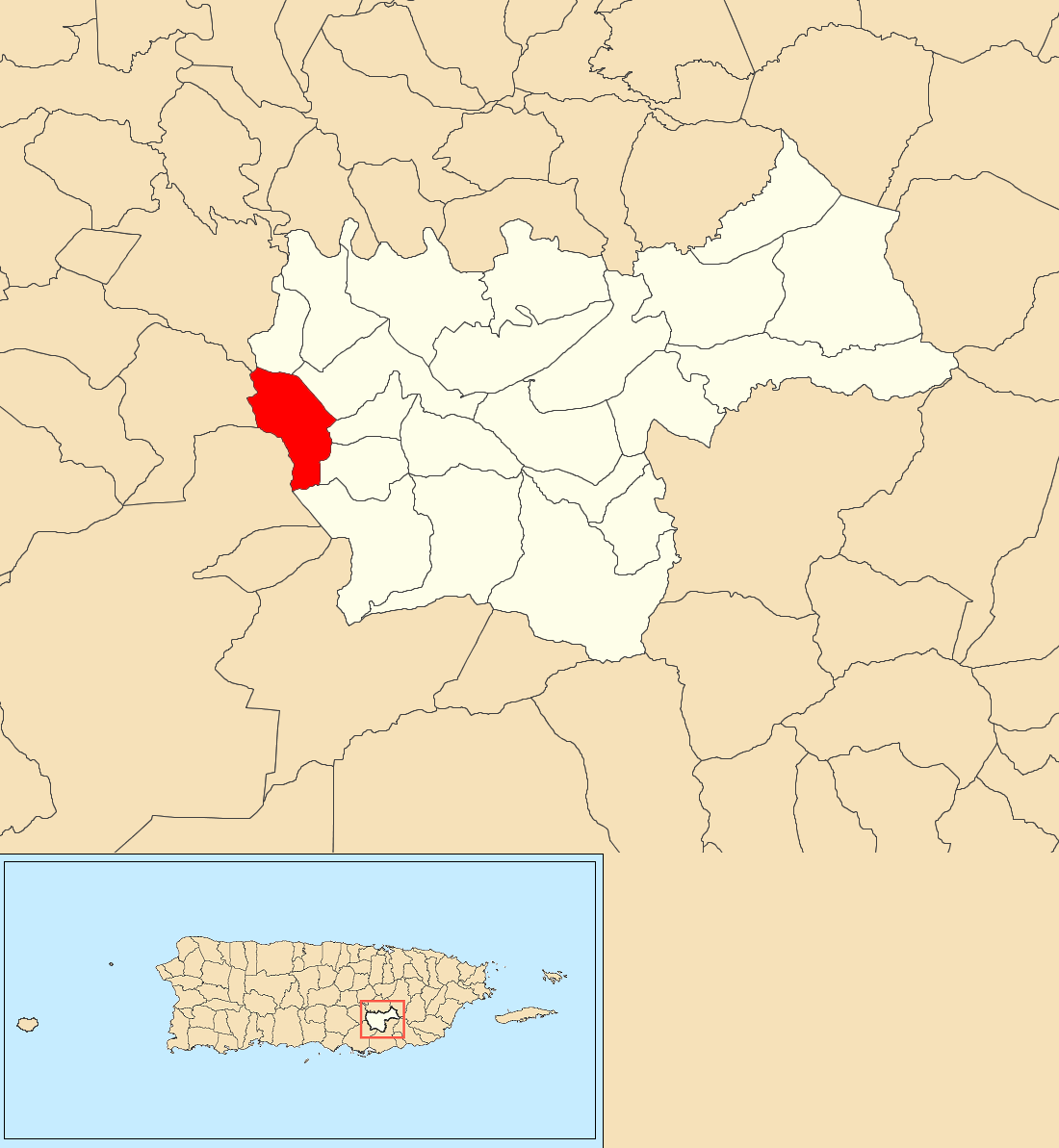
- Location of Pasto Viejo within the municipality of Cayey shown in red

- Location of Puerto Rico
- Coordinates: 18°05′47″N 66°12′56″W
- Commonwealth: Puerto Rico
- Municipality: Cayey

Area
  - Total: 1.61 sq mi (4.2 km^{2})
  - Land: 1.61 sq mi (4.2 km^{2})
  - Water: 0 sq mi (0 km^{2})
- Elevation: 1,909 ft (582 m)

Population (2010)
  - Total: 555
  - Density: 344.7/sq mi (133.1/km^{2})
- Source: 2010 Census
- Time zone: UTC−4 (AST)

Pasto Viejo is a barrio in the municipality of Cayey, Puerto Rico. Its population in 2010 was 555.

== History ==
Pasto Viejo was in Spain's gazetteers until Puerto Rico was ceded by Spain in the aftermath of the Spanish–American War under the terms of the Treaty of Paris of 1898 and became an unincorporated territory of the United States. In 1899, the United States Department of War conducted a census of Puerto Rico finding that the combined population of Pasto Viejo and Pedro Ávila barrios was 886.

Historical population
Census	Pop.	Note	%±
1910	445		—
1920	523		17.5%
1930	642		22.8%
1940	662		3.1%
1950	615		−7.1%
1960	557		−9.4%
1970	522		−6.3%
1980	526		0.8%
1990	642		22.1%
2000	654		1.9%
2010	555		−15.1%
U.S. Decennial Census; 1900 (N/A) 1910-1930; 1930-1950 1980-2000 2010

== See also ==
- List of communities in Puerto Rico
